= Hkonmaing I of Onbaung–Hsipaw =

Hkonmaing I of Onbaung–Hsipaw ခုံမှိုင်း ၶုၼ်မိူင်း

Saopha of Onbaung–Hsipaw
- Reign: 1500s – 1542
- Successor: Hkonmaing II
- Born: c. 1480; Hsipaw (Thibaw)
- Died: c. May 1542; Hsipaw?
- Issue: Hkonmaing II
- House: Hsipaw
- Religion: Theravada Buddhism

Hkonmaing (Burmese: ခုံမှိုင်း [kʰòʊɴ m̥áɪɴ], Shan: ၶုၼ်မိူင်း; also Hkonmaing Gyi, Hkun Möng Gyi) or Hso Tamla was saopha of the Shan principality of Onbaung–Hsipaw in what is now Myanmar. He was the only main ally of King Narapati II of Ava in the latter's 25-year struggle against the Mohnyin-led Confederation of Shan States, Prome and Toungoo. After Ava's fall, he became a member of the Confederation. He died during or shortly after his participation in the Confederation's 1542 campaign against Toungoo Dynasty. His son, also named Hkonmaing, and grandson Narapati III became kings of Ava.

== Background ==
What is known about Hkonmaing is solely from the Burmese chronicles. The Chinese annals (Ming Shilu) on the Tai-Shan frontier (present-day southern Yunnan, Kachin State and Shan State) stopped at Hsenwi, and make no mention of Hsipaw. The Burmese chronicles mention Hkonmaing as a supporting figure—albeit an important one—in King Narapati II's reign. According to the chronicles, Hkonmaing (also called Hkonmaing Gyi, lit. "Hkonmaing the elder") was the ruler of the Shan state of Onbaung–Hsipaw, certainly by 1505. Since his eldest son Hkonmaing the younger was born in 1497, he was likely born c. 1480.

At the time, Onbaung–Hsipaw was a major Shan state, which controlled (or claimed to control) the entire stretch of eastern Shan Hills west of the Salween River: Bhamo, Yawnghwe (Nyaungshwe), Mong Nai (Mone) and Mong Pai (Mobye). (Note: Onbaung–Hsipaw's claims especially that over Mong Nai/Mone need to be tempered. It was more likely that members of a ruling clan governed these states than an outright patron-client relationship. Mong Nai was a major Shan state in its own right; its ruling clan was related to the ruling dynasty of Lan Na as well as Onbaung–Hsipaw. Per (Maha Yazawin Vol. 2 2006: 240), the Mong Nai leadership claimed a say in Hsipaw's succession order as much as Hsipaw claimed Mong Nai, and in 1557 they attacked Hsipaw because they disagreed with Bayinnaung's choice of the saopha of Hsipaw.) Moreover, Onbaung–Hsipaw's relationship with Ava in the early 16th century was closer to an alliance than a patron-client arrangement. Chronicles mention Hkonmaing and Narapati II as thwethauk brothers—men who have ritually entered into "a sacramental brotherhood" by drinking each other's blood. (Note: (Harvey 1925: 178): thwethauk means "a sacramental brotherhood of some round table as it were".) Ava had been disintegrating since the 1480s, and its rulers had been fighting losing wars on several fronts against its former vassal states. Narapati II, who came to power in 1501 amidst major rebellions, desperately tried to retain the loyalty of remaining "vassal" rulers like Hkonmaing of Onbaung and Mingyi Nyo of Toungoo.

== Ally of Ava ==
In the end, Hkonmaing was the only steadfast ally of Narapati II. In late 1505, he sent an army (4,000 men, 300 horses, 60 elephants) led by his younger brother to assist Narapati defend the town of Sale from the forces of Prome and Toungoo. Hkonmaing likely stayed in the alliance because he and Narapati were fighting against a common enemy: Sawlon the ambitious expansionist leader of Mohnyin. Sawlon had been raiding Ava's northern territory since 1502. In 1511, Hkonmaing lost Bhamo, its northernmost possession, to Sawlon whose army simply seized the border town between the two Shan states. Hkonmaing asked Narapati for help. Narapati sent a sizable army (12,000 men, 600 horses, 150 elephants). But the Ava army was ambushed en route at Myedu by a smaller Mohnyin force (4,000 men, 200 horses, 100 elephants), and was driven back with heavy losses.

Hkonmaing remained in the alliance even as Mohnyin grew more powerful in the following years. When Sawlon and his allies attacked Ava itself in 1524, Hkonmaing personally led an army (8,000 men, 600 horses, 100 elephants) and defended Ava. But the combined Mohnyin and Prome forces drove out Narapati II and Hkonaming on 22 March 1525. The two thwethauk brothers still had sizable armies—the defeated Ava army still had 8,000 men, 400 horses, 250 elephants while the Onbaung army counted 7,000 men, 500 horses, 80 elephants. As the two armies moved south and entered Toungoo's territory, they were met by the Toungoo army (4,000 men, 400 horses, 100 elephants) at Yamethin. They defeated the Toungoo army, and followed up to Toungoo itself. They could not take it and had to retreat to Ava. (Mohnyin and Prome forces had looted and left the city.) According to the chronicles, Narapati was truly grateful that Hkonmaing remained loyal till the end, and is said to give the saopha many jewels. But Hkonmaing is said to have refused the presents.

But their troubles were not yet over. Sawlon returned in the dry season of 1526–27 with a 15,000-strong army. Hkonmaing again came to the aid of Narapati II, and defended Ava. Like in 1525, Sawlon's forces overwhelmed Ava's defenses. On 25 March 1527, Narapati II died in action, and Ava was taken. Sawlon appointed his eldest son Thohanbwa king of Ava.

== Later years ==
After the defeat at Ava, Hkonmaing retreated to Hsipaw. He later either agreed to a truce with, or submitted to Sawlon since Sawlon did not attack Hsipaw after Ava's fall. After Sawlon was assassinated in 1533, Hkonmaing like other leaders of the Confederation probably did not acknowledge Thohanbwa as the first among equals. However, he did stay in the Confederation. He actively participated in the Confederation's 1541–42 campaign to retake Prome (Pyay).

The campaign was a failure. The Confederation forces were defeated in April 1542 by Toungoo forces led by Gen. Bayinnaung. Hkonmaing died during the campaign or shortly after since by May 1542, he was already dead. (Note: (Maha Yazawin Vol. 2 2006: 120): He was already dead in Kason 904 ME (15 April 1542 to 14 May 1542) when the Ava court offered the throne to his son, Hkonmaing the younger.)

== Bibliography ==
- Aung Tun, Sai (2009). History of the Shan State: From Its Origins to 1962. Chiang Mai: Silk Worm Books. ISBN 978-974-9511-43-5.
- Fernquest, Jon (Autumn 2005). "Min-gyi-nyo, the Shan Invasions of Ava (1524–27), and the Beginnings of Expansionary Warfare in Toungoo Burma: 1486–1539" (PDF). SOAS Bulletin of Burma Research. 3 (2). Archived from the original (PDF) on 2016-03-03.
- Harvey, G. E. (1925). History of Burma: From the Earliest Times to 10 March 1824. London: Frank Cass & Co. Ltd.
- Kala, U (1724). Maha Yazawin (in Burmese). Vol. 1–3 (2006, 4th printing ed.). Yangon: Ya-Pyei Publishing.

Hkonmaing I of Onbaung–Hsipaw House of Onbaung–Hsipaw Born: c. 1480 Died: c. May 1542
Royal titles
Preceded by	Saopha of Onbaung–Hsipaw in or before 1505 – 1542	Succeeded by Hkonmaing II
