= Möng Yang =

Former Shan state in Burma

Coordinates: 27°47′N 96°22′E

- State of the Shan States
- c. 13th century–18th century
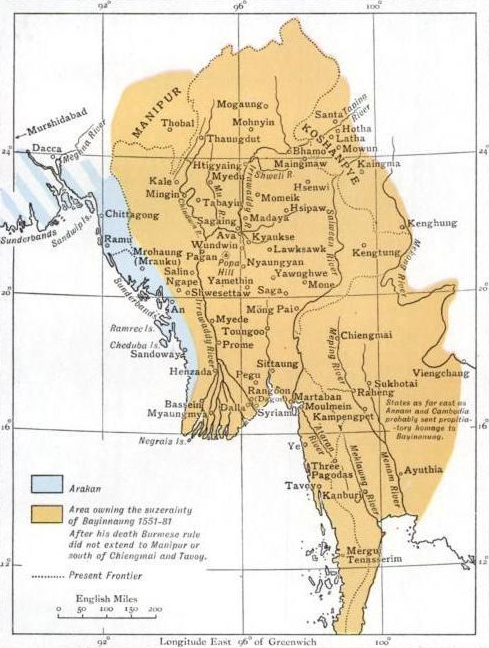
- Möng Yang (Mohnyin) in a map of the Toungoo Kingdom
- Capital: Möng Yang (Mohnyin)
- History
  - Established: c. 13th century
  - Subjugated by King Bayinnaung: 1557
  - Annexed by the Kingdom of Burma: 18th century
Succeeded by
Konbaung dynasty
- Today part of: Mohnyin District, Myanmar

Möng Yang (Shan: မိူင်းယၢင်း; Tai Nüa: ᥛᥫᥒᥰ ᥕᥣᥒᥰ; Burmese: မိုးညှင်း; Chinese: 孟养), also known as Mohnyin, was a Shan state in what is today Myanmar (Burma). It was centered around the modern town of Mohnyin in present-day Kachin State, outside of the modern Shan State.

== History ==
In Chinese records, Möng Yang first emerges in 1295 as Yunyuan (雲遠), when a Tribal Command was set up in the area by the Yuan dynasty. From the 1370s to 1390s, Burmese and Chinese records indicate that the state, then under the control of Möng Mao, made several incursions into the Kingdom of Ava and the Shan state of Kale (centered around the modern-day town of Kalay). In 1399, Möng Yang became independent from Möng Mao, and in 1402 it was regarded as a prefecture, then in 1404 as a pacification commission, by the Ming dynasty. From 1406, Ava also gained a degree of control over Möng Yang and appointed a Burmese prince, Mohnyin Thado, to rule the area. Burmese inscriptions and chronicles suggest or claim that Möng Yang was under Ava's control until the 1470s, though this control was likely only intermittent and nominal.

From the 1470s onward, Möng Yang entered a period of expansion at the expense of its neighbours, making incursions into the Ava kingdom, the Kabaw Valley, Bhamo, Kale, and possibly even making attempts to invade parts of Assam.

From 1524, the ruler of Möng Yang, Sawlon, invaded the Kingdom of Ava and succeeded in the conquest of the kingdom, placing his son Thohanbwa on the Avan throne in 1527.

During this Shan rule over Ava, the Burmese chronicles refer to the existence of a confederation of Shan states. Historical sources are not clear about when or how this alliance or confederation arose, but by 1543 the Burmese chronicle indicates the cooperation between the states of Möng Yang, Möng Mit, Bhamo, Hsipaw, Möng Nai, Yawnghwe, and Kale (modern Kalay).

In 1532, Sawlon marched on his erstwhile ally, the Prome Kingdom, feeling that Prome had not provided sufficient support in their war against Ava. On his journey back to Möng Yang, a dispute between two factions arose in the Shan ruling elite, and Sawlon was assassinated by his own ministers.

The Shans neglected to intervene in the first four years of Toungoo–Hanthawaddy War (1535–1541) in Lower Burma. The saophas sent a force to relieve Prome from a new invasion only in 1539, and were ultimately unable to hold Prome against another Toungoo attack in 1542.

In 1543, the Burmese ministers assassinated Thohanbwa and placed Hkonmaing, the saopha of Hsipaw, on the Ava throne. Möng Yang leaders, led by Sithu Kyawhtin, had to grudgingly agree to Hkonmaing's leadership in light of the Toungoo threat. The confederation's bickering resumed in full force after failed invasions leading to Toungoo forces taking Bagan in 1544 and Hkonmaing's death in 1546. Sithu Kyawhtin set up a rival fiefdom in Sagaing across the river from Ava and finally drove out Mobye Narapati in 1552.

The weakened confederation proved no match for Bayinnaung's Toungoo forces. Bayinnaung captured Ava in 1555 and conquered all of the Shan States in a series of military campaigns from 1556 to 1557. A record of the conquest of Möng Yang in 1557 is mentioned in a bell inscription relating the conquests of King Bayinnaung.

Beginning with its subjugation by King Bayinnaung, the state was gradually integrated into the central Burmese administration, though still retaining its own native dynasty. Eventually, during the reign of Alaungpaya or possibly even as late as the end of the 18th century, native rule by Shan sawbwas in Möng Yang was permanently abolished in favour of centrally appointed Burmese governors.

== Rulers ==
=== Saophas ===
#	Rulers	Begin	End	Details
1	Hkun Hpa	605	642	2nd son of Hkun Lu
2	Hkun Hkam Ton Wun	642	658	Son of Hkun Hpa
3	Hso Waing Hpa	658	680	Son of Hkun Hkam Ton Wun
4	Hso Parn Möng	680	703	Son of Hso Waing Hpa
5	Hso Hkong Hkam	703	733	Son of Hso Parn Möng
6	Hso Yawt Hpa	733	750	Son of Hso Hkong Hkam
7	Hseng Hkam Hpa	750	780	Son of Hso Yawt Hpa
8	Hseng Yawk Hpa	780	803	Son of Hseng Hkam Hpa
9	Ai Sang Hkwan Hpa	803	846	Son of Hseng Yawk Hpa
10	Ai Mo Sang Hkam	846	889	Son of Ai Sang Hkwan Hpa
11	Kang Kyaung Hpa	889	904	Son of Ai Mo Sang Hkam
12	Ai Hseng Kam Kyai	904	940	Son of Kang Kyaung Hpa
13	Hso Kyan Hpa	940	964	Son of Ai Hseng Kam Kyai
14	Hso Yap Hpa	964	1001	Son of Hso Kyan Hpa
15	Hso Yawk Hpa	1001	1016	Son of Hso Yap Hpa
16	Hso Young Hpa	1016	1036	Son of Hso Yawk Hpa
17	Hso Srang Hpa	1036	1045	Younger Brother of Hso Young Hpa
18	Hso Ngam Hpa	1045	1066	Nephew of Hso Srang Hpa younger bro
19	Hso Ngom Hpa	1066	1084	Son of Srang
20	Hso Hom Hpa	1084	1112	Son of Ngam
21	Hso Hon Hpa	1112	1133	Son of Hom
22	Hso Gam Hpa	1133	1150	Son of Hom
23	Hso Pong Hpa	1150	1175	Son of Hso Gam Hpa son of
24	Hso Dang Hpa - (Ai Moe Kang Hkam)	1175	1199	Son of Hso Pong Hpa
25	Hso Haw Hpa	1199	1234	Son of Hso Dang Hpa
26	Hso Hing Hpa	1234	1246	Son of Hso Haw Hpa
27	Hso Kyaw Hpa	1246	1268	Son of Hso Hing Hpa
28	Hso Poi Hpa	1268	1290	Son of Hso Kyaw Hpa
29	Hso Kawn Hpa	1290	1311	Son of Hso Poi Hpa
30	Hso Aown Hpa	1311	1333	Son of Hso Kawn Hpa
31	Sam Long Hpa - (ᥔᥣᥛᥴ ᥘᥨᥒᥴ [Huan Sam Hnaung], ᥓᥝᥲ ᥔᥣᥛᥴ ᥖᥣ [Sao Sam Ta])	1333	1350	
32	Hso Han Hpa	1350	1358	Son of Kyan Long Hpa
33	Sao Hkun Law	1358	1368	
34	Sao Pu Rieng	1368	1372	
35	Sao Dyert Hpa	1372	1381	
36	Sao Aung Myat	1381	1384	
37	Hkun Dern Hpa	1384	1393	
38	Sao Hong Hpa	1393	1404	
39	Sao Ping Hpa	1404	1414	
40	Hso Kyaung Hpa	1414	1430	Son of Sao Ping Hpa
41	Hso Ngan Hpa	1430	1442	Son of Hso Kyaung Hpa
42	Hso Chi Hpa - (ᥔᥫᥴ ᥐᥤ ᥜᥣᥳ)	1442	1449	Son of Hso Ngan Hpa. Died 1454
43	Hso Lui Hpa — 1st time	1449	1451	Son of Hso Chi Hpa
44	Hso Bou Hpa	1451	1461	
45	Hso Hong Hpa - (ᥔᥫᥴ ᥞᥨᥛᥲ ᥜᥣᥳ)	1461	1480	
—	—	1480	1486	No details
43	Hso Lui Hpa — 2nd time	1486	1519	Son of Hso Chi Hpa
46	Sawlon I (Hso Long Hpa, also Hso Kyeng Hpa, Hso Lun Hpa, Hso Yiam Hpa)	1519	1533	Son of Hso Lui Hpa. Born 2 April 1486
47	Sao Sui Kiao	1533	1547	Son of Hso Long Hpa
48	Hso Hkuan Hpa	1547	1564	Younger brother of Sao Sui Kiao
49	Hso Hkoe Hpa	1564	1580	Son of Hso Sui Kiao
50	Hso Wei Hpa - (Hso Yi Hpa, Hso Kyoen Hpa)	1580	1586	Son of Hso Khuan Hpa
51	Hso Yoen Hpa	1586	1591	Son of Hso Hkoe Hpa
52	Hso Hueng Hpa	1591	1604	Son of Hso Yoen Hpa
53	Hso Kwang Hpa	1604	1636	Son of Hso Hueng Hpa
—	Nang Chu Paw	1636	1652	Mahadewi of Hso Kwang Hpa. Regent instead her son was too young
54	Sao Yawt Chai	1652	1674	Son of Hso Kwang Hpa
55	Hso Hkowt Hpa	1674	1697	Son of Sao Yawt Chai
56	Hso Soet Hpa	1697	1713	Son of Hso Hkowt Hpa
57	Hso Suek Hpa	1713	1726	Son of Hso Soet Hpa
58	Thao Möng Han	1726	1738	Son of Hso Suek Hpa
59	Thao Yawt Hkam	1738	1753	Son of Thao Möng Han
60	Hkun Kyaw Hpa	1753	1773	Son of Thao Yawt Hkam
61	Sai Hkam Paw Maing	1773	1793	Son of Hkun Kyaw Hpa
62	Ai Hso Hi Hkaing	1793	1805	Son of Sai Hkam Paw Maing
63	Thao Oob Sai Hkaw	1805	1816	Son of Ai Hso Hi Hkaing
64	Thao Ka Le	1816	1845	Son of Thao Oob Sai Hkaw
65	Thao Yawt Sai Hkaw	1845	1876	Son of Thao Ka Le
66	Sao Yawt Sang Poi	1876	1924	Son of Thao Yawt Sai Hkaw
67	Thao Hlaing Gan Chai	1924	1934	Younger brother of Sao Yawt Sang Poi
68	Sao Hpo Rieng	1934	1940	Son of Thao Hlaing Gan Chai. Killed by Japanese troop.
69	Ai Hseng Khaing Möng	1940	1946	Younger brother of Sao Hpo Rieng. Take the poison and death. The Last Saopha.

=== Myowuns ===
Under the Konbaung dynasty the area of the former state was administered by a Viceroy called a Myowun, who was appointed by the king and possessed civil, judicial, fiscal and military powers.

- 1853–18?? Nemyo Minhtin Themanta Yaza (Six Myowuns – Mohnyin, Kawng Ton, Shwegu, Moe Ta, Yin khia, Kat Hsa)
