= Toungoo–Ava War =

16th-century military conflict in Asia

Toungoo–Ava War (1538–1545)
- Part of Wars of the First Toungoo Empire
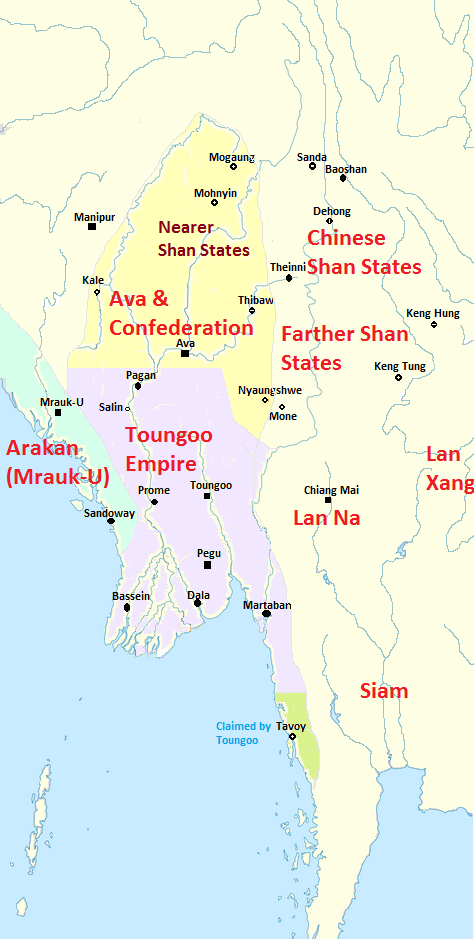
- Toungoo Empire after the war
Date	c. November 1538 – c. January 1545
Location	Prome, Salin, Irrawaddy delta
Result	Toungoo victory: Treaty of Pegu (1545)
Territorial changes	Toungoo gains Central Burma up to Pagan (Bagan)

Belligerents
Toungoo Kingdom; Portuguese contingent	Ava Kingdom; Confederation of Shan States; Hanthawaddy (1538–39); Prome (1538–42); Arakan (1538–42)

Commanders and leaders
Tabinshwehti; Bayinnaung; Saw Lagun Ein; Smim Payu; Thiri Zeya Kyawhtin; Nanda Yawda; Smim Bya Thamaik; Sithu Kyawhtin II of Salin; Nanda Thingyan	Thohanbwa; Hkonmaing I; Hkonmaing II; Narapati III; Takayutpi; Narapati of Prome; Minkhaung of Prome; Min Bin of Mrauk-U; Min Dikkha; Min Aung Hla; Sithu Kyawhtin I of Salin; Sawlon II of Mohnyin

Units involved
Royal Toungoo Army; Royal Toungoo Navy	Royal Avan Army; CSS Army and Navy (1538–45); Prome Army (1538–42); Arakanese Army and Navy (1541–42)

Strength
1538–39: 7,000+ 1541–42: 17,000; 1543–44: 21,000; 1544–45: 7,000+	1538–1539: 5,000 (CSS); unknown (Prome); unknown (Pegu); 1541–42: unknown (Prome); 16,000 (CSS); 12,000 (Arakan); 1543–44: 28,000 (CSS); 1544–45: 3,000

Casualties and losses
Unknown (high)	Unknown (high)

The Toungoo–Ava War (1538–1545) (Burmese: တောင်ငူ–အင်းဝ စစ် (၁၅၃၈–၁၅၄၅)) was a military conflict that took place in present-day Lower and Central Burma (Myanmar) between the Toungoo Dynasty, and the Ava-led Confederation of Shan States, Hanthawaddy Pegu, and Arakan (Mrauk-U). Toungoo's decisive victory gave the upstart kingdom control of all of central Burma, and cemented its emergence as the largest polity in Burma since the fall of Pagan Empire in 1287.

The war began in 1538 when Ava, through its vassal Prome, threw its support behind Pegu in the four-year-old war between Toungoo and Pegu. After its troops broke the siege of Prome in 1539, Ava got its Confederation allies agreed to prepare for war, and formed an alliance with Arakan. But the loose alliance crucially failed to open a second front during the seven dry-season months of 1540–41 when Toungoo was struggling to conquer Martaban (Mottama).

The allies were initially unprepared when Toungoo forces renewed the war against Prome in November 1541. Due to poor coordination, the armies of the Ava-led Confederation and Arakan were driven back by better organized Toungoo forces in April 1542, after which the Arakanese navy, which had already taken two key Irrawaddy delta ports, retreated. Prome surrendered a month later. The war then entered an 18-month hiatus during which Arakan left the alliance, and Ava underwent a contentious leadership change. In December 1543, the largest army and naval forces of Ava and the Confederation came down to retake Prome. But Toungoo forces, which had now enlisted foreign mercenaries and firearms, not only drove back the numerically superior invasion force but also took over all of Central Burma up to Pagan (Bagan) by April 1544. In the following dry season, a small Ava army raided down to Salin but was destroyed by larger Toungoo forces.

The successive defeats brought the long simmering disagreements between Ava and Mohnyin of the Confederation to the forefront. Faced with a serious Mohnyin-backed rebellion, Ava in 1545 sought and agreed to a peace treaty with Toungoo in which Ava formally ceded all of Central Burma between Pagan and Prome. Ava would be beset by the rebellion for the next six years while an emboldened Toungoo would turn its attention to conquering Arakan in 1545–47, and Siam in 1547–49.

== Background ==
=== Early 16th century Upper Burma ===
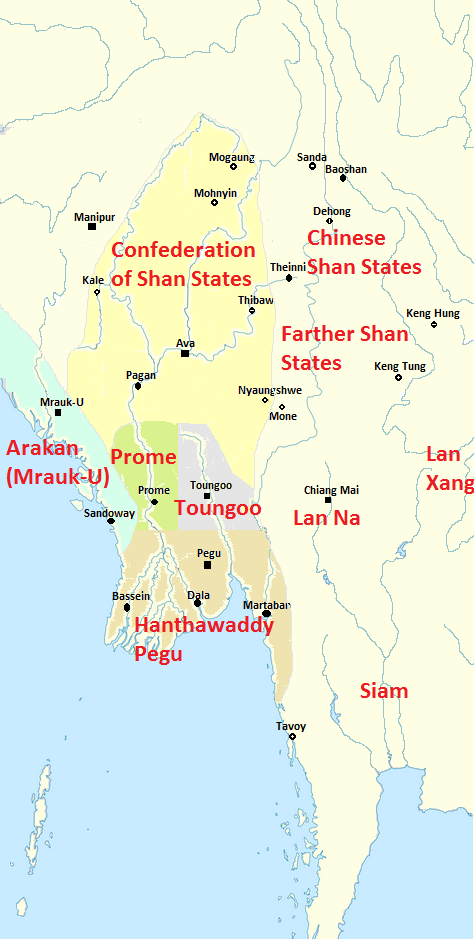
Political Map of Burma (Myanmar) in 1530

In the early 16th century, the present-day Myanmar (Burma) comprised several small kingdoms. The Ava Kingdom, the principal power in Upper Burma in the 14th and 15th centuries, had been fighting a long losing war against an alliance of its former vassal states: the Confederation of Shan States and Prome (Pyay). Another former vassal state Toungoo (Taungoo), hemmed in by the Bago Yoma range in the west and the Shan Hills in the east, stayed out of the internecine warfare raging in Upper Burma. As the only peaceful state in Upper Burma, Toungoo had received a steady stream of refugees.

Then, in 1527, the Confederation finally defeated Ava, and in 1532, its erstwhile ally Prome. Its paramount leader Sawlon I of Mohnyin had now reunited most of Upper Burma and cis-Salween Shan states for the first time since 1480. Toungoo, the only remaining holdout, was his "obvious next target." Fortunately for Toungoo, Sawlon I was assassinated in 1533 on his return trip from Prome, and his son and successor Thohanbwa, based out of Ava, was not accepted as the first among equals by other saophas (chiefs) of the Confederation. Without a strong leader, the Confederation suddenly ceased to be a unified force capable of combined action.

=== Toungoo's gambit ===
The Toungoo leadership nonetheless concluded that their kingdom "had to act quickly if it wished to avoid being swallowed up" by the Confederation. In 1534, Toungoo began raiding Pegu's territory to the south in a gambit to break out of its increasingly narrow realm. Although a united polity of Toungoo and Pegu could in theory challenge their possessions in western central Burma (the Prome to Pagan corridor along the Irrawaddy), the Confederation's fractured leadership took no action. They apparently did not believe that the tiny Toungoo could defeat the larger, wealthier Pegu; or that Pegu's weak leader Takayutpi, who was also facing an internal rebellion by Martaban (Mottama), could conquer either Toungoo or Martaban, much less pose a threat to Prome.

At first, their nonchalance proved justified: Toungoo's annual dry-season raids of Lower Burma (1534–37) all failed while Pegu could not organize a counterattack against either Toungoo or Martaban. Closer to the battleground, however, King Narapati of Prome was increasingly concerned by Toungoo's deeper and longer raids with each successive campaign, and raised the alarm with Ava. In 1538, Prome, presumably with Ava's permission, entered into an alliance with Takayutpi. Though he had now taken sides, Thohanbwa still did not see a compelling reason to commit his troops, or ask his Confederation allies for additional troops. Indeed, no Ava or Confederation troops were in Prome at the start of the 1538–39 dry season when Toungoo would change the course of history.

== First Toungoo siege of Prome (1538–39) ==
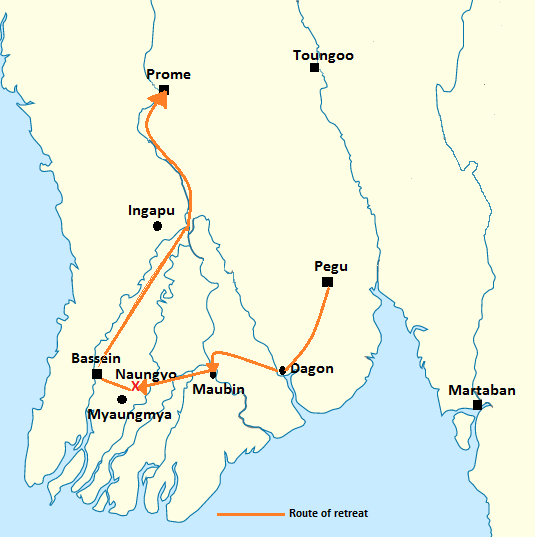
Battle of Naungyo (1538)

In late 1538, Toungoo again opened its annual dry season campaign. It would have been like any previous one except that in a series of improbable events, Toungoo went on to conquer Lower Burma (except Martaban) in a blitz. By using a stratagem, Toungoo armies took Pegu without firing a shot. A few weeks later, Hanthawaddy's larger but poorly led forces were decisively defeated at the Battle of Naungyo by light forces of Gen. Kyawhtin Nawrahta (Bayinnaung). Only a weakened Hanthawaddy force made it to Prome.

The rapid turn of events caught everyone by surprise. Narapati immediately asked Ava for help. While a flatfooted Thohanbwa scrambled to round up the troops, about 7000 Toungoo land and naval forces (Note: At the start of the chase of Takayutpi, the combined strength of Toungoo's army and navy was 8000 (4500 army, 3500 navy) per (Hmannan Vol. 2 2003: 190–191). But they must have lost a portion of the 1000-strong regiment at the battle of Nyaungyo.) converged on Prome, the gateway to central Burma. But the city's fortified defenses held out long enough. Finally, 5000 Ava troops arrived in 300 war boats to break up the siege, and chased Toungoo forces back to the delta. The Confederation's advance was halted at Inbyaw Island (အင်းပြောကျွန်း) where six Confederation commanders, including Gen. Nawrahta of Kanni, were captured in a naval battle.

It turned out to be the last battle of the season. Despite Takayutpi's repeated urges to push on, his allies decided not to proceed any further. A deeply frustrated Takayutpi died soon after while trying to catch wild elephants for his army. Narapati too died shortly after from dysentery.

== First interlude (1539–41) ==
An uneasy stalemate ensued. In order to consolidate his gains in Lower Burma, Tabinshwehti moved his capital to Pegu in 1539; reappointed former Hanthawaddy lords to their posts; and appointed many of them to the highest positions of his government. By successfully gaining the loyalty of Hanthawaddy officials, the king now controlled much of Lower Burma's manpower and trade wealth, and for the first time gained access to Portuguese mercenaries and their firearms. This fortuitous combination of Toungoo's "more martial culture", and Lower Burma's manpower, access to foreign firearms, and maritime wealth to pay for them would enable the men from a "small frontier outpost" to further wage war on their neighbors in the following decades.

Other polities in the region were now forced to act. The chiefs of the dormant Confederation finally agreed to prepare for war. The western kingdom of Arakan (Mrauk-U) agreed to an alliance with Ava to defend Prome. At Martaban, the only remaining independent Hanthawaddy province, its ruler Saw Binnya had completely fortified his wealthy port, and enlisted Portuguese mercenaries and warships in his service.

The Toungoo command decided to pick off Martaban first. In November 1540, three Toungoo armies (13,000 troops, 2,100 horses, 130 elephants), laid siege to Martaban. Seven months later, Toungoo forces brutally sacked the city, completing Toungoo's conquest of all three Hanthawaddy provinces. Although the siege presented the Confederation and Arakan with several opportunities to attack Toungoo's lightly defended northern perimeter and southern delta, (Note: Chronicles (Maha Yazawin Vol. 2 2006: 148–149) mention only Pegu and Toungoo with rearguard forces.) they took no action. Even after Martaban's fall, they still did not raise armies to reinforce Prome. They appeared to have calculated that Tabinshwehti would take a break in the upcoming dry season (as he took a break in 1539–40 after his 1538–39 campaign). By the start of the next dry season in November 1541, neither Ava nor Mrauk-U had raised any sizable standing armies that could be dispatched to Prome.

== Second Toungoo siege of Prome (1541–42) ==
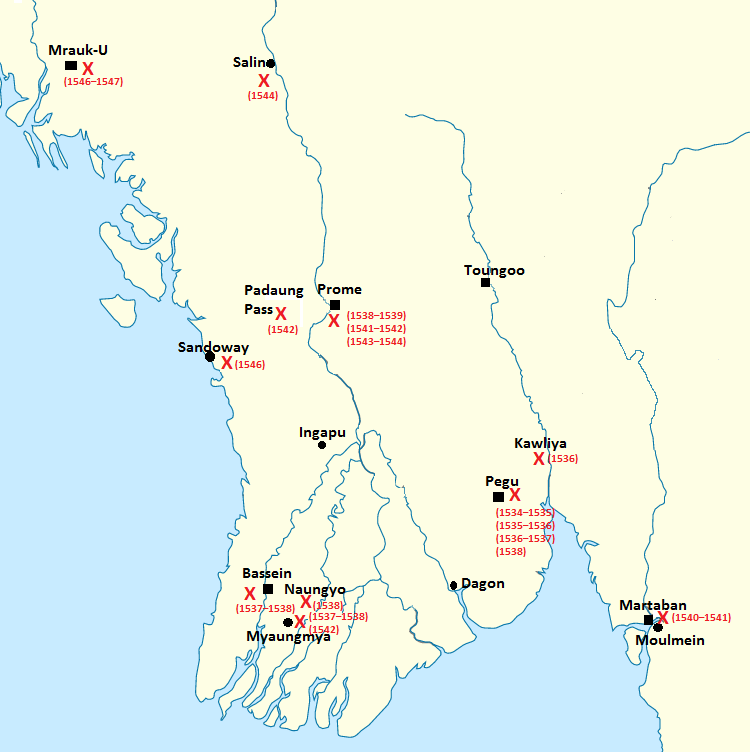
Toungoo campaigns (1534–47)

The allies' indecision and lack of preparation would come back to haunt them. It turned out that Tabinshwehti had decided to attack Prome right after the rainy season when no one expected him to. He secretly prepared for war throughout the rainy season (June to October) of 1541. Only King Minkhaung of Prome reinforced his city's defensive fortifications, and stockpiled supplies and provisions.

=== Siege of Prome ===
By November, Tabinshwehti had assembled a 17,000-strong naval and land invasion force, his largest mobilization to date. His 13 naval squadrons (9000 troops, nearly 1400 war boats and transport boats) were commanded by ethnic Mon lords of Lower Burma while his army (8000 troops, 2500 horses, 300 elephants) were led by himself and Bayinnaung. As in Martaban, his troops now included much prized Portuguese mercenaries and their firearms. Their plan was to take Prome quickly before Ava and Mrauk-U had time to come to its aid. In case of a long siege, they would take positions around the city that would prevent Ava and Arakan forces from linking up, and they would drive the enemy separately. They however did not plan for a large Arakanese seaborne invasion; the delta was largely undefended. They believed their war boats intended for Prome, if necessary, could sail down to meet the Arakanese navy in the delta. Only the capital Pegu was defended with a rearguard army.

Right after the Buddhist Lent, on 19 November 1541, Toungoo naval and land forces invaded. As expected, Confederation and Arakanese forces had not arrived. Taken by surprise, Prome's allies frantically raised their armies and navies. Their armies were to break the siege while the well-regarded Arakanese navy, equipped with Portuguese weaponry and mercenaries, was to invade the delta from the south.

Meanwhile, Toungoo forces launched attacks to take the city but could not break through the fortified city's musket and artillery fire. They were forced to set up a perimeter around the city.

=== Battle of northern Prome ===
The stalemate lasted for nearly five months. It was only in April 1542 that the Confederation armies (16,000 troops, 1,000 horses, 80 elephants), led by Thohanbwa and Hkonmaing I of Onbaung–Hsipaw, the chief of Onbaung, approached the northern perimeter. The armies consisted of troops from Upper Burma, as well as from four members of the Confederation (Mohnyin, Mogaung, Hsipaw, and Momeik). (Note: (Hmannan Vol. 2 2003: 216): Bhamo and Nyaungshwe could not raise men in time, and the army had left without them.)

To meet the enemy, Tabinshwehti fielded three armies, each of which consisted of 3,000 men, 700 horses, and 50 elephants. The overall commander Bayinnaung led one of the armies while Thiri Zeya Kyawhtin and Saw Lagun Ein respectively commanded armies to his left and right. One day's march north of Prome by the Irrawaddy, they waited with their artillery and muskets ready. Cavalry from both sides engaged first. Toungoo cavalry retreated, drawing Confederation cavalry and vanguard battalions into the firing zone, who were subsequently wiped out. The Ava command sent two more waves but both were driven back with heavy losses. Then, all three Toungoo armies counterattacked, with their elephant and cavalry corps leading the way. After a long battle, the Confederation armies were driven back. Over two thousand troops, including two of their commanders, over 300 horses, and 60 elephants were captured.

Though both sides suffered heavy casualties, it proved to be a strategically important victory for Toungoo since it took the Confederation out of the equation for the time being. (Soon after, Thohanbwa was assassinated by his chief minister, throwing the Confederation into another bout of leadership turmoil. The Confederation left the task of relieving its vassal Prome to Arakan alone.)

=== Preparations for Arakanese offensive ===
For Toungoo, there was no time to waste. Right after the battle, the Toungoo command received intelligence that the Arakanese army led by Min Aung Hla, Viceroy of Sandoway (Thandwe), (Note: Hmannan Yazawin (Hmannan Vol. 2 2003: 207) identifies him as the younger brother of Min Bin and governor of Sandoway. Rakhine Razawin Thit (Sandamala Linkara 1999: 32) identifies Min Aung Hla as the viceroy of Sandoway and Min Bin's younger brother.) was crossing the Arakan Yoma range at the Padaung Pass, and that a sizable Arakanese navy led by Crown Prince Min Dikkha (Note: Hmannan (Hmannan Vol. 2 2003: 207) identifies the admiral as "upayaza". Typically, Upayaza means the crown prince, who would have been Dikkha. Note however that Min Bin had a son by concubine Saw Nandi named Upayaza per (Sandamala Linkara 1999: 34). Still, "Upayza" in the standard chronicles means crown prince, not as a proper name. In fact, Hmannan (Hmannan Vol. 2 2003: 227) explicitly refers to the Mrauk-U crown prince as "Upayaza the son of the king (Min Bin)".) was sailing past Cape Negrais. They had expected a land invasion but the size of the Arakanese naval force caught them by surprise. It was late April 1542. (Note: The date inferred from Gen. Nanda Thingyan's assessment (Hmannan Vol. 2 2003: 208) that the siege was already five months long. The comment was made after Toungoo forces had defeated the Confederation armies, but before the battles with Arakan.)

To refill his depleted forces, Tabinshwehti immediately ordered his vassals to raise more men, and send more provisions. But there was not enough time. The Toungoo command was split as to what to do next. One faction led by Gen. Nanda Thingyan recommended lifting the siege, reasoning that it was more important to defend the delta. But others including Bayinnaung disliked an outright lifting of the siege because Prome's forces, they feared, could join in on an attack from the north. In the end, they settled on the proposal by Thiri Zeya Kyawhtin: (1) continue the appearance of a siege with a minimal force, (2) meet the enemy on both fronts, (3) if either front fails, lift the siege and defend the homeland, and (4) resume the siege if the Arakanese were defeated.

To defend the delta, they rushed four army and naval troops led by Smim Payu, Smim Bya Thamaik (later Minister-General Binnya Law), Smim Than-Kye, and Thiri Zeya Nawrahta. The four commanders were to defend four key delta towns (Myaungmya, Bassein, Khebaung, Dala). Smim Payu was the admiral of the southern Toungoo navy, which had the unenviable task of facing the highly experienced Arakanese navy. Nanda Yawda was appointed commander of the remaining Toungoo war boats at Prome. To meet the Arakanese army, Bayinnaung formed three armies, each consisted of 2000 troops, 800 horses, and 50 elephants. He personally commanded the center army while Thiri Zeya Kyawhtin and Nanda Thingyan led the armies to his left and right respectively. They quietly left their positions since they did not want the Prome command to know that only a skeleton crew was in charge of the "siege".

=== Battle of Padaung Pass ===
Meanwhile, the Arakanese army (5,000 troops, 200 horses, 100 elephants) had just come out of the Padaung pass. Its commander Min Aung Hla had set up camp about five marches away from Prome in order to gather intelligence. Unsure of the Arakanese strength, Bayinnaung plotted to lure the Arakanese to a place where he could ambush them. He sent five men pretending to be messengers from Prome, who informed the Arakanese command that Toungoo armies were still fighting Confederation forces north of the city, and that the Arakanese should attack the Toungoo armies from the rear. Armed with the misinformation, the unsuspecting Arakanese troops marched right into the trap, and were thoroughly routed by Toungoo muskets and artillery. Over 2000 were captured. Min Aung Hla and a few of his men barely escaped.

The victory came at a crucial time. The Arakanese navy had already taken Bassein and Myaungmya, two of the four key delta ports. But after hearing the news of their army's defeat, they decided to retreat. It was the best outcome the Toungoo command could have hoped for. Tabinshwehti was so pleased with Bayinnaung's victory that he appointed his childhood friend heir-apparent of his kingdom.

=== Prome's surrender ===
Prome was now totally on its own. Still in late April, Tabinshwehti renewed his ultimatum that Prome submit, or receive the fate of Martaban. Minkhaung still refused, hoping that Toungoo would retreat once the rainy season began in a month. But Tabinshwehti made it clear through his emissaries that he no longer had to worry about Ava or Arakan, and that he would continue the siege even during the rainy season. Finally, on 19 May 1542, Minkhaung accepted the offer of amnesty, and surrendered. (Note: Portuguese explorer Fernão Mendes Pinto (Pinto 1989: 328–333) described the sack of Prome and the punishments supposedly meted out to the inhabitants in great detail. However, GE Harvey (Harvey 1925: 342) calls Pinto's reporting inconsistent and highly unreliable.) Minkhaung and his chief queen Thiri Hpone-Htut were sent to Toungoo. Tabinshwehti appointed one of his fathers-in-law Shin Nita viceroy of Prome.

== Second interlude (1542–43) ==
Toungoo's foothold in central Burma had come at a great cost. After two consecutive exhaustive dry-season campaigns, not only was Toungoo in no position to proceed any further but it was also concerned with a possible invasion by the Confederation.

Toungoo was to get a much needed breather, however. For much of the rainy season of 1542, the Confederation chiefs were still coming to terms with their new leader Hkonmaing (son of Hkonmaing I of Onbaung), and had no time to plan for an invasion. Initially, the leadership of Mohnyin was deeply unsatisfied with Hkonmaing, who was put on the throne by the Ava court, not only because the heirs of Sawlon felt the throne of Ava was theirs but also because Hkonmaing's father was someone they bitterly fought against in the 1520s. In the end, in August/September 1542, (Note: (Hmannan Vol. 2 2003: 146): Tawthalin 904 ME = 11 August 1542 to 9 September 1542) the chiefs reluctantly decided to back Hkonmaing, and form a united front against a rising Toungoo. They agreed to invade Lower Burma in the dry season of 1543–44.

== Resumption of war (1543–45) ==
=== Preparations ===
The invasion would have to be by the Confederation itself. The chiefs apparently were not able to persuade King Min Bin of Arakan to stay in the alliance; Mrauk-U did not contribute any troops. By December 1543, the seven chiefs of the Confederation had assembled a large army (16,000 army troops, 1000 horses, 120 elephants) and a large navy (12,000 troops, 300 large war boats, 300 fast war boats, 500 cargo boats). They planned to take Prome with their massive naval and land forces; fortify Prome; launch an attack on Toungoo; and launch a joint attack on Pegu.

At Pegu, Tabinshwehti was ready. His land forces consisted of 12 regiments and 4 cavalry battalions (12,000 men, 800 horses, 80 elephants), and his navy consisted of 12 squadrons (9000 men, 800 large war boats, 300 fast war boats, 500 cargo boats). More importantly, his troops included foreign mercenaries who manned his much prized musket and artillery corps.

=== Battle of Prome ===
On 7 December 1543, the Confederation land and naval forces left Ava to start the invasion. The invaders easily overran Toungoo defenses en route to Prome, gaining complete control around Prome by late December. They launched several attacks on the city but could not take the city.

By then, the Toungoo command had determined that Ava would probably not open a second front. They moved most of their troops from the Toungoo theater, and massed all their land and naval forces at Tharrawaddy (Thayawadi), about 160 km south of Prome. In response, Hkonmaing lifted the siege, moved his army and navy to 3.2 km north of the city, and fortified their positions. (Note: (Hmannan Vol. 2 2003: 220): Hkonmaing retreated one taing (တိုင်), which is about 2 miles or 3.2 km per (Thein Hlaing 2011: 63))

The Toungoo navy led the counterattack. The larger and better equipped Toungoo war boats defeated smaller, less equipped Ava war boats. The surviving Ava war boats fled upriver, and were not heard from again. The Toungoo navy then sent 4,000 troops who bypassed Prome and went on to occupy Thayet and Myede, about 60 km north of Prome, and successfully cut off from the Ava supply lines. Ava armies in the north tried to regain the strategic towns but were driven back each time. About a month later, c. late January/early February 1544, the Confederation command decided to retreat.

The retreating Confederation forces had to fight off the Toungoo armies led by Bayinnaung. They split into four smaller armies, and made their way to Salin, about 200 km north of Myede.

=== Battle of Salin (1544) ===
Toungoo forces followed up on the retreating forces. Tabinshwehti himself led the navy while Bayinnaung commanded the army. The Confederation command, who had not expected a counteroffensive this deep into their own territory, were greatly concerned. They hastily planned to make a stand at Salin long enough for them to prepare their defenses farther (90 km) north in Pagan (Bagan). They left Mingyi Yan Taing, son of Governor Sithu Kyawhtin of Salin, in charge of the fortified city. But the plan did not work. Salin fell in just three days (after a section of the walls was mined and brought down). Tabinshwehti appointed Shin Thiha, one of his servants since his birth, governor of Salin with the title of Sithu Kyawhtin II.

=== Conquest of central Burma ===
The quick fall of Salin forced the Confederation armies to evacuate Pagan, and retreat farther north yet again. Toungoo forces now marched up to and took Pagan. Though Ava was now just another 160 km away, Tabinshwehti was unwilling to overstretch, and stopped the advance. At the ancient capital, he was crowned in the full ritual and ceremony of the great kings of Pagan. In order to consolidate his rule, he received oaths of allegiance by the hereditary chiefs and governors from the region, and appointed his loyalists to rule key towns. He set up sentinel garrisons at the new border with Ava. The king and the main army returned south in July/August 1544.

=== Battle of Salin (1544–45) ===
At Ava, the Confederation appeared unsure how to respond. On one hand, they were unwilling to launch another full-scale invasion lest they be exposed to another counterattack. On the other hand, they were not yet ready to cede all of central Burma uncontested. When the dry season of 1544 arrived, they saw no Toungoo armies on the horizon, and ultimately decided on a limited attack across the new ill-defined border. In late 1544, (Note: Chronicles (Hmannan Vol. 2 2003: 222–224) mention that the raid on Salin took place in year 906 ME. But since the entry on the raid came after the entry on Tabinshwehti's palace addition in Natdaw 906 ME (15 November 1544 to 13 December 1544), the raid most probably took place sometime between November 1544 and 29 March 1545, the last day of 906 ME.) they sent a small army (3,000 troops, 300 horses) led by Sithu Kyawhtin I down the Irrawaddy. The Confederation army overran the Toungoo frontier garrisons at the border. At Salin, a senior official loyal to Sithu Kyawhtin I revolted, driving out Sithu Kyawhtin II (Shin Thiha). Sithu Kyawhtin I entered Salin unopposed.

To be sure, this fortuitous takeover of Salin was backed by no additional Ava troops, and could not last. Sithu Kyawhtin II returned with a 7,000-strong army (2,000 horses, 15 elephants). Though his army was outnumbered more than two-to-one, Sithu Kyawhtin I chose to make a stand. But Salin's defenses were breached on the second day. Inside the city, Sithu Kyawhtin I fought atop his war elephant, and even engaged Sithu Kyawhtin II, who was also on his war elephant. In the end, Toungoo troops won the battle. Sithu Kyawhtin barely escaped, fleeing to the Chin Hills.

== Aftermath ==
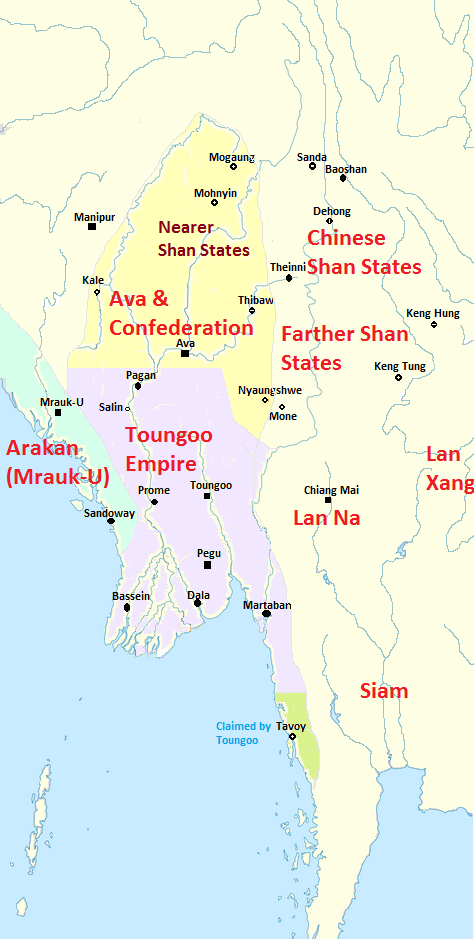
Toungoo Empire in 1545

Salin turned out to be the last battle of the war. After the successive battlefield defeats, the bickering between the Confederation's two main powers broke out in full force. Sawlon II of Mohnyin, who had only grudgingly agreed to Hkonmaing's takeover of the Ava throne, blamed Hkonmaing for the defeats, and now planned to put Sithu Kyawhtin I of Salin (Note: According to the chronicles (Hmannan Vol. 2 2003: 149), Sithu Kyawhtin and Sawlon II were thwethauk blood-bond brothers, "a sacramental brotherhood of some round table as it were" (Harvey 1925: 178). But according to Arthur Phayre (Phayre 1967: 106), Sithu Kyawhtin was a son of Sawlon, meaning he and Sawlon II were brothers.) on the Ava throne. In April/May 1545, Sawlon II sent Sithu Kyawhtin with an army (5000 men, 800 horses, 60 elephants), which went on to occupy Sagaing, the city directly across the Irrawaddy from Ava. During the rainy season, c. September 1545, Hkonmaing died, and was succeeded by his son Narapati III. The new king promptly sent a mission to Pegu to secure friendly relations in exchange for his recognition of the new de facto border between the two kingdoms. Tabinshwehti accepted the offer.

Toungoo's decisive victory gave the upstart kingdom control of all of central Burma, and cemented its emergence as the largest polity in Burma since the fall of Pagan Empire in 1287. Indeed, "there was once more a king in Burma". In the following years, Ava and Mohnyin-backed Sagaing would be locked in a war until 1551, while an emboldened Toungoo would turn its attention to conquering Arakan in 1545–47, and Siam in 1547–49.

== Bibliography ==
- Aung-Thwin, Michael A.; Maitrii Aung-Thwin (2012). A History of Myanmar Since Ancient Times (illustrated ed.). Honolulu: University of Hawai'i Press. ISBN 978-1-86189-901-9.
- Fernquest, Jon (Autumn 2005). "Min-gyi-nyo, the Shan Invasions of Ava (1524–27), and the Beginnings of Expansionary Warfare in Toungoo Burma: 1486–1539" (PDF). SOAS Bulletin of Burma Research. 3 (2).
- Harvey, G. E. (1925). History of Burma: From the Earliest Times to 10 March 1824. London: Frank Cass & Co. Ltd.
- Htin Aung, Maung (1967). A History of Burma. New York and London: Cambridge University Press.
- Kala, U (1724). Maha Yazawin (in Burmese). Vol. 1–3 (2006, 4th printing ed.). Yangon: Ya-Pyei Publishing.
- Lieberman, Victor B. (2003). Strange Parallels: Southeast Asia in Global Context, c. 800–1830, volume 1, Integration on the Mainland. Cambridge University Press. ISBN 978-0-521-80496-7.
- Phayre, Lt. Gen. Sir Arthur P. (1883). History of Burma (1967 ed.). London: Susil Gupta.
- Royal Historical Commission of Burma (1832). Hmannan Yazawin (in Burmese). Vol. 1–3 (2003 ed.). Yangon: Ministry of Information, Myanmar.
- Sandamala Linkara, Ashin (1931). Rakhine Razawin Thit (in Burmese). Vol. 1–2 (1997–1999 ed.). Yangon: Tetlan Sarpay.
- Sein Lwin Lay, Kahtika U (1968). Mintaya Shwe Hti and Bayinnaung: Ketumadi Taungoo Yazawin (in Burmese) (2006, 2nd printing ed.). Yangon: Yan Aung Sarpay.
- Thein Hlaing, U (2000). Research Dictionary of Burmese History (in Burmese) (2011, 3rd ed.). Yangon: Khit-Pya Taik.
