= Sithu Kyawhtin =

Sithu Kyawhtin Narapati IV of Ava စည်သူကျော်ထင်

King of Ava
- Reign: c. October 1551 – 22 January 1555
- Predecessor: Narapati III
- Successor: Thado Minsaw (as Viceroy)
- Chief Minister: Baya Yandathu
- Born: November/December 1495; Wednesday, 857 ME (Note: Zatadawbon Yazawin (Zata 1960: 47) says he was born on a Wednesday in the tenth month (Pyatho) of 853 ME. But the standard chronicles Maha Yazawin (Maha Yazawin Vol. 2 2006: 129) and Hmannan Yazawin (Hmannan Vol. 2 2003: 159) both correct it to 857 ME. The Burmese numerals 3 (၃) and 7 (၇) can be similar when written longhand. Moreover, because 857 ME was an intercalary leap year, the tenth month was Nadaw (18 November to 16 December 1495). Since he was born on a Wednesday, his birth date was one of: 18, 25 November, or 2, 9, 16 December 1495.)
- Died: Pegu
- Spouses: Narapati Mibaya; Salin Mibaya (m. 1530s–1544)
- Issue: Mingyi Yan Taing
- House: Mohnyin
- Religion: Theravada Buddhism

Sithu Kyawhtin (Burmese: စည်သူကျော်ထင်, pronounced [sìθù tɕɔ̀tʰɪ̀ɰ̃]; also known as Narapati Sithu (နရပတိ စည်သူ, [nəɹa̰pətḭ sìθù])) was the last king of Ava from 1551 to 1555. He came to power by overthrowing King Narapati III in 1551, the culmination of his six-year rebellion (1545–1551) with the support of the Shan state of Mohnyin.

As king, he was able to get all members of the Confederation of Shan States to unite against an impending invasion by King Bayinnaung of Toungoo Dynasty. He sought a peace treaty with Bayinnaung but was rebuffed. The Ava-led Confederation withstood the initial invasion by Toungoo in 1553 but could not stop a larger invasion a year later. The fallen king spent his remaining years in an estate at Pegu (Bago). He repaid the good treatment by suppressing the 1565 rebellion at the capital while Bayinnaung was away in Chiang Mai. He was given many honors by Bayinnaung.

== Background ==
Little is known about the background of this king. According to the chronicle Zatadawbon Yazawin, he was an ethnic Burman. (Note: Zatadawbon Yazawin (Zata 1960: 47) specifically notes that he was an ethnic Burman (Bamar).) But colonial period historians Arthur Purves Phayre and G.E. Harvey called him an ethnic Shan. Phayre went as far to say that he was a son of Sawlon I of Mohnyin, the conqueror of Ava. Neither historian provided citations for their assertions however. The standard Burmese chronicles Maha Yazawin and Hmannan Yazawin only say that Sithu Kyawhtin was a thwethauk brother of Sawlon II of Mohnyin. (Thwethauk means men who have ritually entered into "a sacramental brotherhood" by drinking each other's blood. (Note: (Harvey 1925: 178): thwethauk means "a sacramental brotherhood of some round table as it were".))

== Governor of Salin ==
Even if he was not biologically related to the ruling clan of the Shan state of Mohnyin, the chronicle accounts clearly show that Sithu Kyawhtin was a close ally of Mohnyin. In the 1530s, during the reign of King Thohanbwa of Mohnyin, Sithu Kyawhtin was governor of Salin, a strategic city on the Irrawaddy River about 250 km south of Ava (Inwa). That King Narapati of Prome in the late 1530s sent his sister Salin Mibaya to Sithu Kyawhtin in marriage of state shows that Sithu Kyawhtin was probably a powerful figure in Thohanbwa's administration. Sithu Kyawhtin contributed to Ava's war effort against Toungoo but lost his city to advancing Toungoo (Taungoo) forces in 1544. In the following dry season campaign of 1544–45, he was able to retake Salin briefly but his small army of 3000 men was eventually defeated by larger Toungoo forces. He barely escaped, fleeing west alone by himself to Kale (Kalay), a vassal of Mohnyin, and then to Chin Hills.

At the Chin Hills, he was found by a local chief, Gophung of Vangteh, a Guite chief, and his son Zamang, who sent him to Mohnyin (Lensumkai in local reference) at his choice. A local poetic song is still in use in Vangteh in commemorating of the peace they promised to each other. The song, ascribed to be composed by Manpau, the grandson of Gophung, in their local language, says as follow:

Zaang gamlei a mucinpu, Simgam dawhlei tam tungah na kuailo zeen aw.
Sinthu khem nong piak a leh, Tung Pasian aw, na pai aw. Na khan tom ta’nteh.

(Free translation):

Eagle of the plain land, you are at peace in my mansion built on the high land.
If you give me wrong promise (or fail to keep your promise), let the God of heaven come to you. And you will not long live.

== Ruler of Sagaing ==
=== Vassal of Mohnyin ===
At Mohnyin, Sithu Kyawhtin became a central figure in his thwethauk brother Sawlon II's plan to overthrow King Hkonmaing at Ava. The ruler of Mohnyin had been deeply dissatisfied with Hkonmaing (of the Shan state of Onbaung), who was put on the Ava throne by the court in 1542 after Thohanbwa (of Mohnyin) was assassinated. Sawlon II believed the throne of Ava rightfully belonged to Mohnyin since it was his father Sawlon I who led the Confederation of Shan States to the victory over King Narapati II of Ava in 1527, and it was his elder brother Thohanbwa who ruled Ava between 1527 and 1542. But Sawlon II along with other chiefs of the Confederation reluctantly agreed to Hkonmaing as the new king of Ava because of the impending Toungoo threat. However, after successive military defeats that allowed the Toungoo takeover of central Burma to Pagan (Bagan), Sawlon II had enough of Hkonmaing's leadership. In April/May 1545, he sent Sithu Kyawhtin with an army (5000 men, 800 horses, 60 elephants) to overthrow Hkonmaing.

Sithu Kyawhtin and his army took over Sagaing, the city on the left bank of the Irrawaddy right across from Ava, but could not take a heavily fortified Ava. The rump Ava Kingdom had now further split into two halves: the Mohnyin-controlled west of the Irrawaddy (present-day Sagaing Region and southern Kachin State), and Hsipaw/Onbaung-controlled eastern half (approximately, northern Mandalay Region and western Shan State). The two halves remained at war even after Hkonmaing's death c. September 1545. With a closer enemy massed across the river, the new king of Ava, Narapati III immediately sued for peace with Toungoo, and ceded central Burma to Toungoo in exchange for peace.

With his southern border secure, Narapati III tried to regain control of Sagaing. He first sent a mission to Sithu Kyawhtin to submit, which was refused. He then attacked Sagaing, which was repelled. Meanwhile, Sithu Kyawhtin proved to be an able ruler and gained the support of the populace in the region. He even released prisoners of war after treating them of their wounds, allowing them to go wherever they pleased. Many came over and joined his forces. Over the next few years, he became a powerful ruler in his own right.

=== Independent ally of Mohnyin ===
Sithu Kyawhtin's popularity and increasingly independent policies were seen as a threat by his hitherto overlord Sawlon II. Circa 1548/49, (Note: Inferred date. Chronicles (Maha Yazawin Vol. 2 2006: 125) and (Hmannan Vol. 2 2003: 151) do not say when exactly Sawlon II's expedition to Sagaing took place. Since the entry came before the entry dated Tagu 911 ME (March/April 1549), the event likely took place in the dry-season of 1548–49.) Sawlon II marched to Sagaing only to see that his nominal vassal was now in much stronger position. The two thwethauk brothers met near the Ponnya Shin Pagoda near Sagaing, and amicably worked out the differences. Sawlon agreed to withdraw. The two rulers remained allies.

=== Takeover of Ava ===
Sithu Kyawhtin renewed the war with Ava in September 1551. (Note: (Hmannan Vol. 2 2003: 151): The news of the attack was received by Bayinnaung while he was at Prome (Pyay) soon after his conquest of the city. Per (Hmannan Vol. 2 2003: 268), Toungoo forces took Prome on 30 August 1551.) He may have been prompted into action by the new Toungoo king Bayinnaung's campaigns to restore the Toungoo Empire. Indeed, Bayinnaung and his forces attempted to invade Upper Burma in late September while Sithu Kyawhtin's Sagaing forces were laying siege to Ava. But Toungoo forces decided to deal with Pegu first, and pulled back. Soon after, King Narapati III gave up, and fled south to join Bayinnaung.

== King of Ava ==
=== Consolidation and war preparations ===
Sithu Kyawhtin ascended to the Ava throne as Narapati IV. It was circa October 1551. (Note: Chronicles (Maha Yazawin Vol. 2 2006: 129) and (Hmannan Vol. 2 2003: 159) say he was 56 (in 57th year) when he became king of Ava. It means he came to power before turning 57 in Nadaw 913 ME (30 October to 27 November 1551). Per (Hmannan Vol. 2 2003: 268–269), he had not gained Ava in late September 1551 when Bayinnaung tried to invade Upper Burma before withdrawing. Thus, he most probably came to power in October.) Knowing that Bayinnaung would return, he immediately set out to secure the alliance of all Confederation states, including those of Onbaung–Thibaw, the native state of Narapati III and of Mohnyin. Facing an existential threat, the Confederation states pledged their full support, sending troops, food and arms in preparation for the invasion from the south. He also tried diplomacy, hoping that he could avoid a war. In the dry season of 1552–1553, an Ava embassy led by the governor of Saga Taung arrived at Pegu (Bago) where they were politely received by the Pegu court led by ministers Binnya Dala and Daw Binnya. The Ava mission stayed there for three months but returned empty handed without a peace treaty.

=== War with Toungoo ===
Sithu Kyawhtin now fully expected war, though it came sooner than he expected. On 14 June 1553, Bayinnaung sent two 7000-strong armies led by Crown Prince Nanda and Minkhaung II of Toungoo to invade Upper Burma. By launching a campaign in the rainy season, the Toungoo command may have hoped to secure the element of surprise. But Sithu Kyawhtin had enough reserves (5000 men) who held off the invasion force at Tada-U until his allies (Mohnyin, Mogaung, Momeit, Onbaung, and Bhamo) came to his aid with 12,000 men. Toungoo forces facing rainy season conditions retreated.

The respite lasted for a little over a year. In November 1554, Toungoo forces launched a two-pronged invasion, one up the Sittaung valley and the other up the Irrawaddy valley. Avan defenses, supported by nine Confederation armies from (Bhamo, Kale, Mogaung, Mohnyin, Momeik, Mone, Nyaungshwe, Theinni and Onbaung-Thibaw), could not stop the advance, and the capital Ava fell to the southern forces on 22 January 1555. Sithu Kyawhtin and his five servants in disguise slipped out of the city, and fled east to join the Onbaung saopha's forces but were captured en route at Mekkhaya. The fallen king was subsequently sent to Pegu to live in exile.

== Life at Pegu ==
At Pegu, the former king was given an estate with over thirty servants. He repaid Bayinnaung's good treatment. In March/April 1565, while Bayinnaung was in Chiang Mai, a rebellion broke out in Pegu. Sithu Kyawhtin was called in for help to suppress the rebellion. He suppressed the rebellion. Bayinnaung, pleased with Sithu Kyawhtin's work, he gave Sithu Kyawhtin many more honors. He was one of four former kings (along with Mobye Narapati of Ava, Mekuti of Lan Na and Maha Chakkraphat of Siam) honored by Bayinnaung at the opening ceremony of the newly rebuilt Kanbawzathadi Palace on 16 March 1568.

== Bibliography ==
- Harvey, G. E. (1925). History of Burma: From the Earliest Times to 10 March 1824. London: Frank Cass & Co. Ltd.
- Kala, U (1724). Maha Yazawin (in Burmese). Vol. 1–3 (2006, 4th printing ed.). Yangon: Ya-Pyei Publishing.
- Phayre, Lt. Gen. Sir Arthur P. (1883). History of Burma (1967 ed.). London: Susil Gupta.
- Royal Historical Commission of Burma (1832). Hmannan Yazawin (in Burmese). Vol. 1–3 (2003 ed.). Yangon: Ministry of Information, Myanmar.
- Thaw Kaung, U (2010). Aspects of Myanmar History and Culture. Yangon: Gangaw Myaing.
- Zam, Ngul Lian. Mualthum Kampau Guite Hausate Tangthu. Amazon/CreateSpace, United States. ISBN 978-1721693559

Sithu Kyawhtin Ava Kingdom Born: Nov/Dec 1495 Died: ?
Regnal titles
Preceded by Narapati III	King of Ava c. October 1551 – 22 January 1555	Succeeded by Thado Minsaw of Ava as Viceroy of Ava
