= Möng Mit =

Former Shan state in Burma

Coordinates: 23°7′N 96°41′E

Möng Mit မိူင်းမိတ်ႈ
- c. 1238–1959
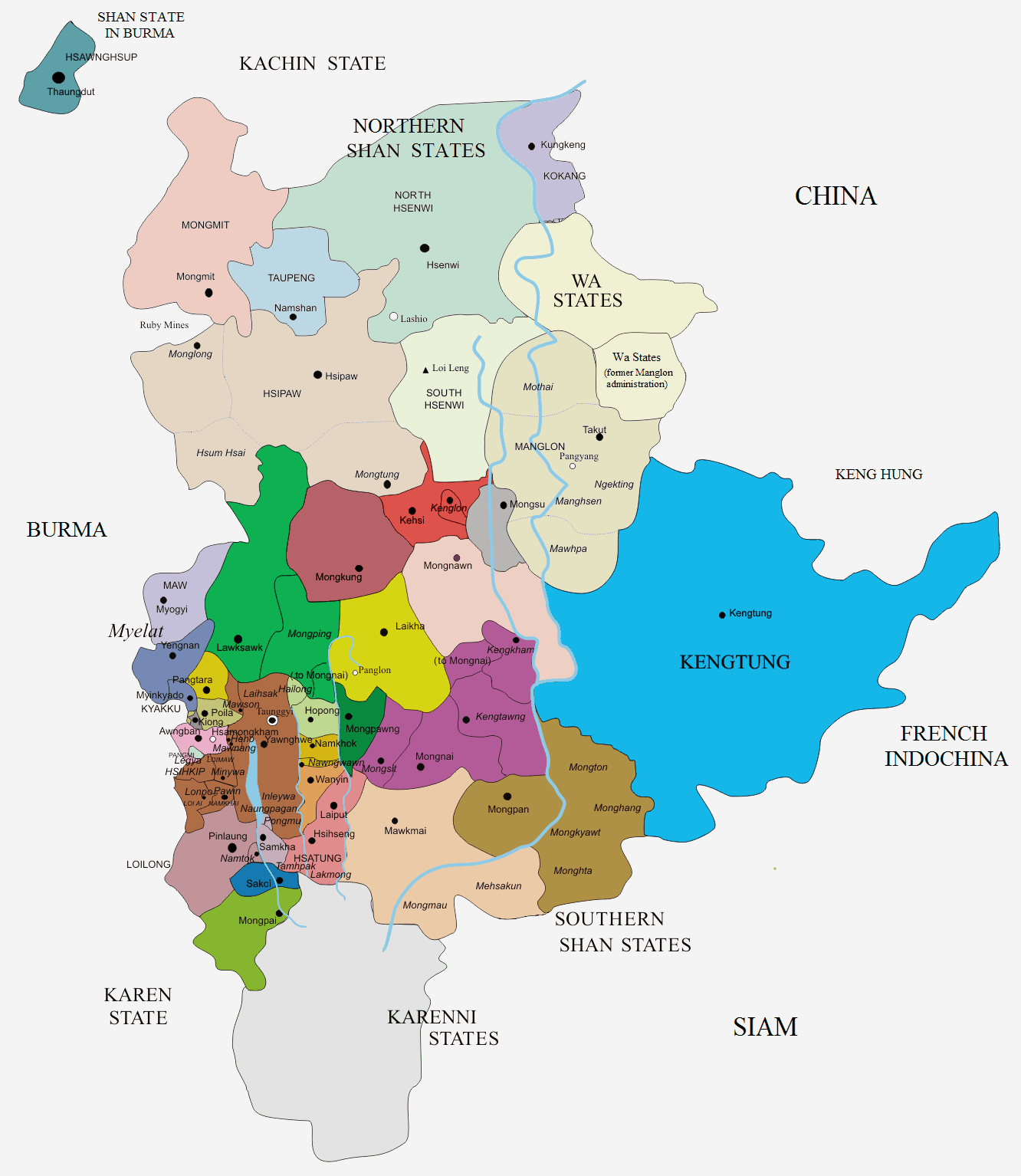
- Möng Mit in a map of the Shan States
- Capital: Möng Mit
- History
  - Established: c. 1238
  - Abdication of the last Saopha: 1959

Area
- 1901: 9,225 km^{2} (3,562 sq mi)

Population
  - 1901: 44,208
Preceded by	Succeeded by
Pagan kingdom	Shan State

Möng Mit (Shan: မိူင်းမိတ်ႈ; Tai Nüa: ᥛᥫᥒᥰ ᥛᥤᥖ), also known as Momeik (Burmese: မိုးမိတ်), was a Shan state in the Northern Shan States in what is today Burma. The capital was Mongmit town. The state included the townships of Mongmit and Kodaung (Kawdaw, now Mabein Township).

== History ==
According to tradition Möng Mit has its origins in an ancient state named Gandhalaraṭṭha that was founded before 1000 AD. Möng Mit was founded around 1238. Möng Mit became a district of Hsenwi in 1413 as a reward for the Hsenwi's services in the Ming dynasty's campaigns against Lan Na and the Ava kingdom. In 1450, Nang Han Lung, the daughter-in-law of the Saopha (Sawbwa in Burmese) of Möng Mit rebelled against Hsenwi. In 1465, she sent ruby as separate tribute from Hsenwi and succeeded in keeping the former possessions of Hsenwi, and was officially recognized as independent in 1484, when at the same time Mogok was ceded to the Burmese kings. It was however not until 1597 that the Saopha of Möng Mit was forced to exchange Mogok and Kyatpyin with Tagaung, and they were formally annexed by royal edict.

Earlier in 1542, the Shan ruler of Ava, Thohanbwa (1527–1543), marched with the Saophas of Möng Mit, Möng Yang, Hsipaw, Möng Kawng, Man Maw and Yawnghwe to come to the aid of Prome against the rising Tangoo dynasty, but he was defeated by Bayinnaung. In 1544, Hkonmaing (1543-6), the Saopha of Hsipaw and successor to Thohanbwa, attempted to regain Prome, with the help of Möng Mit, Möng Yang, Möng Nai, Hsenwi, Man Maw and Yawnghwe, only to be defeated by King Tabinshwehti (1512–1550).

Bayinnaung succeeded in three campaigns, 1556–9, to reduce the Shan states of Möng Mit, Möng Yang, Möng Kawng, Möng Pai, Samka, Lawksawk, Yawnghwe, Hsipaw, Bhamo, Kalay, Chiang Mai, and Lan Xang, before he raided up the Taping and Shweli Rivers in 1562.

A bell donated by King Bayinnaung (1551–1581) at Shwezigon Pagoda in Bagan has inscriptions in Burmese, Pali and Mon recording the conquest of Möng Mit and Hsipaw on 25 January 1557, and the building of a pagoda at Möng Mit on 8 February 1557.

=== British rule ===
In 1840, prior to British rule, the state of Möng Mit was divided between two sons on the death of their father, one ruling in Möng Mit and the other in Möng Leng (Mohlaing). Around the time of the British annexation, the Saopha of Möng Mit had just died, leaving his three year old son as heir, and the administration at Möng Mit was weak. Hkam Leng (Kan Hlaing), a pretender from the Möng Leng branch of the ruling family, came to claim rulership over Möng Mit, but he was rejected by the ministers, after which he began to try to establish himself in the state by force of arms. In 1887, after some small expeditions were sent against him, Hkam Leng was outlawed and the territory of Möng Leng was partitioned between Möng Mit and the Bhamo district to the north. A Burmese prince called Saw Yan Naing, who had risen up against the British, fled to the area and joined forces with Hkam Leng, and caused a great deal of problems during 1888–9 to the Hampshire Regiment stationed at Möng Mit.

Sao Hkun Hkio, Saopha of Möng Mit, was one of the seven Saophas on the executive committee of the Shan State Council formed after the first Panglong Conference in March 1946. On 16 January 1947, they sent two memoranda, whilst a Burmese delegation headed by Aung San was in London, to the British Labour government of Clement Attlee demanding equal political footing as Burma proper and full autonomy of the Federated Shan States. He was not one of the six Saophas who signed the Panglong Agreement on 12 February 1947. The Cambridge-educated Sao Hkun Hkio however became the longest serving Foreign Minister of Burma after independence in 1948 until the military coup of Ne Win in 1962, with only short interruptions, the longest one of which being between 1958 and 1960 during Ne Win's caretaker government.

== Rulers ==
The rulers of Möng Mit bore the title of Saohpa; their ritual style was Gantalarahta Maha Thiriwuntha Raza.

=== Saophas ===
- 60?–6??: Hkun Han Hpa (6th son of Hkun Lu)
- 939–9??: Hso Ngan Hpa
- 1122–1168: Hkun Hkam Kyen Hken Hpa
- 1168–1185: Hkun Ta Ka (son)
- 1185–1250: Hkun Kome (son)
- 1250–1308: Hkun Yi Khwai Hkam (son)
- 1308–1310: Hkun Hpo Srang Kang (son)
- 1310–1345: Hkun Tai Hkone (bro)
- 1345–1380: Hkun Tai Khaing (son)
- 1380–1393: Hkun Tai Han (son)
- 1393–1430: Hso Mawk Hpa (son)
- 1430–1440: Hso Pot Hpa (son)
- 1440–1484: Hso Han Hpa (son)
- 1484–1487: Hso Waing Hpa (bro)
- 1487–1499: Hso Muew Hpa (son)
- 1499–1524: Hso Loum Hpa (bro)
- 1524–1528: Hso Kyoen Hpa (bro)
- 1528–1545: Hso Hsao Hpa (son of Sao Hkun Möng of Hsipaw)
- 1545–1556: Hso Het Hpa (son)
- 1556–1564: Hso Hsong Hpa (bro)
- 1564–1580: Hso Hsawng Hpa (bro)
- 1580–1596: Hso Soum Hpa (son of Hso Het Hpa)
- 1596–1601: Hso Kyaung Hpa (son)
- 1601–1605: Hso Hung Hpa (bro)
- 1605–1628: Hso Yawn Hpa (son of Hso Kyaung Hpa)
- 1628–1650: Hso Piam Hpa (son of Hso Yawn Hpa)
- 1650–1687: Hso Kya Hpa (son)
- 1687–1718: Hso Len Hpa (son)
- 1718–1750: Hso Lip Hpa (son)
- 1750–1787: Hso Pim Hpa (son)
- 1787–1796: Hso Tap Hpa (son)
- 1796–1817: Hso Ka Hpa (son)
- 1817–1830: Hso Hke Hpa (son)
- 1830–1837: Sao Möng Hkam from Mawkmai (son)
- 1837–1851: Sao Möng Eint
- 1851–1858: Sao Hkun Te
- 1858–1861: Sao Haw Kyin
- 1861–1862: Maung Kaw San (Regent)
- 1862–1868: Sao Möng Nyunt
- 1868–1874: Sao Hkam Maing
- 1874–1887: Sao Kang Hom Möng
- 31 January 1887 – 3 February 1937: Sao Kyè Möng Hkwan (Sao Khine Maung or Sao Khine Möng)
- 3 February 1937 – 1952: Sao Hkun Hkio (b. 1912)
