= Thihathu (disambiguation) =

Thihathu (Burmese: သီဟသူ) was a Burmese royal title, and may refer to:

== Kings ==
- Thihathu: Co-Founder of Myinsaing Kingdom (r. 1297–1310) and founder of Pinya Kingdom (r. 1310–25)
- Thihathu of Ava: King of Ava (r. 1421–25), a.k.a. Viceroy Thihathu II of Prome (r. 1416–19)
- Narapati I of Ava: King of (r. 1442–68), a.k.a. Viceroy Thihathu III of Prome (r. 1429–42)
- Thihathura I of Ava: King of Ava (r. 1468–80)
- Thihathura II of Ava: Joint-King of Ava (r. 1485–1501)
- Minye Thihathu I of Toungoo: Viceroy of Toungoo (r. 1540–49)
- Minye Thihathu II of Toungoo: King of Toungoo (r. 1597–1609), Viceroy of Toungoo (r. 1584–97)

== Royalty ==
- Thihathu of Pagan: Son of King Uzana, half-brother of King Narathihapate
- Thihathu I of Prome: Viceroy of Prome (1278–88)
