= Samka State =

Former Shan state in modern-day Burma/Myanmar

Coordinates: 20°09′19″N 96°56′42″E

Samka (Burmese: Saga) was a Shan state in the Central Division of the Southern Shan States in what is today Burma.
