= Shwenankyawshin =

Shwenankyawshin Narapati II of Ava ရွှေနန်းကြော့ရှင် နရပတိ

King of Ava
- Reign: 7 April 1501 – 14 March 1527
- Coronation: 18 April 1501 or 10 May 1501
- Predecessor: Minkhaung II
- Successor: Thohanbwa
- Born: 28 July 1476; Sunday, 8th waxing of Tawthalin 838 ME (Note: Chronicles report his birth date as follows: Zatadawbon Yazawin: Sunday, 5 nekkhats in the 8th month [Tazaungmon] of 838 ME; Maha Yazawin: Tuesday born; Yazawin Thit: Sunday, 8th waxing of Tawthalin; Hmannan: Tuesday, 8th waxing of Tawthalin; The 8th waxing of Tawthalin 838 ME translates to Sunday, 28 July 1476. It shows that the Yazawin Thit's date is correct; the Hmannan's retention of Tuesday from the Maha Yazawin is incorrect; and that the Zatadawbon's 8th month is a typographical error since Tawthalin is typically the sixth month in a regular (non-leap) year.); Ava (Inwa)
- Died: 14 March 1527 (aged 50); 12th waxing of Late Tagu 888 ME; Ava
- Spouse: Salin Minthami; Salin Minthami Lat; Dhamma Dewi; Taungdwin Mibaya; Min Taya Hnamadaw
- Issue: Mingyi Nyo; Mingyi Htwe; Baydaw Hnama; Sanda Dewi
Names
- Min Swe
- House: Mohnyin
- Father: Minkhaung II
- Mother: Atula Thiri Dhamma Dewi
- Religion: Theravada Buddhism

Shwenankyawshin Narapati (Burmese: ရွှေနန်းကြော့ရှင် နရပတိ, pronounced [ʃwè náɰ̃ tɕɔ̰ ʃɪ̀ɰ̃ nəɹa̰pətḭ], Shan: Sao Kyaw Haw Hkam; 28 July 1476 – 14 March 1527) was king of Ava from 1501 to 1527. His reign saw the disintegration of the Ava Kingdom. He spent much of his reign fighting back the attacks from the Confederation of Shan States. But his efforts ultimately proved unsuccessful. The king died fighting while defending his capital from Confederation attacks, after which Ava Kingdom was taken over by the Confederation.

== Early life and accession ==
Shwenankyawshin was born Min Swe to King Minkhaung II and Chief Queen Atula Thiri Dhamma Dewi on 28 July 1476. He was the second of four children of the couple. He had an elder brother Thihatura II and two younger sisters Soe Min and Min Pwa Saw. As the second eldest son of the chief queen, Min Swe was a senior prince but was not the heir apparent. Minkhaung II upon his accession anointed his eldest son Thihathura II heir apparent, and him the joint-king in 1485. The arrangement stayed until March 1501 when Thihathura II suddenly died, and Shwenankyawshin was made the heir-apparent. But when Minkhaung II also died a month later on 7 April 1501 (5th waning of Late Tagu 862 ME), Shwenankyawshin found himself king. His coronation took place on either 18 April 1501 (1st waxing of Kason 863 ME) or 10 May 1501 (9th waning of Kason 863). In the Burmese royal tradition, he took the chief queen of Thihathura as his chief queen.

== Reign ==
=== Start of rebellions ===
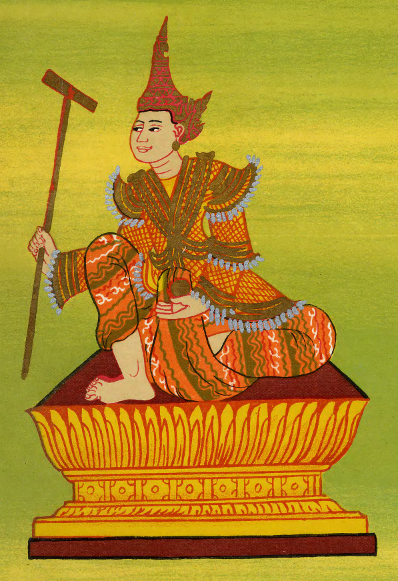
Nawrahta of Yamethin, now remembered as the Shwe Nawrahta nat (spirit), was drowned for orchestrating an attempted assassination of his uncle Shwenankyawshin

Like his predecessors before him, the new king at Ava had to reestablish his authority over the vassal states. At first, the long-term rebellion by his uncle Minye Kyawswa of Yamethin ended with the latter's death in June/July 1501 (Waso 863 ME, 16 June to 15 July 1501). But rebellions resumed almost immediately. In November/December 1501 (Natdaw 863 ME, 11 November to 9 December 1501), Nawrahta of Yamethin, the eldest son of Thihathura II, sent an assassin to kill Shwenankyawshin, which nearly succeeded. Both the assassin and Nawrahta were caught. Nawrahta, being of royal blood, was drowned.

=== War with the Confederation of Shan states ===
However, anti-Ava forces had increasingly become more pronounced in his reign. Throughout his reign, the Confederation of Shan States, made up of former Ava vassal states, launched their relentless attacks, and gradually absorbed Avan territory from the north, while their ally Prome (Pyay) took Avan territory in the south. In 1505–1506, the Confederation forces led by Sawlon, the saopha of Mohnyin, raided Avan territory all the way down to Dabayin while Prome raided up to Magwe in 1508–1509. A desperate Narapati tried to keep Toungoo (Taungoo) as an ally by giving the all-important Kyaukse granary to the nominally vassal kingdom but Mingyi Nyo of Toungoo declared independence in October 1510, and gave no help. Ava's only steadfast ally was Hsipaw (Thibaw) led by its saopha Hkonmaing I of Onbaung–Hsipaw.

Troubles continued. Sawlon seized Bhamo, Hsipaw's vassal in 1511, and raided deep into Upper Burma in 1517–1518. In 1519, the Shan state of Kale also revolted, and Ava had to reclaim it. By the early 1520s, Avan territory had shrunk so much that it was not much bigger than its former vassal states. In late 1523, the Confederation and Prome jointly attacked Ava's territories from the north and the south. Ava with Hsipaw fought back but gradually got squeezed in. A year and half later, on 22 March 1525, the combined armies sacked Ava, forcing Narapati and Hkonmaing to flee the city. In 1527, the Confederation forces again came back and laid siege to Ava. On 14 March 1527, the king died from a gunshot wound while fighting in the battle. The Confederation took Ava, and their leader Sawlon made his son Thohanbwa king of Ava, making it just another Shan state. The conquest ended Ava's 163-year (1364–1527) role as the dominant power in Upper Burma (Myanmar). Many people from Ava fled to Toungoo, the only remaining safe haven.

== Namesake ==
The king is posthumously remembered as Shwenankyawshin (lit. "Lord of Exquisite Golden Palace) because he built a new "exquisite golden palace" at Ava on 22 February 1511 (Saturday, 9th waning of Tabaung 872 ME).

== Bibliography ==
- Harvey, G. E. (1925). History of Burma: From the Earliest Times to 10 March 1824. London: Frank Cass & Co. Ltd.
- Kala, U (2006) [1724]. Maha Yazawin (in Burmese). Vol. 1–3 (4th printing ed.). Yangon: Ya-Pyei Publishing.
- Khin Khin Aye (January 2007). "Inscription record of Shwenankyawshin Narapati's Ava Palace construction". Myanmar Vista Research Magazine (in Burmese). 1 (1). Yangon.
- Royal Historians of Burma (1960) [c. 1680]. U Hla Tin (Hla Thamein) (ed.). Zatadawbon Yazawin (in Burmese). Historical Research Directorate of the Union of Burma.
- Royal Historical Commission of Burma (2003) [1832]. Hmannan Yazawin (in Burmese). Vol. 1–3. Yangon: Ministry of Information, Myanmar.
- Sein Lwin Lay, Kahtika U (2006) [1968]. Mintaya Shwe Hti and Bayinnaung: Ketumadi Taungoo Yazawin (in Burmese) (2nd printing ed.). Yangon: Yan Aung Sarpay.
- Tun Aung Chain (2004). Selected writings of Tun Aung Chain. Myanmar Historical Commission.

Shwenankyawshin Ava Kingdom Born: 28 July 1476 Died: 14 March 1527
Regnal titles
Preceded by Minkhaung II	King of Ava; 7 April 1501 – 14 March 1527	Succeeded by Thohanbwa
Royal titles
Preceded by Thihathura II	Heir to the Burmese Throne; 4 March 1501 – 7 April 1501	Succeeded by Mobye Narapati
