= Mobye Narapati =

Mobye Narapati Narapati III of Ava မိုးဗြဲ နရပတိ

King of Ava
- Reign: c. September 1545 – c. October 1551
- Predecessor: Hkonmaing
- Successor: Narapati IV
- Born: May 1516; Saturday, Nayon 878 ME (Note: According to (Hmannan Vol. 2 2003: 152), he was a Saturday born, and came to power at age 29 (30th year) and lost power at age 35 (36th year), meaning he was born in 1516. Note that the dates for Hkonmaing and Narapati III in Zatadawbon Yazawin (Zata 1960: 47) are flipped since the son fell from power at age 43, four years after his father had died at age 36! According to the corrected entry in Zata, he was born in the third month, Nayon. Nayon 878 ME translates to 2 May to 30 May 1516. Since he was born on a Saturday, his birth date was any one of: 3, 10, 17 or 24 May 1516.)
- Died: Unknown; Pegu (Bago)
- Issue: Khin Aung Kham
- House: Hsipaw
- Father: Hkonmaing
- Religion: Theravada Buddhism

Mobye Narapati (Burmese: မိုးဗြဲ နရပတိ, pronounced [móbjɛ́ nəɹa̰pətḭ]; Narapati III of Ava) also Sao Hso Kaw Hpa of Mong Pai was the penultimate king of Ava who reigned from 1545 to 1551. The ethnically Shan king ruled as the disputed leader of the Confederation of Shan states that had ruled Ava since 1527. He ended the seven years' war with Toungoo as soon as he came to power. Throughout his six years of reign, he faced an active rebellion by Sithu Kyawhtin, who was supported by the Shan state of Mohnyin. He controlled only a rump state, east of the Irrawaddy and north of Pagan (Bagan). After he was finally driven out of Ava (Inwa) in October 1551, he fled south to Pegu (Bago) where he was given protection by King Bayinnaung of Toungoo Dynasty. He lived out his years at Pegu.

== Early life ==
The future king was a son of Hkonmaing, who was saopha (chief) of the Shan state of Onbaung–Hsipaw (Thibaw) his personal name in Shan language is Hso Kaw Hpa of Mong Pai . His father later appointed him chief of Mobye (present day northern Kayah State), which was a vassal state of Onbaung–Hsipaw. He remained in Mobye even when his father was elected by the Ava court to become king of Ava in 1542. Three tumultuous years later, after his father's death c. September 1545, the 29-year-old chief of Mobye succeeded the Ava throne with the royal style of Narapati III.

== Reign ==
Narapati III inherited not only an ongoing war with Toungoo but also an active Mohnyin-backed rebellion in Sagaing by Sithu Kyawhtin. The territory he inherited was already badly splintered. The Ava "Kingdom" had already lost all of Central Burma from Pagan (Bagan) southward since 1544, and further split into two halves: the Mohnyin-controlled west of the Irrawaddy (present-day Sagaing Region and southern Kachin State), and Hsipaw/Onbaung-controlled eastern half (approximately, northern Mandalay Region and western Shan State).

Unable to fight two wars, Narapati III sued for peace with Toungoo, agreeing to cede all of Central Burma. He was merely acknowledging the facts on the ground. His offer was accepted by King Tabinshwehti of Toungoo. He then tried to persuade Sithu Kyawhtin to come over to his side. But Sithu Kyawhtin was loyal to his overlord Sawlon II of Mohnyin, and both were not interested in a truce. They believed that the Ava throne rightfully belonged to Mohnyin since it was Sawlon I of Mohnyin who led the Confederation to conquer Ava in 1527. Furthermore, they found it jarring that Narapati III belonged to the House of Hsipaw which bitterly fought against Mohnyin in the 1520s. Failing at diplomacy, Narapati attacked Sagaing but could not take it.

An uneasy stalemate ensued in the next five years. Narapati was an average ruler but his cross river rival Sithu Kyawhtin proved to be an able ruler, who increasingly commanded more manpower. Indeed, by 1549, Sithu Kyawhtin had been acknowledged as an equal by Sawlon II, his former overlord. Narapati had no answers when Sithu Kyawhtin attacked Ava in September 1551. He resisted for about a month but fled south to Pegu where he was given protection by King Bayinnaung.

== Aftermath ==
He lived out his life in Pegu. One of his daughters, Khin Aung Kham, was a minor queen of Bayinnaung. He was one of four former kings (along with Sithu Kyawhtin of Ava, Mekuti of Lan Na and Maha Chakkraphat of Siam) honored by Bayinnaung at the opening ceremony of the newly rebuilt Kanbawzathadi Palace on 16 March 1568.

== Bibliography ==
- Kala, U (1724). Maha Yazawin (in Burmese). Vol. 1–3 (2006, 4th printing ed.). Yangon: Ya-Pyei Publishing.
- Phayre, Lt. Gen. Sir Arthur P. (1883). History of Burma (1967 ed.). London: Susil Gupta.
- Royal Historians of Burma (c. 1680). U Hla Tin (Hla Thamein) (ed.). Zatadawbon Yazawin (1960 ed.). Historical Research Directorate of the Union of Burma.
- Royal Historical Commission of Burma (1832). Hmannan Yazawin (in Burmese). Vol. 1–3 (2003 ed.). Yangon: Ministry of Information, Myanmar.
- Sein Lwin Lay, Kahtika U (1968). Mintaya Shwe Hti and Bayinnaung: Ketumadi Taungoo Yazawin (in Burmese) (2006, 2nd printing ed.). Yangon: Yan Aung Sarpay.

Mobye Narapati Ava Kingdom Born: May 1516 Died: ?
Regnal titles
Preceded by Hkonmaing	King of Ava c. September 1545 – c. November 1551	Succeeded by Sithu Kyawhtin
Royal titles
Preceded by	Saopha of Mobye ? – c. September 1545	Succeeded by
