= Chiefdom of Mengmao =

Asian state

Chiefdom of Mengmao ᥛᥫᥒᥰ ᥛᥣᥝᥰ 勐卯土司
- 1611–1955
- Territory in modern Yunnan
- Status: Native Chiefdom of China
- Capital: Ruili
- Common languages: Tai Nuea language
- Government: Monarchy
- Tusi
  - 1611–1646: Kan Zhong (first)
  - 1929–1955: Kan Jingtai (last)
- History
  - Established: 1611
  - Disestablished: 1955
Succeeded by
People's Republic of China
- Today part of: China

The Chiefdom of Mengmao, officially Mengmao Anfusi (猛卯安撫司), was a Dai autonomous Tusi chiefdom in the west of Yunnan, China, from 1611 to 1955.

== History ==
Si Hua (思化), a chief of Mongmit chiefdom, contributed to the Ming-Burmese War. Then Ming dynasty canonized him to be the Tongzhi (同知, vice magistrate) of Mongmit Xuanfusi. Because Si Hua occupied the area of Manmo (Bhamo), his title is also called Manmo Xuanfu Tongzhi (蠻莫宣撫同知). His eldest son Si Zheng (思正) succeed to his position after he died. But Si Zheng was killed by Ming official in 1602. Because Burmese send 100,000 troops to attack him, and he fled to Tengchong, Burmese also chased to Tengchong. Ming officials were worried about the safety of the city, they have to kill him and handed over the corpse to Burma to quell anger.

Ming occupied Manmo in 1605 again and set Kan Zhong (衎忠), the second son of Si Hua, to manage the area. But Kan Zhong was defeated by the Burmese power soon after, he fled to Ganya (Yingjiang). Yunnan governor Zhou Jiamo (周嘉謨) suggested to settle him in Mengmao (Ruili). Ming central government agreed with this suggestion in 1611. After Qing dynasty controlled Yunnan, Manmo Xuanfu Tongzhi renamed Mengmao Anfusi in 1659 officially.

In Republic of China period, the central government used many of method try to abolish chiefdom system, for example, established a direct control government "Ruili Administrate Bureau" (瑞麗設治局). But chiefdom of Mengmao allied with other chiefdoms to resist the abolishment. At its worst, chiefdoms had a consideration for independent from China. Finally, the central government compromised with chiefdoms.

After People's Republic of China controlled this area, the central government launched the Chinese Land Reform Movement. Chiefdom of Mengmao lost his power and land, finally abolished in 1955.
