= Thihathura II of Ava =

Thihathura II of Ava ဒုတိယ သီဟသူရ (အင်းဝ)

King of Ava
- Reign: 1485 – 4 March 1501
- Predecessor: Minkhaung II
- Successor: Minkhaung II
- Born: c. February 1474; Friday, (Pyatho–Tabaung) 835 ME (Note: Based on chronicle reporting, he was born sometime between Friday, 4th waning of Pyatho 835 ME (7 January 1474) and Friday, 1st waning of Tabaung 835 ME (4 March 1474). Per Hmannan Yazawin (Hmannan Vol. 2 2003: 119) he died on 1st waning of Tabaung 862 ME (4 March 1501). It means he was born on or before 1st waning of Tabaung 835 ME (4 March 1474). Moreover, per (Hmannan Vol. 2 2003: 115), he was made co-king in 847 ME (29 Mar 1485 to 28 Mar 1486) at age 11 (in his 12th year). It means he was born in 1474. Since he was born on a Friday, he was born between the first Friday of 1474 (7 January 1474) and the last Friday in the range (4 March 1474).); Ava
- Died: 4 March 1501 (aged 27); Thursday, 1st waning of Tabaung 862 ME; Ava
- Consort: Elder daughter of Theinkhathu of Salin
- Issue: Shwe Nawrahta
- House: Mohnyin
- Father: Minkhaung II
- Mother: Atula Thiri Dhamma Dewi
- Religion: Theravada Buddhism

Thihathura II of Ava (Burmese: ဒုတိယ သီဟသူရ (အင်းဝ); February 1474 – 4 March 1501) was the joint-king of Ava who co-reigned with his father Minkhaung II for 15 years. When he was just six, his father ascended to the Ava throne and he was made heir-apparent. In 1485, the 11-year-old was made a co-regent. (Note: (Hmannan Vol. 2 2003: 115): He was in his 12th year, meaning 11 years old in Western counting.) He lived in the same palace with his father, and displayed a white umbrella as a symbol of sovereignty. He co-ruled with his father for 15 years but died a month earlier than his father. Minkhaung, who faced numerous rebellions throughout his reign, made his son joint-king because he wanted to retain loyalty of his son. Minkhaung outlived his son, died in March 1501 and was succeeded by his younger son Shwenankyawshin (Narapati II).

== Bibliography ==
- Harvey, G. E. (1925). History of Burma: From the Earliest Times to 10 March 1824. London: Frank Cass & Co. Ltd.
- Phayre, Lt. Gen. Sir Arthur P. (1883). History of Burma (1967 ed.). London: Susil Gupta.
- Royal Historical Commission of Burma (1832). Hmannan Yazawin (in Burmese). Vol. 1–3 (2003 ed.). Yangon: Ministry of Information, Myanmar.

Thihathura II of Ava Ava Kingdom Born: c. February 1474 Died: 4 March 1501
Regnal titles
Preceded by Minkhaung II	King of Ava; 1485 – 4 March 1501	Succeeded by Minkhaung II
Royal titles
Preceded by Minkhaung II	Heir to the Burmese Throne; 1480–1485	Succeeded by Narapati II
