= Hkonmaing =

Hkonmaing ခုံမှိုင်း ၶုၼ်မိူင်း

King of Ava
- Reign: c. June 1542 – c. September 1545
- Predecessor: Thohanbwa
- Successor: Mobye Narapati
- Prime Minister: Yan Naung (1542–43)
- Born: August 1497; Tuesday, Wagaung 859 ME (Note: (Zata 1960: 47) has entries for Hkonmaing and his son Mobye Narapati flipped since the son fell from power at age 43, four years after his father had died at age 36!)
- Died: c. September 1545 (aged 48); 907 ME; Ava (Inwa)
- Issue: Mobye Narapati
- House: Hsipaw
- Father: Hkonmaing I of Onbaung–Hsipaw
- Religion: Theravada Buddhism

Hkonmaing (Burmese: ခုံမှိုင်း [kʰòʊɰ̃ m̥áɪɰ̃], Shan: ၶုၼ်မိူင်း; also Hkonmaing Nge, Sao Hkun Mong; 1497–1545) was king of Ava from 1542 to 1545. The saopha of the Shan state of Onbaung–Hsipaw was elected by the Ava court to the Ava throne in 1542, by extension the leader of the Confederation of Shan States, despite strenuous objections by the House of Mohnyin. He was accepted as the leader by other Confederation leaders only because the Confederation was in the middle of a serious war with Toungoo Dynasty. After the Confederation's failed military campaigns in 1543–45 that resulted in the loss of Central Burma, Hkonmaing lost the support of Sawlon II of Mohnyin. He died in 1545 while fighting a Mohnyin-backed rebellion by Sithu Kyawhtin.

== Background ==
Born in 1497, the future king was the eldest son of Hkonmaing I, the longtime ruler of Onbaung–Hsipaw. His father was the only ally of King Narapati II of Ava between 1505 and 1527 when they unsuccessfully fought against Sawlon I of Mohnyin. His father later joined the Confederation, and died during or shortly after his participation in the Confederation's 1542 campaign against Toungoo Dynasty. (Note: (Maha Yazawin Vol. 2 2006: 120): Hkonmaing the elder was already dead in Kason 904 ME (15 April 1542 to 14 May 1542) when the Ava court offered the throne to his son, Hkonmaing the younger.) Hkonmaing the younger succeeded the Onbaung throne.

== King of Ava ==
=== Accession ===
Shortly after he became saopha, the Ava court came calling. King Thohanbwa, who was deeply unpopular with his subjects even before his military defeats against Toungoo Dynasty, had been assassinated in May 1542 (Kason 904 ME). (Note: (Maha Yazawin Vol. 2 2006: 120): Kason 904 ME = 15 April to 14 May 1542.) The court elected Hkonmaing king in June 1542 (Note: (Maha Yazawin Vol. 2 2006: 121): Waso 904 ME = 13 June to 11 July 1542) after the leader of the court insurrection, Yan Naung, rejected the offer. Yan Naung agreed to remain in office and advise the new king for one year. The House of Mohnyin was furious. Not only did they believe the Ava throne rightfully belonged to them but they were also appalled by Thohanbwa's assassin Yan Naung remaining in office. Nevertheless, Sawlon II of Mohnyin relented since the Confederation was in the middle of a serious war with Toungoo. The Confederation leadership reluctantly accepted Hkonmaing as king of Ava in August/September 1542, (Note: (Maha Yazawin Vol. 2 2003: 121): Tawthalin 904 ME = 11 August 1542 to 9 September 1542) and agreed to continue the war.

=== War with Toungoo ===
Hkonmaing prepared for war in the next 12 months. All seven Confederation states (Ava, Mohnyin, Momeik, Hsenwi, Bhamo, Hsipaw and Yawnghwe) had agreed to contribute manpower and materiel. He was not able to persuade King Min Bin of Arakan to stay in the alliance however. In December 1543, he personally led the Confederation's armies and navies, and invaded Lower Burma. After initial successes, they were decisively driven back by February 1544. They could not stop advancing Toungoo forces which took all the way up to Pagan (Bagan).

It was a complete disaster for Hkonmaing. He had not only failed to retake Prome but also managed to lose all of central Burma. The Confederation leadership was unsure how to respond. They sent a small army led by Sithu Kyawhtin as a probe in late 1544, which was subsequently destroyed at Salin.

=== War with Mohnyin ===
By then, Sawlon II's patience had run out. He sent Sithu Kyawhtin with an army of 5,000 to take Ava. Sithu Kyawhtin easily took Sagaing, and attacked Ava (Inwa). The arrival of the rainy season of 1545 saved the day for Hkonmaing. But his territory was now badly splintered: the Mohnyin-controlled west of the Irrawaddy (present-day Sagaing Region and southern Kachin State), and Hsipaw/Onbaung-controlled eastern half (approximately, northern Mandalay Region and western Shan State). He died during the rainy season c. September 1545. He was 48.

== Bibliography ==
- Aung Tun, Sai (2009). History of the Shan State: From Its Origins to 1962. Chiang Mai: Silk Worm Books. ISBN 978-974-9511-43-5.
- Harvey, G. E. (1925). History of Burma: From the Earliest Times to 10 March 1824. London: Frank Cass & Co. Ltd.
- Lieberman, Victor B. (2003). Strange Parallels: Southeast Asia in Global Context, c. 800–1830, volume 1, Integration on the Mainland. Cambridge University Press. ISBN 978-0-521-80496-7.
- Kala, U (1724). Maha Yazawin (in Burmese). Vol. 1–3 (2006, 4th printing ed.). Yangon: Ya-Pyei Publishing.
- Royal Historians of Burma (c. 1680). U Hla Tin (Hla Thamein) (ed.). Zatadawbon Yazawin (1960 ed.). Historical Research Directorate of the Union of Burma.
- Royal Historical Commission of Burma (1832). Hmannan Yazawin (in Burmese). Vol. 1–3 (2003 ed.). Yangon: Ministry of Information, Myanmar.

Hkonmaing Ava Kingdom Born: August 1497 Died: c. September 1545
Regnal titles
| Preceded by Thohanbwa | King of Ava; June 1542 – c. September 1545 | Succeeded by Mobye Narapati |
Royal titles
| Preceded by Hkonmaing I | Saopha of Onbaung–Hsipaw c. May – June 1542 | Succeeded by |
