= Sawlon =

Sawlon of Mohnyin မိုးညှင်းစလုံ

Saopha of Möng Yang
- Reign: 1500s – 1533
- Predecessor: Sawlon the elder (Note: According to (Fernquest 2006: 36) Sawlon became saopha of Mohnyin c. 1482 and died in 1532, meaning he ruled for 50 years. Zatadawbon Yazawin (Zata 1960: 47) says Sawlon was born only in 1486. It means the Sawlon who came to power in 1482 was likely Sawlon's father.)
- Successor: Thohanbwa
- Born: 2 April 1486; Sunday, 13th waning of Tagu 848 ME; Mohnyin
- Died: c. January 1533 (aged 46); Myedu
- Issue: Thohanbwa; Sawlon II
- House: Möng Mao
- Religion: Buddhism

Sawlon of Mohnyin (Burmese: မိုးညှင်းစလုံ [móɲ̥ɪ́ɰ̃ səlòʊɰ̃]; 1486–1533), Tai name Hso Lung Hpa, was saopha of the Shan state of Mohnyin in the early the 16th century. He is best remembered in Burmese history as the conqueror of Ava Kingdom.

Sawlon led a confederation of Shan states, and raided Avan territory throughout the first quarter of the 16th century. (The earliest reported date in the Burmese chronicles of a raid led by Sawlon of Mohnyin came in 1502. It is unclear if the Sawlon in 1502 was this Sawlon who would have been only 16 years old, then. The Sawlon in 1502 may have been Sawlon's father.)

By the 1520s, his confederation included Shan states of Kale (Kalay), Möng Mit, Bhamo as well as the Burman Kingdom of Prome (Pyay). The allies accelerated their concerted attacks on Ava from all directions, and sacked Ava in 1524. But King Shwenankyawshin of Ava and his ally Hkonmaing I of Onbaung–Hsipaw continued their resistance. In 1527, his forces again laid siege to Ava where Shwenankyawshin fell in battle. Sawlon placed his son Thohanbwa on the Ava throne, ending Ava's 163-year reign of Upper Burma. Ava became just another Shan state, and many Burmans fled to Toungoo.

Sawlon made a fateful choice of not attacking the Toungoo Kingdom to the southeast of Ava. Instead, he chose to attack his erstwhile ally Prome for he was unsatisfied with the assistance he received from his ally, King Thado Minsaw of Prome, in their war against Ava. In late 1532, Sawlon and Thohanbwa marched south and captured Prome. After the conquest of Prome, Sawlon was murdered by his own ministers on his way back home to Mohnyin.

== Bibliography ==
- Fernquest, Jon (Autumn 2006). "Crucible of War: Burma and the Ming in the Tai Frontier Zone (1382–1454)" (PDF). SOAS Bulletin of Burma Research. 4 (2). Archived from the original (PDF) on 2019-04-15.
- Fernquest, Jon (Autumn 2005). "Min-gyi-nyo, the Shan Invasions of Ava (1524–27), and the Beginnings of Expansionary Warfare in Toungoo Burma: 1486–1539" (PDF). SOAS Bulletin of Burma Research. 3 (2). Archived from the original (PDF) on 2021-01-27.
- Kala, U (1724). Maha Yazawin (in Burmese). Vol. 1–3 (2006, 4th printing ed.). Yangon: Ya-Pyei Publishing.
- Royal Historians of Burma (c. 1680). U Hla Tin (Hla Thamein) (ed.). Zatadawbon Yazawin (1960 ed.). Historical Research Directorate of the Union of Burma.

Sawlon Mohnyin Born: 2 April 1486 Died: c. January 1533
Royal titles
Preceded by Sawlon the elder	Saopha of Mohnyin ? – 1533	Succeeded by Thohanbwa
