= Man Maw State =

Former Shan state in Burma

Coordinates: 24°33′N 97°7′E

Man Maw မၢၼ်ႈမူဝ်ႇ
- c. 1470–1772
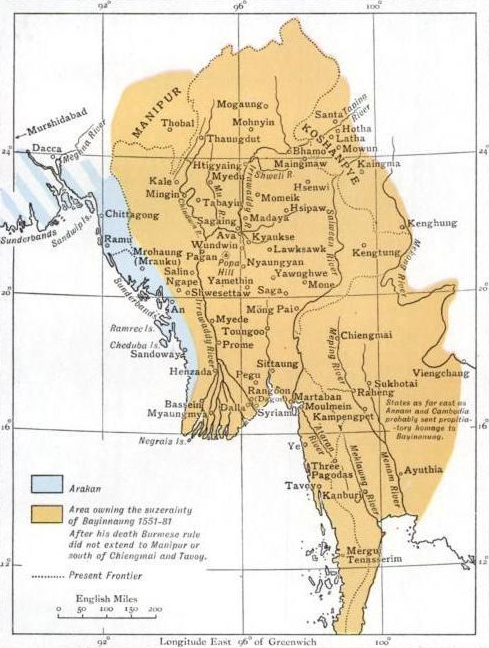
- Man Maw (Bhamo) in a map of the Toungoo Kingdom
- Status: District of Möng Mit (1202–1470)
- Capital: Bhamo
- History
  - Established: c. 1470
  - Annexed by the Kingdom of Burma: 1772
Preceded by	Succeeded by
Möng Mit	Konbaung dynasty
- Today part of: Bhamo District, Myanmar

Man Maw, also known as Wanmaw or Bhamo, was a Shan state in what is today Burma. It was an outlying territory, located away from the main Shan State area in present-day Kachin State close to the border with China. The state existed until 1772. The main town was Man Maw (Bhamo). The name of the state means 'the village of pots (or potters)' in the Shan language.

== History ==
The early history of the state is obscure. But legends tell of a powerful predecessor Tai state having been established in the area previously which had its capital at the now ruined place of Sampenago. The ruins of the old city walls, dating from the fifth Century, are found some 5 km from the modern town of Bhamo. The ancient capital of Sampenago was renowned for its stupas housing relics of the Buddha.

... The Burmese Buddhists know little of Kanishka, but the name of Dhammathawka is well known, and tradition credits him with the foundation of many pagodas with the bones and relics of the Buddha. ... There are many of these shwemōkthos and shwemōkdaws in the Upper Province, and even farther off still, in the tributary Shan States : at Kyaukse, Sampenago, in the Bhamo District; at Pwela in the Myelat, round the Inle lake, and in many parts of the hills. They are all implicitly credited to Dhammathawka...

According to a local chronicle, Man Maw was governed by ministers sent from Möng Mit from 1202 until 1470, when it was granted to a son of the Möng Mit saopha. While this account may be unreliable, a 17th century Chinese record agrees that it had originally belonged to Möng Mit until its chief grew stronger and became an autonomous power. Another Chinese record from 1505 relates that it, along with Möng Mit, had originally belonged to Hsenwi.

From the 1470s, Man Maw was a point of contention between multiple neighbouring powers such as Möng Yang, Möng Mit, Hsenwi, Ava, and Möng Wan, due its large profits from trade as a major emporium between Burma and China.

In 1668 a saopha of Man Maw named Sao Ngawk Hpa is said to have instigated an attack by the Chinese against the Kingdom of Burma. Manmaw was subsequently occupied by Burma between 1669 and 1685 and again in mid 18th century. After regaining independence in 1742 it was again occupied by Burma from 1767 to 1770 after a Chinese invasion was repelled. Finally Manmaw was annexed by the Burmese Ava Kingdom in 1772. The control of this frontier state by the Burmese Kingdom was loose and at the time of the beginning of British rule in Burma the wun in charge of the administration of the territory was de facto quite independent.

=== Rulers ===
The rulers of the state bore the title Saopha. Myowuns or wuns were the administrators of the territory of the former state after annexation by Burma.

==== Saophas ====
This state existed 1470-1772, when it was incorporated into Burma.

Saophas:

- Hso Len Hpa 1470-1482
- Hso Heng Hpa 1482-1485
- Hso Hang Hpa 1485-1507
- Hso Hsao Hpa 1507-1518
- Hso Tiaw Hpa 1518-1543
- Hso Sawk Hpa 1543-1582
- Hso Hkwa Hpa (Hso Yung Hpa) 1582-1588
- Hso Hseng Hpa (Hso Kyaung Hpa) 1588-1603
- Hseng Lung Hpa 1603-1634
- Sao San Hpa 1634-1646
- Sao Law San 1646-1647
- Sao Lin Hpa 1647-1653
- Sao Hsawk Hpa 1653-1668
- Sao Ngawk Hpa 1668-1669
- Min Gon burmese general 1669-1674
- Nge Myat burmese merchant 1674-1685
- Sao Hpi Hpa 1685-1706
- Sao Tun Hpa 1706-1719
- Hpo U 1719-1720
- Sao Möng Hpa 1720-1727
- Sao Tung Ngai 1st time 1727-1735
- Haw Kit 1735-1742
- Sao Tung Ngai 2nd time 1742-1768
- Vacant 1768-1770
- Sao Myat Aung 1770-1772 (b.1690-c.1772) son of saopha of Mongmit

Myowuns:

- 1772-17??: Mingyi Wailuthaya (U Shwe Ye)
- 1853-18??: Mingyi Maha Minhtin Yaza
- 1878-18??: U Pho Hla
