= Möng Pai =

Former Shan state in Burma

Coordinates: 19.2500°N 97.3333°E

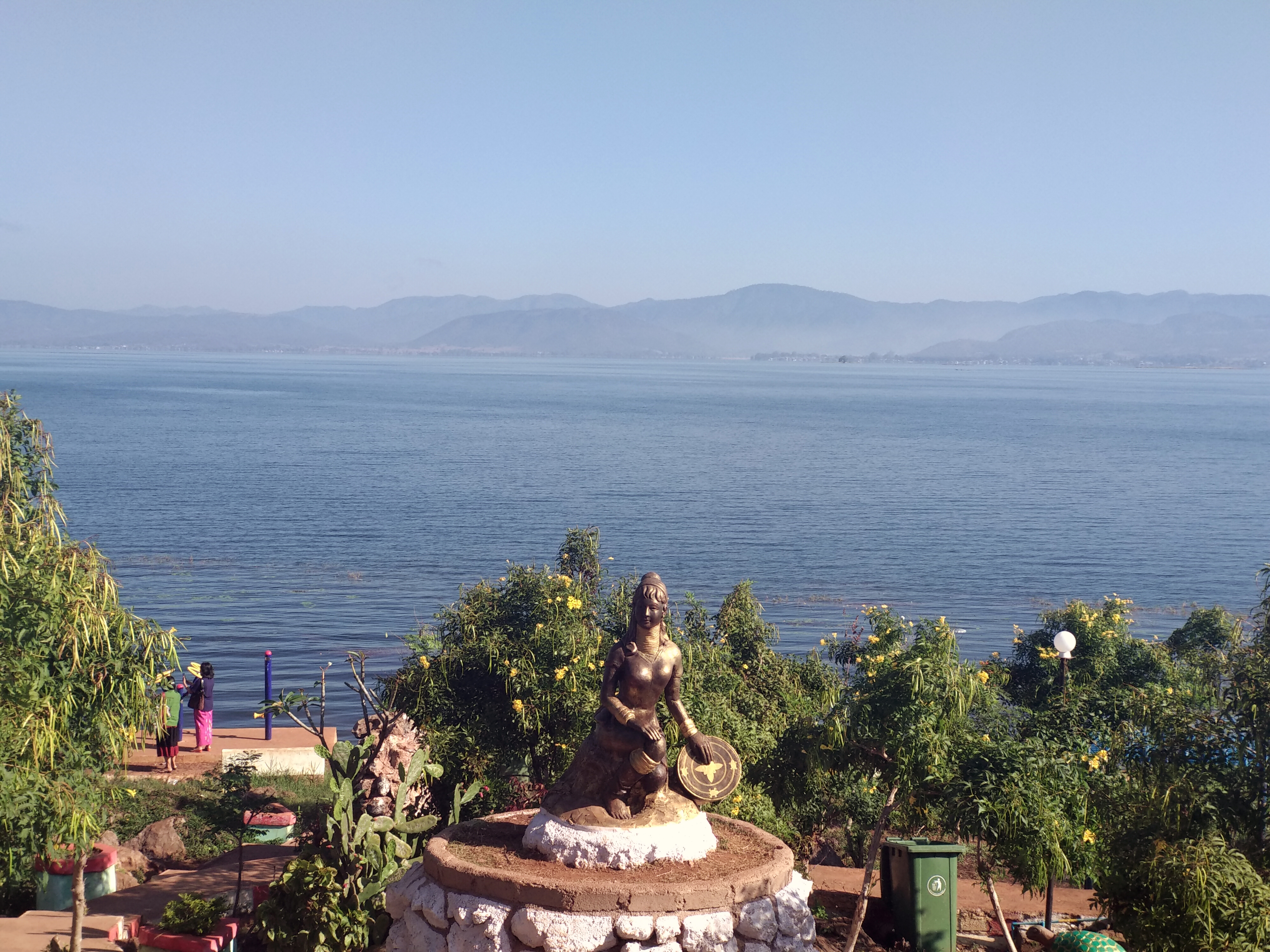
Moe Bye Reservoir

Möng Pai, also known as Mobye (Burmese: မိုးဗြဲ), was a Shan state in what is today Burma. It belonged to the Central Division of the Southern Shan States. Möng Pai was based in the modern town of Mobye.

== History ==
One of Möng Pai's rulers, Sao Hsö Kaw Hpa, became the disputed leader of the Confederation of Shan states and ruled Ava from 1545 to 1551. Hsö Kaw Hpa was appointed as the chief of Möng Pai by Hkonmaing, his father and saopha of Onbaung-Hsipaw.

== Saophas ==
- 1434 - 1449 Bot Hsang Hom Hkam
- 1449 - 1472 Hsan Meik Hpa Hom (son)
- 1472 - 1510 Hso Nyen Hpa a.k.a. Nawn Ging Hpa (son)
- 1510 - 1526 Hso Kyaung Hpa (son)

1526 - 1541 Vacant

- 1541 - 1546 Hso Kaw Hpa (son of Sao Hkun Möng of Hsipaw State)
- 1546 - 1581 Hkam Kaw Hpa (son)
- 1581 - 1615 Maw Kya (bro)
- 1615 - 1639 Nan Pè (Hseng Hsawng Möng),(son)
- 1639 - 1661 Loi Sam Hpa (son)
- 1661 - 1679 Hkam Kyawt Hpa (son)
- 1679 - 1682 Hkam Htat Hpa (son) fled to Siam with his younger brother Nga Hseng, Nga Si, Nga San
- 1685 - 1692 Nga Sawng from Mong Yin (bro)
- 1692 - 1759 Vacant
- 1759 - 1763 Nga The Mang (bro)
- 1763 - 1766 Hkun Pye (son of Sao Naw Hseng, the ancient line from Bot Hsang Hom Hkam) 1st time
- 1766 - 17.. Ye Kyaw Dewa (1st time) from Lawk Sawk
- 17.. - 1783 Sao Dwant Wad from Thigyit
- 1783 - 1803 Ye Kyaw Dewa (2nd time)
- 1803 - 1805 Hkun Pya 2nd time
- 1805 - 1808 Hkan Mawng
- 1808 - 1820 Hkan Hlaing or Hkun Hkam Long (1st time) (d. 1836)
- 1820 - 1823 Atwinwun Nga Kyi (Burmese soldier, Regent)
- 1823 - Jul 1836 Hkan Hlaing or Hkun Hkam Long (2nd time)
- Sep 1837 - 1843 Hkun Yon (son),(b. 18.. - d. 1900) he has three brother Hkun Pan and Hkun Hmôm and Hkan Hlaing, Hkun Hkan Ne, Nge Ye Kyaw who objected him as Sawbwa assassinated by Nga Tôk and Nga Tun
- 1843 - 1844 Hkun Sôn Myook (moved to be saopha of Mong Hkawng in one place of Karen State after one year he assassinated)
- 1844 - 1891 Hkun Yon 2nd time
- 1891 - 30 Dec 1907 Hkun Hsuriya (b. 1852 - d. 1907) handed with his cousin Hkun Lôn Myook

30 Dec 1907 - 26 May 1908 Vacant

- 26 May 1908 - 1952/59 Hkun Ping Nya (b. 1881 - d. 19..)

== Sources ==
- Ben Cahoon (2000). "World Statesmen.org: Shan and Karenni States of Burma".
- "WHKMLA : History of the Shan States". 18 May 2010.
