= Shan States =

Historical states inhabited by the Shan people

- Independent or under Burmese and Chinese suzerainty (before 1885); Princely states of British Raj (1885–1922); Part of Federated Shan States (1922–1948); Part of Shan State (1948–1959)
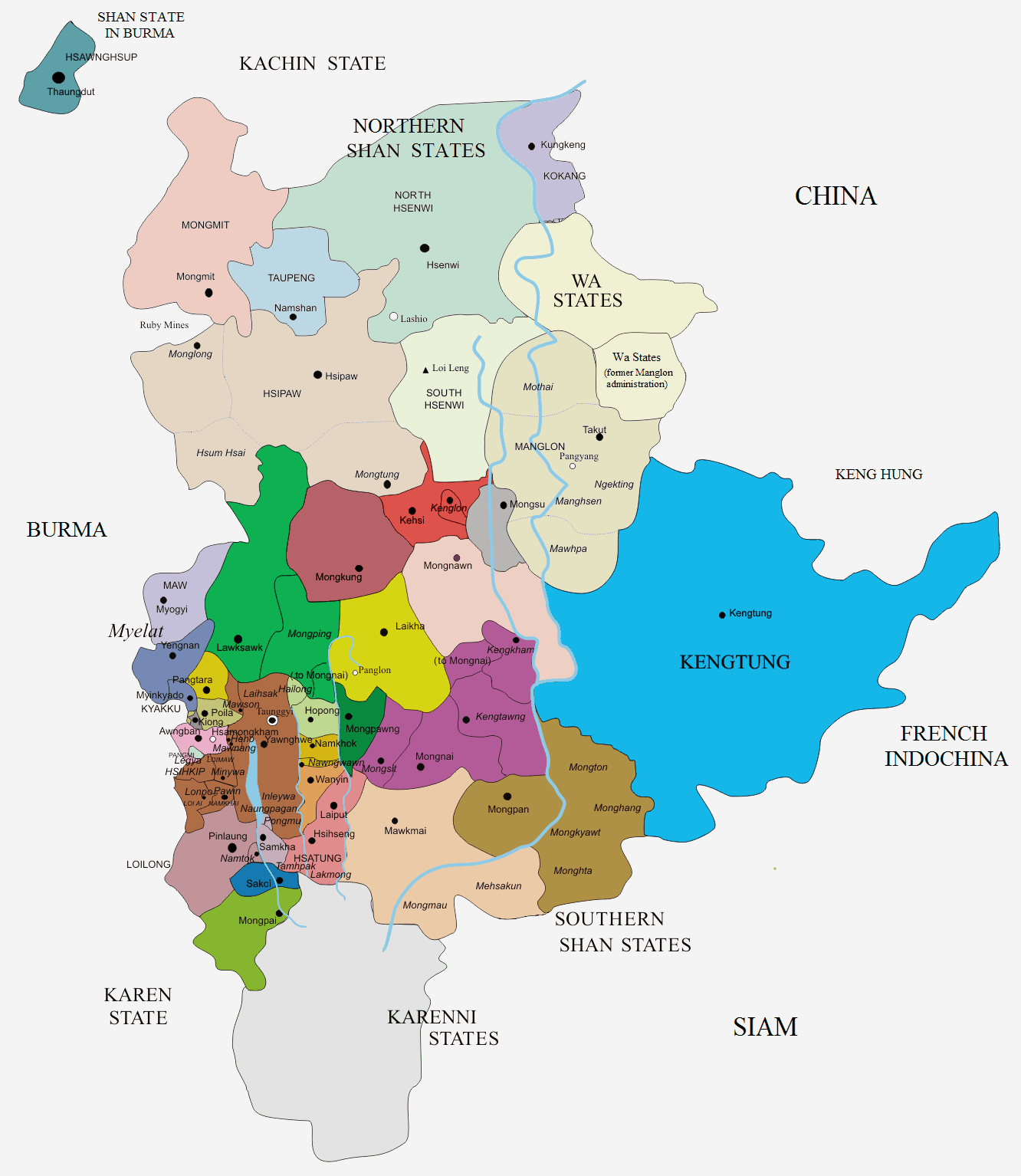
- Map of the Shan States, c. 1900.
- Capital: Taunggyi
- Government
  - Type: Monarchy
- History
  - Independence from Pagan and Dali kingdoms: 13th century
  - Si Kefa becomes ruler of Möng Mao: c. 1335
  - Destruction of Sagaing and Pinya: 1364
  - Shan rule of Upper Burma: 1527–1555
  - Subjugation by the Taungoo dynasty: 1557
  - Establishment of British Protectorates: 19th century
  - Fully annexed into Burma: 1959
Preceded by	Succeeded by
Pagan Kingdom; Dali Kingdom	Federated Shan States
- Today part of: Myanmar

The Shan States were a collection of Shan (Tai) principalities called möng whose rulers bore the title saopha (sawbwa). The term "Shan States" was first used during the British rule in Burma as a geopolitical designation for certain autonomous areas of Burma, analogous to the princely states of British India. The terms "Siamese Shan States" and "Chinese Shan States" were also used to refer to the Tai principalities in northern Thailand and southern Yunnan, which instead came under the suzerainty of the Kingdom of Siam or Qing dynasty.

Historical mention of the Shan states inside the present-day boundaries of Burma began during the period of the Pagan dynasty; according to the Tai chronicles, the first major Shan State of that era was founded in 1215 at Möng Kawng, followed by Möng Nai in 1223. These were part of the larger Tai migration that founded the Ahom Kingdom in 1229 and the Sukhothai Kingdom in 1253. Shan political power increased after the Mongols overran Pagan in 1287 and the Shans came to dominate many of the northern to eastern areas of Burma—from northwestern Sagaing Division to the present-day Shan Hills. The newly founded Shan States were multi-ethnic states that included a substantial number of other ethnic minorities such as the Chin, Palaung, Lisu, Pa-O, Kachin, Wa, and Burmans.

The Shan States were a dominant force in the politics of Upper Burma throughout the 13th to 16th centuries. The strongest Shan States, Möng Mao, Möng Yang and Hsenwi, constantly raided Upper Burma. Möng Mao ended the kingdoms of Sagaing and Pinya in 1364. However, the Shan States were too fragmented to resist the encroachment of bigger neighbours. In the north, the Chinese Ming dynasty conquered today's Yunnan in the 1380s, stamping out the final Shan resistance by the 1440s.

The rulers of Möng Mao moved to Möng Yang, and in 1527 they led the Confederation of Shan States which captured the Ava Kingdom and ruled Upper Burma until 1555. In the south, the Toungoo dynasty captured all those Shan States that would become known as the Burmese Shan States in 1557. Though the Shan States came under the suzerainty of Burmese kingdoms based in the valley of the Irrawaddy River, the Shan saophas (chiefs) retained a large degree of autonomy.

When Burma gained independence in 1948, the Federated Shan States became Shan State while the southern portion became Kayah State within the Union of Burma with the right to secede from the Union. However, the Shan States and the saophas' hereditary rights were removed by General Ne Win's military government in 1962.

== Historical states ==
Most Shan States were just little principalities organised around the chief town in the region. They played a precarious game of paying allegiance to more powerful states, sometimes simultaneously. Smaller states such as Loi-ai, Möng Hsat and Möng Hsu paid allegiance to more powerful Shan states like Yawnghwe, Kengtung and Hsenwi. The larger Shan States in turn paid tribute to larger neighbours such as the Ava, the Burmese Kingdom and China.

Some of the major Shan States were.

- Hsenwi
- Hsipaw
- Kengcheng
- Kengtung
- Möng Pai
- Möng Kawng (Mogaung)
- Möng Mit
- Möng Pawn
- Möng Nai
- Möng Yang (Mohnyin)
- Yawnghwe
- Man Maw (Bhamo)

== History ==
Early history of the Shan states is clouded in myth. Most states claimed having been founded upon a predecessor state with a Sanskrit name Shen/Sen. Tai Yai chronicles usually begin with the story of two brothers, Khun Lung and Khun Lai, who descended from heaven in the 6th century and landed in Hsenwi, where the local population hailed them as kings.

The Shan people have inhabited the Shan Hills and other parts of northern modern-day Burma as far back as the 10th century AD. According to local accounts, the Shan kingdom of Möng Mao may have existed in Yunnan in the 10th century CE but became a Burmese vassal state during the reign of King Anawrahta of Pagan (1044–1077).

=== Pagan dynasty period ===
The historical relevance of the Shan states inside the present-day boundaries of Burma increased during the period of the Pagan Kingdom in the Shan Hills and Kachin Hills and accelerated after the fall of the Pagan Kingdom to the Yuan dynasty in 1287. The Shans, including a new migration that came down with the Mongols, quickly came to dominate an area from northern Chin State and northwestern Sagaing Region to the present-day Shan Hills. The newly founded Shan States were multi-ethnic states that included a substantial number of other ethnic minorities like the Chin, Palaung, Pa-O, Kachin, Akha, Lahu, Wa and Burmans. The most powerful Shan states were Möng Yang and Möng Kawng in present-day Kachin State, followed by Hsenwi, Hsipaw, Möng Mit and Kengtung in present-day Shan State.

=== Möng Mao ===
Möng Mao during the reign of Si Kefa, c. 1360

Möng Mao arose in the power vacuum left after the Kingdom of Dali in along the modern Myanmar-China border fell to the Mongol Yuan Dynasty around 1254. The Yuan ruled the region indirectly in what was known as the Native Chieftain System. This kingdom had asserted some unity over the diversity of ethnic groups residing along the southwest frontier of Yunnan. Beginning in the 1380s, Möng Mao came into conflict with the Ming dynasty of China, multiple clashes occurred until Möng Mao was finally defeated in 1444. Its territory was split among multiple Shan states, and the royal family moved west of the Irrawaddy to continue their rule in Möng Yang, which would eventually lead the Confederation of Shan States.

=== Confederation of Shan States ===
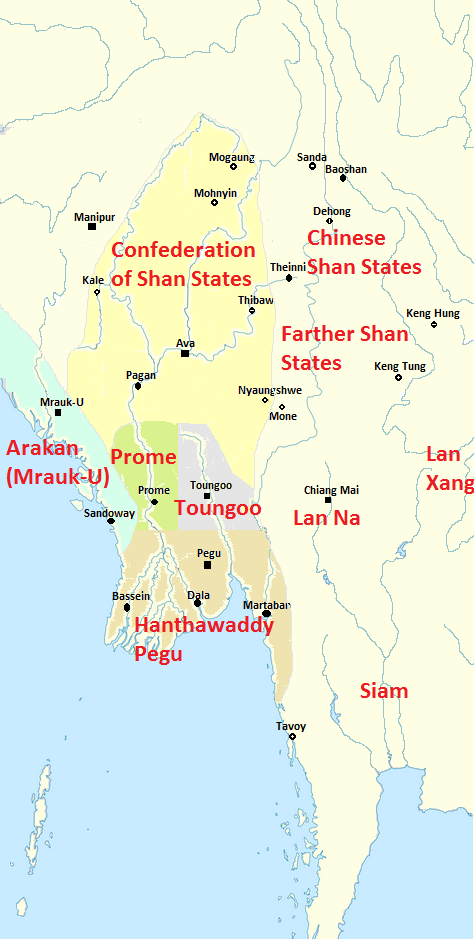
The confederation and neighbouring states in 1530

The Confederation of Shan States were a group of Shan States that conquered the Ava Kingdom in 1527 and ruled Upper Burma until 1555. The Confederation originally consisted of Möng Yang, Möng Kawng, Bhamo, Möng Mit, and Kale. It was led by Sawlon, the chief of Möng Yang, and a descendant of the Möng Mao royal family. The Confederation raided Upper Burma throughout the early 16th century (1502–1527) and fought a series of wars against Ava and its ally Hsipaw. The Confederation finally defeated Ava in 1527, and placed Sawlon's eldest son Thohanbwa on the Ava throne. Hsipaw and its tributaries Yawnghwe and Möng Pai also came over to the confederation.

The enlarged Confederation extended its authority down to Prome (Pyay) in 1533 by defeating their erstwhile ally Prome Kingdom because Sawlon felt that Prome did not provide sufficient help in their war against Ava. After the Prome war, Sawlon was assassinated by his own ministers, creating a leadership vacuum. Although Sawlon's son Thohanbwa naturally tried to assume the leadership of the Confederation, he was never fully acknowledged as the first among equals by other saophas.

An incoherent confederation neglected to intervene in the first four years of Toungoo–Hanthawaddy War (1535–1541) in Lower Burma. They did not appreciate the gravity of the situation until 1539 when Toungoo defeated Hanthawaddy, and turned against its vassal Prome. The saophas finally banded together and sent in a force to relieve Prome in 1539. However, the combined force was unsuccessful in holding Prome against another Toungoo attack in 1542.

In 1543, the Burmese ministers assassinated Thohanbwa and placed Hkonmaing, the saopha of Hsipaw, on the Ava throne. Möng Yang leaders, led by Sithu Kyawhtin, felt that the Ava throne was theirs. But in light of the Toungoo threat, Möng Yang leaders grudgingly agreed to Hkonmaing's leadership. The Confederation launched a major invasion of Lower Burma in 1543 but its forces were driven back. By 1544, Toungoo forces had occupied up to Pagan. The confederation would not attempt another invasion. After Hkonmaing died in 1546, his son Mobye Narapati, the saopha of Möng Pai, became king of Ava. The confederation's bickering resumed in full force. Sithu Kyawhtin set up a rival fiefdom in Sagaing across the river from Ava and finally drove out Mobye Narapati in 1552.

The weakened Confederation proved no match for Bayinnaung's Toungoo forces. Bayinnaung captured Ava in 1555 and conquered all of Shan States in a series of military campaigns from 1556 to 1557.

=== British rule in Burma ===
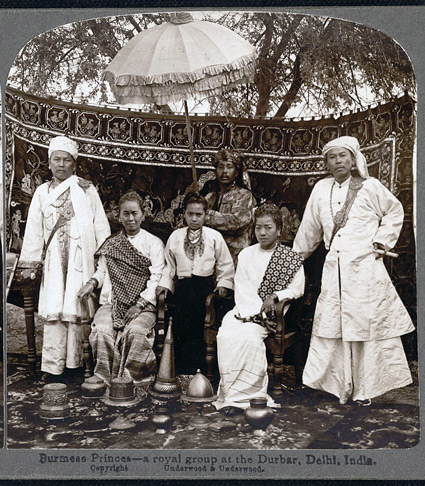
Two Shan saophas with their wives seated between them at the Durbar held in New Delhi in honour of Edward VII.

In 1885, following three wars that steadily added various parts of Burma to their empire, the British finally occupied all of the territory of present-day Myanmar. The area became then a Province of British India.

Under the British colonial administration, the Shan States became nominally sovereign princely states. Although states were ruled by local monarchs, they were subject to a subsidiary alliance under the paramountcy of the British Crown.

Towards the last phase of British rule the Shan and Karenni states were labeled as "Frontier Areas", a broad designation for mountainous areas bordering India, China and Laos where the British government allowed local rule. in 1922 the Shan states were joined together into a Federation, the Federated Shan States. They were administered separately by the Burma Frontier Service by British Assistance Superintendents, later renamed as Assistant Residents.

In 1935 the Frontier Areas were divided into "Excluded Areas" and "Partially Excluded Areas"—also known as "Part I Areas" and "Part II Areas"—through the Second Schedule to the 1935 Government of Burma Act.

== Chinese Shan States ==
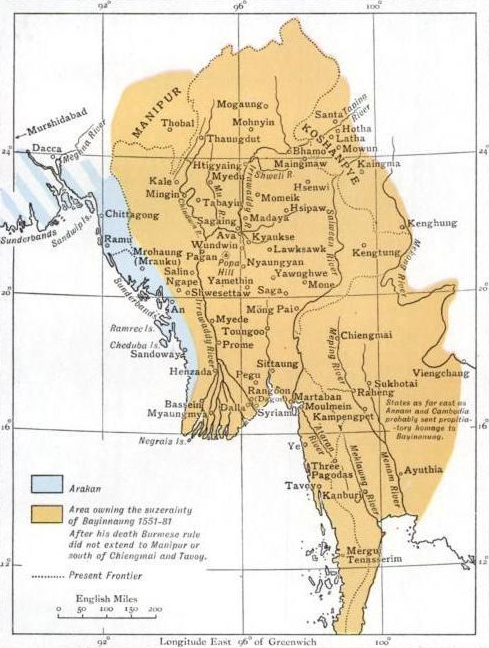
Map of the Toungoo Kingdom with the Koshanpye in the NE.

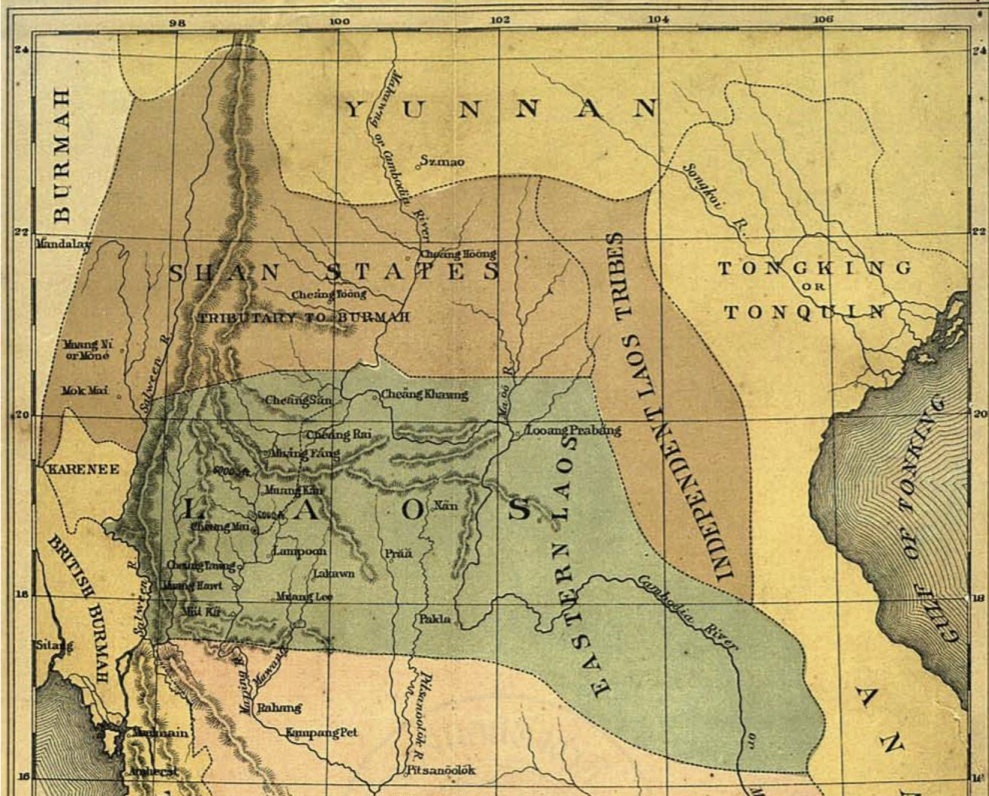
19th century map including the Chinese Shan States.

The Chinese Shan States were petty states or small territories of Shan people ruled by local monarchs under the suzerainty of China. They were also known as Koshanpye or "Nine Shan States". The main states were Möng Lem (Mainglengyi, Maing-ying, Mong Lien), Möngmāu (Möng Mao), Hsikwan (Si-gwin), Möngnā (Ganya), Sandā (Zhanda, Möng Santa), Hosā (Ho Hsa, Hotha), Lasā (Möng Hsa, La Hsa), Möngwan (Möng Wan, Mo-wun), Möngmyen (Möng Myen, Momien, Momein/Tengyue) and Köng-ma (Küngma, Kaing-ma, Kengma, Gengma), among others, in addition to Keng Hung (Chiang Hung).

Most of the history of these petty Tai (Dai) Kingdoms is obscure. Existing chronicles and traditions regarding the northernmost outlying Shan States include conflicting names and dates which have led to different interpretations. According to ancient tradition there was a State of Pong that had its origin in the legendary kingdom of Udiri Pale, founded in 58 BC. The Cheitharol Kumbaba Manipuri Kingdom chronicle—written much later—mentions an alliance between the Kangleipak State and the Kingdom of Pong. This quasi-legendary kingdom is also mentioned among the conquests of Anoratha, the King of Pagan. Some scholars identify the Kingdom of Pong with Möng Mao as well as with the kingdom of Luh Shwan mentioned in Chinese chronicles.

Vassal states to more powerful empires of China, these Shan States gained a measure of independence in the power vacuum left after the Dali Kingdom in Yunnan fell to the Yuan dynasty. By the 17th century the territories of these outlying Shan States had been merged into the core territories of Chinese dynasties, their rulers being allowed to retain a great measure of authority under the Tǔsī Zhìdù (Chinese: 土司制度) system of recognized chieftainship. In mid 18th century, the Konbaung dynasty's armies led a series of wars against the Chinese Qing dynasty following which eight of the Chinese Shan states were briefly occupied by the Kingdom of Burma, but all of these northernmost Shan States remained under Chinese rule after that.

The former Chinese Shan States are now part of Yunnan Province. Under the Chinese administration the status of the Shan people in the Chinese Shan States was reduced when they were labelled as a "minority". Thus they became one more among the other ethnic minorities in that area of present-day Yunnan such as the Lahu and the Va.

== See also ==
- Shan people
- Wa States

== Bibliography ==
- C. Patterson Giersch, Asian Borderlands: The Transformation of Qing China's Yunnan Frontier. Harvard University Press (2006), ISBN 9780674021716
- Aung Tun, Sai (2009). History of the Shan State: From Its Origins to 1962 (Second, illustrated ed.). Chiang Mai, Thailand: Silkworm Books. ISBN 978-9-749-51143-5.
