= Prome kingdom =

State in present-day Myanmar (Burma) from 1482 to 1542

Coordinates: 18°49′N 95°14′E

Prome kingdom ဒုတိယ သရေခေတ္တရာနေပြည်တော်
- 1482–1542
- Status: Kingdom, vassal of Shan states (1532–1542)
- Capital: Prome (Pyay)
- Common languages: Burmese
- Religion: Theravada Buddhism
- Government: Monarchy
  - 1482–1526: Thado Minsaw
  - 1526–1532: Bayin Htwe
  - 1532–1539: Narapati
  - 1539–1542: Minkhaung
- Legislature: None
- History
  - Founding of kingdom: 1482
  - War with Ava: 1524–1525
  - War with Confederation of Shan States: 1532
  - War with Toungoo: 1539–1542
  - Fall of kingdom: 19 May 1542
Preceded by	Succeeded by
Ava kingdom	Toungoo dynasty

The Prome kingdom (Burmese: ဒုတိယ သရေခေတ္တရာ နေပြည်တော်, lit. "Second Sri Ksetra kingdom") also known as Pyay kingdom was a kingdom that existed for six decades between 1482 and 1542 in present-day central Burma (Myanmar). Based out of the city of Prome (Pyay), the minor kingdom was one of the several statelets that broke away from the dominant Ava kingdom in the late 15th century. Throughout the 1520s, Prome was an ally of the Confederation of Shan States, and together they raided Avan territory. After Ava fell to the Confederation armies in 1527, Prome itself became a tributary of the Confederation in 1532. In the late 1530s, Prome became ensnarled in the Toungoo–Hanthawaddy War (1534–1541). Despite military assistance from the Confederation and the Mrauk U kingdom, the small kingdom fell to the Toungoo (Taungoo) forces in 1542.

== History ==
=== Origins ===
For much of the first half of the second millennium, Prome was a vassal state of Upper Burma-based kingdoms–Pagan, Pinya and Ava. During the Ava period (14th–15th centuries), Prome was the southernmost region abutting the rival Hanthawaddy kingdom. The region was a frequent battlefield during the Forty Years' War (1385–1424) between Ava and Hanthawaddy. Avan kings considered the region the most strategic, and appointed only the most senior princes as viceroys of Prome (Pyay). For example, Crown Prince Minye Kyawswa, King Thihathu of Ava and King Narapati of Ava were once governor of Prome.

The Forty Years' War, which ended in a stalemate, left Ava exhausted, and its vassals restless. From the 1420s to the 1480s, each new king of Ava had to put down rebellions. In 1469, Prome's long-time governor, Mingyi Swa (r. 1446–1482) rebelled against his brother, when the latter ascended to the Ava throne as Thihathura. But the new king laid siege on Prome, and Mingyi Swa submitted to his brother. Mingyi Swa was forgiven, and reappointed to his former position.

=== Independence from Ava (1482) ===
Thihathura died in 1480, and Mingyi Swa died in 1482. The new king Minkhaung II faced a multitude of rebellions–the most serious one by his younger brother, Gov. Minye Kyawswa of Yamethin. Unlike the usual unrest in remote regions, the Yamethin rebellion was so close to Ava itself, and was a grave threat to the new king. Taking advantage of the power struggle between his two nephews, the governor of Tharrawaddy, Thado Minsaw, seized Prome and declared himself king.

Thado Minsaw raised his brother Mingyi Swa's chief queen as his chief queen. Minkhaung managed to send an army to reclaim Prome. But the Avan army could not take Prome, and retreated. Ava could not send another force again as the much more serious Yamethin rebellion (and rebellions by the Shan States of Mohnyin and Kale) consumed its resources for the next two decades. Prome became an independent kingdom with territories up to Tharrawaddy and Myede.

Thado Minsaw largely stayed out of the fighting in Upper Burma. He forged a peaceful relationship with Hanthawaddy, the most powerful kingdom in the region.

=== Meddling into Upper Burma (1520s) ===
Thado Minsaw changed his policy in the 1520s when Ava was on its last legs suffering from the sustained assaults by Confederation of Shan States. He entered into a league with Sawlon, the confederation's leader. In March 1525, the combined armies of Confederation and Prome sacked the city of Ava. The king of Ava, Shwenankyawshin, who was Thado Minsaw's grandnephew, escaped. Prome and Confederation forces looted the city. The Prome armies brought back the famed poet monk Shin Maha Rattathara. Prome remained in a league with the Confederation, which continued its attacks on Ava.

Thado Minsaw died in 1526, and was succeeded by his son Bayin Htwe.

=== The end (1526–1542) ===
On 25 March 1527, the Confederation forces captured Ava, and placed Sawlon's eldest son Thohanbwa on the Ava throne. Sawlon was unsatisfied with the level of support he received from Prome, and held a grudge. In 1532, the Confederation forces came down and attacked Prome. Bayin Htwe was taken prisoner back to Upper Burma. The captive king escaped after Sawlon was assassinated by his own ministers. But Bayin Htwe's son Narapati shut the gates against his father. Bayin Htwe died soon after in the adjoining forests.

Narapati remained a nominal vassal to Confederation controlled Ava. Although his authority did not extend beyond the immediate region around Prome, he became ensnarled in the Toungoo–Hanthawaddy War (1534–41). Narapati was an ally of King Takayutpi of Hanthawaddy, and was married to Takayutpi's sister. Narapati provided shelter to the fleeing Hanthawaddy troops in 1539. When Toungoo troops attacked a heavily fortified Prome, Narapati asked for help from the Confederation in Ava. The Confederation troops broke the siege, and refused to follow up on the retreating Toungoo armies.

Narapati formed an alliance with the Mrauk U kingdom of Arakan by sending his sister and his queen (Takayutpi's sister) to King Min Bin of Mrauk U. (Takayutpi had died soon after the battle.) Narapati too died soon after and was succeeded by Minkhaung.

In late 1541, Toungoo again laid siege to Prome. Prome's allies the Confederation and Mrauk U sent in help to break the siege. But Toungoo forces under the command of Gen. Bayinnaung defeated both armies. Mrauk U also sent in a naval flotilla that landed in Bassein (Pathein). Upon hearing of the Mrauk U army's defeat, the flotilla turned back. After a five months' siege, starvation set in. The besieged deserted the city in great numbers. On 19 May 1542 (5th waxing of Nayon 904 ME), Minkhaung surrendered. Minkhaung and his queen Thiri Hponhtut were taken to Toungoo (Taungoo).

== Aftermath ==
King Tabinshwehti of Toungoo appointed Thado Dhamma Yaza I, restoring the city to its former position of a provincial capital. Thado Dhamma Yaza I revolted in May 1550 after Tabinshwehti's death but the revolt was put down in August 1551 by Bayinnaung. The principality was again in revolt between 1594 and 1608, during the collapse of First Toungoo Empire before being re-annexed by King Anaukpetlun in July 1608.

== See also ==
- Sri Ksetra kingdom
- List of rulers of Prome
  - Prome kings family tree
