= Thohanbwa =

King of Ava (1505 - 1542)

Thohanbwa သိုဟန်ဘွား

King of Ava
- Reign: 14 March 1527 – May 1542
- Predecessor: Shwenankyawshin
- Successor: Hkonmaing
- Prime Minister: Yan Naung
- Born: 1505; 867 ME
- Died: May 1542 (aged 36); Ava (Inwa)
- House: Möng Mao
- Father: Sawlon
- Religion: Buddhism

Thohanbwa (Burmese: သိုဟန်ဘွား, pronounced [θòhàɰ̃bwá]; Shan: သိူဝ်ႁၢၼ်ၾႃ့; 1505 – May 1542) was king of Ava from 1527 to 1542. The eldest son of Sawlon of Mohnyin was a commander who actively participated in Mohnyin's numerous raids of Ava's territories in the first quarter of 16th century. In March 1527, the ethnically Shan king was appointed king of Ava by Sawlon after the Mohnyin-led confederation of Shan States defeated Ava in 1527. After Sawlon was assassinated in 1533, Thohanbwa became the undisputed king of Ava as well as chief of Mohnyin. However, he was not immediately accepted by other chiefs as the leader of the confederation.

He is remembered in Burmese history as a "full-blooded savage" who killed learned monks, looted treasures from Buddhist pagodas and burned books. He was hated by his Burman and Shan subjects alike. Yet it was his inaction and inability to mobilize the various Shan states to the threat posed by Toungoo, former vassal state of Ava, that proved most crucial, allowing the upstart kingdom to gain strength and buy time. Toungoo went on to defeat Hanthawaddy kingdom after a five-year war (1534–1539) during which Ava did nothing. Only when Toungoo turned on Prome, Ava's vassal, in 1539 did Thohanbwa and his bickering Shan allies send in help. It was too late. The Confederation troops were driven back by Gen. Bayinnaung of Toungoo in April 1542.

Right after the defeat, the Ava court plotted a coup. In May 1542, Thohanbwa was assassinated by his chief minister Yan Naung.

== Early life ==
Hso Harn Hpa, or Thohanbwa in Burmese, was a son of Sawlon of Mohnyin, who had successfully rebelled against Ava's rule in the 1480s. By the early 16th century, the father-son team of Sawlon and Thohanbwa regularly raided Ava's territories from the north. In the early 1520s, their raids were joined by a confederation of Shan States under the leadership of Mohnyin. The confederation gradually took away Ava's northernmost territories, and sacked Ava in 1524 though the king of Ava, Shwenankyawshin and his main ally Hkonmaing, the saopha of Hsipaw escaped and continued resistance. In 1527, the confederation laid siege to Ava again. In April, Shwenankyawshin was killed in battle and Ava fell. Sawlon appointed Thohanbwa as the "king" of Ava– essentially a viceroy ruling on behalf of his father and the confederation.

== Reign ==
=== Administration ===
Unaccustomed to administer a kingdom as large as Ava, Sawlon and Thohanbwa, lifelong raiders and rulers of petty Shan States, had to retain some of the ministers from the old Ava court. (Many of Ava's ministers, their families, and people in general had fled south to Toungoo to escape persecution by the Shans.) Thohanbwa made Mingyi Yan Naung his chief minister to handle the administration of the kingdom. Instead, the father-son team focused on continuing attacks on its neighbors. In 1533, Sawlon and Thohanbwa attacked their erstwhile ally Prome Kingdom (Pyay) because they perceived that Prome did not give sufficient help during the siege of Ava six years earlier. They succeeded and brought Bayin Htwe, the ruler of Prome, as captive. During the march back to Mohnyin, Sawlon was assassinated by his own ministers.

The death of Sawlon created a leadership vacuum in the Shan confederation. It appears that other saophas did not acknowledge Thohanbwa, as the eldest son of Sawlon, as the first among equals. The confederation did not take any concerted action in the second half of the 1530s when Tabinshwehti of Toungoo was waging war on the southern kingdom of Hanthawaddy Pegu. With Toungoo in an all-out war with Hanthawaddy, the upstart kingdom's northern border with Ava must have been lightly defended. Yet it was not until 1539 after Pegu had fallen to Toungoo that Thohanbwa and his allies took notice.

In 1542, Thohanbwa got his confederation (Mohnyin, Mogaung, Bhamo, Momeik, Hsipaw and Yawnghwe) to march down to defend Prome against Toungoo's attacks. But they were decisively defeated outside Prome by Gen. Bayinnaung of Toungoo, and were forced to retreat, leaving the city to its fate.

=== Religious persecution ===
Thohanbwa is termed "a full blooded savage" by historian GE Harvey. He was hated by the Burmans and Shans alike for his indiscriminate looting, killing and book burning. Thohanbwa said pagodas have nothing to do with religion. They are simply treasure chambers, and proceeded to pillage such as were in reach. When the monks resisted, "they ought to be killed". In 1540, he had 360 monks, including 30 eminent for their learning, from the capital region of Ava, Sagaing and Pinya killed. He proceeded to seize the manuscripts in the monasteries, and made bonfires of them.

=== Assassination ===
After the failed invasion of the south, Thohanbwa had lost all his allies in the Ava court. His chief minister Yan Naung finally decided to organize a putsch at the summer palace outside Ava. When Thohanbwa asked to see his predecessor Shwenankyawshin's famous sword called "Yeinnwepa Dha" (Burmese: ယိမ်းနွဲ့ပါးဓါး), Yan Naung picked out the sword, and bending low as if to present it, went close to the king and smote him so that the sword went through him and out again, severing five bamboos of the dais floor.

Yan Naung was offered the throne but he declined. The ministers then gave the throne to Hkonmaing, the ruler of Hsipaw (Thibaw), who was a steadfast ally of Shwenankyawshin.

Thohanbwa Ava Kingdom Born: 1505 Died: May 1542
Regnal titles
Preceded by Shwenankyawshin	King of Ava; 14 March 1527 – May 1542	Succeeded by Hkonmaing
