= Toungoo–Hanthawaddy War =

16th-century military conflict in Asia

Toungoo–Hanthawaddy War (1534–1541), Toungoo-Hongsarvatoi war
- Part of Wars of Toungoo Empire
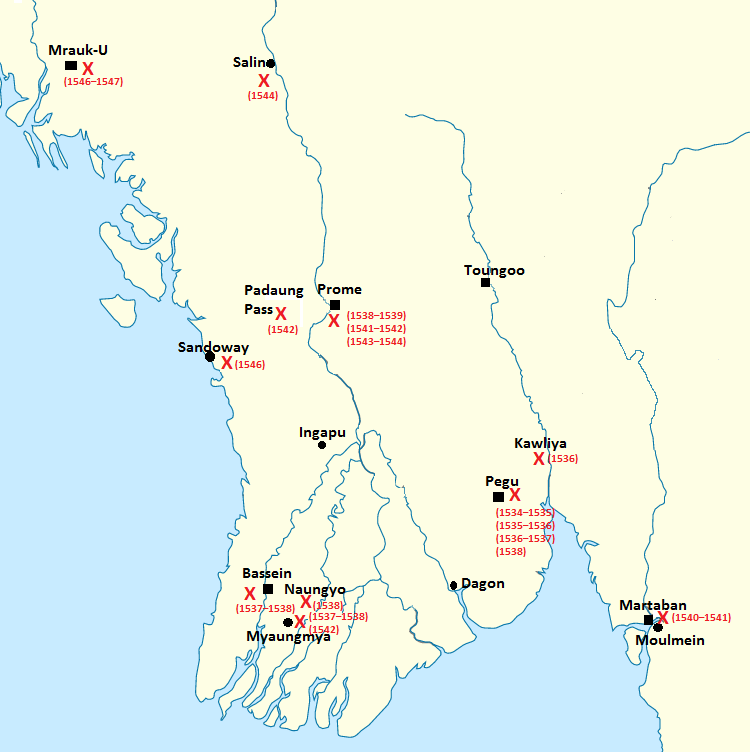
- Toungoo military campaigns (1534–1547)
Date	c. November 1534 – May 1541
Location	Pegu, Irrawaddy delta, Prome, Martaban
Result	Toungoo victory
Territorial changes	Toungoo annexes Hanthawaddy (Lower Burma)

Belligerents
Toungoo Kingdom	Hanthawaddy kingdom Prome Kingdom; Confederation of Shan States

Commanders and leaders
Tabinshwehti; Bayinnaung; Saw Lagun Ein; Smim Payu; João Caeiro	Takayutpi; Binnya Law †; Binnya Kyan †; Saw Binnya †; Narapati of Prome; Minkhaung of Prome; Thohanbwa; Paulo de Seixas

Units involved
Royal Burmese Army including: 700 foreign mercenaries (1539–1541)	Hanthawaddy Army including foreign mercenaries (1534–1539): Armies of Confederation of Shan States and Prome Kingdom (1539); Martaban Army including foreign mercenaries (1540–1541)

Strength
1534–1535 vs. Pegu: 4,000; 1535–1536 vs. Pegu: 6,000; 1536–1537 vs. Pegu: 7,000; 1538–1539 vs. Pegu: 7,000 1540–1541 vs. Martaban: 13,000	1538–1539 (Pegu): 12,000: (80,000 at Battle of Naungyo); 1540–1541 (Martaban): unknown strength; seven Portuguese warships

Casualties and losses
High	Extremely high (most of Martaban's residents killed)

The Toungoo–Hanthawaddy War (1534–1541) (Burmese: တောင်ငူ–ဟံသာဝတီ စစ် (၁၅၃၄–၁၅၄၁)) was a military conflict between the Toungoo Kingdom, and the Hanthawaddy kingdom and its allies the Prome Kingdom and the Confederation of Shan States that took place in present-day Lower Burma (Myanmar) between 1534 and 1541. In a series of improbable events, the upstart Burmese-speaking kingdom defeated the Mon-speaking Hanthawaddy, the most prosperous and powerful of all post-Pagan kingdoms before the war. In the following years, Toungoo used the newly acquired kingdom's wealth and manpower to reunify the various petty states that had existed since the fall of Pagan Empire in 1287.

== Background ==
Since its founding in 1279 as an outpost of the Pagan Kingdom, Toungoo, located in a remote, hard-to-reach corner east of the Pegu Yoma (Bago Yoma) range, had always been a troublesome province for its overlord. During the Ava period, its governors and viceroys raised multiple rebellions (1427–1428, 1437–1442, 1451–1458, and 1468–1470), each time with clandestine or open help from Hanthawaddy, which wanted to keep Ava unstable.

Ironically, Toungoo would repay by attacking Hanthawaddy itself. Circa 1494, Toungoo, then still a vassal of Ava, raided Hanthawaddy's territory, taking advantage of the larger kingdom's succession crisis. But Hanthawaddy's new king Binnya Ran II retaliated by laying siege to Toungoo in 1495–1496. Toungoo barely survived the siege; Mingyi Nyo, viceroy of Toungoo, would not provoke the larger neighbor for the remainder of his life. After he declared independence from Ava in 1510, Mingyi Nyo largely stayed out of the fighting raging between Ava and the Confederation of Shan States. When Ava fell to the combined forces of the Confederation and Prome in 1527, many people fled to Toungoo, the only region in Upper Burma at peace.

But Toungoo could not stay out of the warfare forever. War arrived uncomfortably close to Toungoo in 1532–1533 when the Confederation of Shan States, already ruling much of Upper Burma, attacked its erstwhile ally Prome, and sacked the city. Although the Confederation was content to keep Prome as a vassal, the Toungoo leadership was concerned that their city east of Prome on the same latitude, separated only by the Pegu Yoma range, was an "obvious next target." Fortunately for Toungoo, the Confederation was distracted by the leadership change after its principal leader Sawlon of Mohnyin was assassinated in 1533. Moreover, Toungoo's remote hard-to-reach location proved an asset. Unlike Prome, which sits on the Irrawaddy river, Toungoo was tucked away behind the Pegu Yoma range and was not connected to Upper Burma by any major water way, presenting a difficult logistical challenge for potential invaders. Meanwhile, refugees continued to flee to Toungoo, still the only kingdom unaffected by war. The little principality now commanded considerably more manpower than its traditional base allowed for, and it would soon punch above its weight. The Toungoo leadership decided that their kingdom "had to act quickly if it wished to avoid being swallowed up" by the confederation.

Tabinshwehti and his court selected Hanthawaddy as their first target because its king Takayutpi was a weak leader who did not command respect of his vassals. Takayutpi's brother-in-law Saw Binnya practically ruled Martaban region like a sovereign, and scarcely acknowledged the high king at Pegu (Bago). Takayutpi in turned made an alliance with the Prome Kingdom, a vassal of the Confederation.

== Initial raids (1534–1537) ==
The war began in late 1534 (Note: Chronicles (Hmannan Vol. 2 2003: 185) simply say that the war began in 896 ME (30 March 1534 – 29 March 1535). The war likely began in November 1534 since Burmese kings almost always fought in the dry season (November to May).) when a landlocked Toungoo led by Tabinshwehti and his deputy Bayinnaung, tried to break out of its increasingly narrow zone by launching a preemptive war against a weakly led Hanthawaddy. In the beginning, Toungoo's maneuvers amounted to mere raids of Hanthawaddy territory, and its initial dry-season raids in 1534–1535, 1535–1536, and 1536–1537 all failed against Pegu's fortified defenses aided by foreign mercenaries and firearms. In each campaign, Toungoo armies had only 6000 to 7000 men, a few hundred cavalry, and a few dozen war elephants and did not yet have access to foreign troops or firearms.

Unlike his father Binnya Ran II, King Takayutpi of Hanthawaddy could not organize any retaliatory action. His nominal subordinates in the Irrawaddy delta and Martaban did not send any help. Nonetheless, Pegu's defenses led by two leading ministers of the court, Binnya Law and Binnya Kyan, withstood the raids.

== Coup de grace (1538–1539) ==
=== Pegu ===
Toungoo used a stratagem to create a split in the Hanthawaddy camp, providing misinformation about the loyalty of the ministers. Surprisingly, Takayutpi believed Toungoo's misinformation, and executed the ministers who had been his tutors since childhood and were absolutely devoted to him. Then when Toungoo launched another invasion in late 1538, with 7,000 troops, Takayutpi was helpless, and decided to evacuate his capital rather than fight. Toungoo forces took Pegu without firing a shot.

The most telling part of the state of disarray of the once powerful kingdom was that Takayutpi and his armies chose to retreat to Prome, another kingdom, rather than to their own territory of Martaban whose ruler Takayutpi simply did not trust. The course of retreat was through the Irrawaddy delta. The direct route from Pegu to Prome, though much shorter, involved crossing the Bago Yoma range, and was not practical for large armies. Takayutpi divided the retreating Hanthawaddy forces into two. Five divisions of the army marched by land. Takayutpi and the remaining troops sailed by river in 700 boats.

=== Battle of Naungyo ===
At Pegu, Tabinshwehti and his deputy Bayinnaung well understood that they had gained Pegu only through a ruse, and that Hanthawaddy's military had not been defeated yet. Their top priority was to meet and defeat the Hanthawaddy army before they got inside the fortified walls of Prome. They knew that a large body of enemies inside walls with better leadership would pose a major problem for their tenuous hold on Lower Burma. Tabinshwehti sent Bayinnaung with a small army to chase the retreating army while he sailed up to Prome with his flotilla of war boats to chase Takayutpi's flotilla.

Bayinnaung's light troops caught up with the main Hanthawaddy armies led by Gen. Binnya Dala and Gen. Minye Aung Naing near Naungyo in the Irrawaddy delta. Bayinnaung nonetheless defeated the numerically superior and better armed force. Only a small portion of the Hanthawaddy forces made it to Prome. A decimated Hanthawaddy was no longer in a position to retake the lost territories from Toungoo.

=== Battle of Prome ===
After Pegu's improbable fall, the Shan Confederation, which ruled the former Ava Kingdom, finally took notice. When Toungoo's armies later attacked its vassal Prome, the Confederation sent in troops and broke the siege. Toungoo retreated but soon gained the allegiance of many Mon lords, and manpower after Hanthawaddy's king Takayutpi died a few months later.

== Martaban (1540–1541) ==
=== Preparations ===
Toungoo now held two out of the three Hanthawaddy provinces (the Irrawaddy delta and Pegu) but Martaban remained independent. The viceroy of Martaban, who had always acted like a sovereign, had declared himself king of Hanthawaddy since the death of Takayutpi. Tabinshwehti sent an ultimatum to Martaban and its vassals to submit in exchange for amnesty but Saw Binnya refused. He had fortified the wealthy port, and enlisted Portuguese mercenaries and seven warships led by Paulo de Seixas, guarded the harbor. Martaban's vassals wavered. The governor of Moulmein did not submit to Tabinshwehti but agreed not to provide any help to Martaban.

=== Siege ===
In November 1540, 13,000-strong Toungoo land and naval forces attacked the city. Toungoo forces now included 700 Portuguese mercenaries led by João Caeiro (Joano Cayeyro) who brought light artillery and muskets. However, the wealthy port's strong fortifications backed by Portuguese artillery and musket fire kept besiegers at bay. Toungoo's light Portuguese artillery proved "useless against ramparts backed by earthwork," and its "navy" of small war boats could not impose a complete blockade on the seven Portuguese ships guarding the harbor. The Toungoo command tried to complete the blockade about a month into the siege by sending in 300 war boats to storm the harbor but the venture ended badly, with most boats destroyed by the guns of the Portuguese ships.

For the next few months, Toungoo forces continued the siege from afar but the Toungoo command was concerned by the fast approaching rainy season. Even though the first naval attack failed, Adm. Smim Payu convinced Tabinshwehti, who was personally leading the siege, that their best chance for a breakthrough still lay in another naval attack. The king accepted the plan. The admiral went up the Salween River with thousands of men, and built two types of rafts. One type contained bamboo towers higher than the walls of the port. The others were fire-rafts.

While Toungoo forces prepared for the final assault, the city was starving. Saw Binnya finally offered to surrender provided that he be allowed to remain viceroy in exchange for an annual tribute of 30,000 viss (48,987.9 kg) of silver bullion and other valuable presents. Tabinshwehti rejected the offer, demanding an unconditional surrender instead. Saw Binnya then asked for safe-conduct out of the city for himself and his entire family, together with his treasures. It too was rejected by the Burmese king. In desperation, Saw Binnya appealed to the Portuguese viceroy at Goa for assistance, offering to become a vassal of Goa, in addition to an outright gift of half the amount of his treasure. The Portuguese were interested. A Portuguese captain listed the treasure as consisting of two shiploads of gold and silver, and 26 chests of precious stones. In addition, gold to be looted from the city's pagodas would fill 4 ships. But the Portuguese also feared the vengeance of Tabinshwehti, the new power in Lower Burma, and "wavered between greed and prudence". At the same time, Saw Binnya offered a large bribe to Caeiro to help him and his family escape. Caeiro seriously considered the overly generous offer but ultimately declined the offer as his deputies found out the proposal and threatened to report the matter to Tabinshwehti.

=== Final assault ===
While Saw Binnya was exhausting all his options, the Toungoo command was determined to sack the city before the rainy season. In May 1541, seven months into the siege, Smim Payu launched the second attack on the harbor. Several fire-rafts "with flames higher than a toddy tree" came floating down the river toward the Portuguese ships. Three of the seven Portuguese ships fled to the sea. The remaining four ships were either burned or captured. Then the rafts with mounted bamboo towers, crammed with troops and musketeers, slipped past the wreckage, and made it to the wall by the harbor. The Toungoo troops, who were exchanging musket fire with the defenders on the wall, then jumped over the wall and soon won a foothold. A section of the wall was mined and brought down. Inside the city, the defenders fought on, with Saw Binnya personally leading the fight on his war elephant. But they were soon overwhelmed. The sack raged for three days. Tabinshwehti ordered the execution of the viceroy, his family, and all the "gallant" defenders for they had refused his prior offer of amnesty. The mass execution had the desired effect. The governors of Moulmein (Mawlaymyaing) and southern territories (present-day Mon State), abutting then Siamese frontier submitted.

== Significance ==
The war was a crucial turning point in the history of Myanmar as well as in the history of mainland Southeast Asia. Toungoo's victory gave the upstart kingdom complete control of coastal Lower Burma's manpower, access to foreign firearms and maritime wealth to pay for them. Toungoo kings would leverage these newfound assets for further expansions in the remainder of the century, and build the largest empire in the history of Southeast Asia. Moreover, Toungoo's success in breaking out of an increasingly narrow dry zone not only saved the only remaining ethnic Burman-led kingdom from extinction but also ensured the continued rise of Burman culture and Burmese language in the Irrawaddy valley.

== Bibliography ==
- Fernquest, Jon (Autumn 2005). "Min-gyi-nyo, the Shan Invasions of Ava (1524–27), and the Beginnings of Expansionary Warfare in Toungoo Burma: 1486–1539" (PDF). SOAS Bulletin of Burma Research. 3 (2).
- Harvey, G. E. (1925). History of Burma: From the Earliest Times to 10 March 1824. London: Frank Cass & Co. Ltd.
- Htin Aung, Maung (1967). A History of Burma. New York and London: Cambridge University Press.
- Lieberman, Victor B. (2003). Strange Parallels: Southeast Asia in Global Context, c. 800–1830, volume 1, Integration on the Mainland. Cambridge University Press. ISBN 978-0-521-80496-7.
- Royal Historical Commission of Burma (1832). Hmannan Yazawin (in Burmese). Vol. 1–3 (2003 ed.). Yangon: Ministry of Information, Myanmar.
- Sein Lwin Lay, Kahtika U (1968). Mintaya Shwe Hti and Bayinnaung: Ketumadi Taungoo Yazawin (in Burmese) (2006, 2nd printing ed.). Yangon: Yan Aung Sarpay.
