= Shorto =

Shorto as a surname could refer to:

- Russell Shorto (b. 1959), American author and journalist.
- Harry Leonard Shorto (1919-1995), academic scholar of Austroasiatic languages.
