= Saw Lagun Ein =

Saw Lagun Ein စောလကွန်းအိန်

Viceroy of Martaban (Mottama)
- Reign: May 1541 – May 1550
- Predecessor: Saw Binnya
- Successor: Smim Htaw
- Born: Pegu (Bago)
- Died: May 1550? Martaban (Mottama)?
- Spouse: Younger sister of King Takayutpi
- House: Hanthawaddy
- Mother: Paternal aunt of Takayutpi
- Religion: Theravada Buddhism

Saw Lagun Ein (Burmese: စောလဂွန်းအိန် [sɔ́ ləɡʊ́ɴ ʔèiɴ]) was viceroy of Martaban (Mottama) from 1541 to 1550. The ethnic Mon viceroy was a top military adviser to King Tabinshwehti and Gen. Bayinnaung of Toungoo Dynasty. He fought alongside them in all their military campaigns from 1540 to 1549. He led the 1547–1548 campaign that retook the Tavoy frontier in the war against Siam (1547–49). He was overthrown by Smim Htaw in the chaos that followed Tabinshwehti's assassination in 1550.

== Background ==
Saw Lagun Ein (Note: (Pan Hla 2004: 176): Lagun Ein was a royal style, meaning "He Who Is Powerful Like Sakra", the ruler of the Tāvatiṃsa Heaven in Buddhist cosmology. Ein (အိန်) is the Mon derivative of Pali Indra, another name of Sakra.") was of Hanthawaddy royalty, a grandson of King Dhammazedi (r. 1471–1492) as well as a first cousin and brother-in-law of King Takayutpi of Hanthawaddy (r. 1526–1539). His mother was a paternal aunt of Takayutpi and he was married to a younger sister of Takayutpi. He was one of the Hanthawaddy nobles that entered the service of Tabinshwehti after Takayutpi died in exile.

== Viceroy and general ==
In May 1541, he was appointed viceroy of the province of Martaban (approximately, present-day Mon State) by Tabinshwehti. As a vassal ruler, he not only contributed manpower to the high king's nonstop military campaigns every year between 1541 and 1549 but also led armies in those campaigns. He was one of the three top generals (along with Bayinnaung and Smim Payu) in Toungoo's invasion of Upper Burma in 1543–44. In 1547–48, he successfully led Toungoo forces (4000 naval troops and 8000 land troops), and retook Ye and Tavoy (Dawei) from Siamese forces. He was under the command of Bayinnaung in the 1548–49 invasion of Siam.

In January/February 1550 (Tabodwe 911 ME), Lagun Ein went to the Irrawaddy delta with the king and his crew on an extended elephant hunting trip in search of an elusive "white elephant". He was asked to go along on the trip by Bayinnaung, who was concerned about the safety of the king. As Bayinnaung suspected, one of the king's closest advisers, the governor of Sittaung Smim Sawhtut, was planning to assassinate the king. Lagun Ein's constant presence foiled Sawhtut's plans for over two months but Sawhtut finally convinced the king to send Lagun Ein back to Martaban. Lagun Ein protested but had to obey the order. Soon after he left, the king was assassinated by Sawhtut's men.

After Tabinshwehti's death, the kingdom he had built up in the last 15 years promptly fell apart. Instead of submitting to his chosen successor Bayinnaung, each major governor declared himself independent. Smim Htaw, who had raised a rebellion in the delta since early 1550, took over the Martaban region. Though it is unclear as to what happened to Lagun Ein—Chronicles do not mention his name again—he was probably killed by Smim Htaw's men.

== Bibliography ==
- Harvey, G. E. (1925). History of Burma: From the Earliest Times to 10 March 1824. London: Frank Cass & Co. Ltd.
- Pan Hla, Nai (1968). Razadarit Ayedawbon (in Burmese) (8th printing, 2004 ed.). Yangon: Armanthit Sarpay.
- Royal Historical Commission of Burma (1832). Hmannan Yazawin (in Burmese). Vol. 1–3 (2003 ed.). Yangon: Ministry of Information, Myanmar.
- Sein Lwin Lay, Kahtika U (1968). Mintaya Shwe Hti and Bayinnaung: Ketumadi Taungoo Yazawin (in Burmese) (2006, 2nd printing ed.). Yangon: Yan Aung Sarpay.

Royal titles
Preceded by Saw Binnya as self-proclaimed king	Viceroy of Martaban; 1541–1550	Succeeded by Smim Htaw as self-proclaimed king
