= Agga Thiri Maya Dewi of Hanthawaddy =

Agga Thiri Maya Dewi အဂ္ဂသီရိမာယာဒေဝီ

Chief queen consort of Hanthawaddy
- Tenure: 1492? – 1526?
- Predecessor: Wihara Dewi
- Successor: Unknown
- Spouse: Binnya Ran II
- House: Hanthawaddy Pegu
- Religion: Theravada Buddhism

Agga Thiri Maya Dewi (Burmese: အဂ္ဂသီရိမာယာဒေဝီ, pronounced [ʔɛʔɡa̰ θìɹḭ màjà dèwì], Pali: Aggasīrimāyādevī) was a principal queen consort of King Binnya Ran II of Hanthawaddy. According to the Pak Lat Chronicles, she was the chief queen of the king in 1495. (Note: (Aung-Thwin 2017: 278–279, 345, 356) directly quoting H.L. Shorto's translation of the second volume of the Pak Lat Chronicles regarding Binnya Ran II's coronation ceremony at the Shwemawdaw Pagoda. The ceremony took over the course of two days (2 April to 3 April 1495). The dates of the two days as described in Pak Lat's original text are Thursday, the 9th waxing of Ashadha (Waso) 857 ME (Sunday, 31 May 1495), followed by the "next day" of Friday, the 11th waxing of Vaishakha (Kason) 857 ME (Friday, 3 April 1495). Both dates cannot be true since the first day is nearly a month later than the day that supposedly followed it. Furthermore, the first date translates to a Sunday (not Thursday), and thus is incorrect. The second date does translate to a Friday, and is likely correct.) She presumably became the chief queen at her husband's accession in 1492 but the exact duration of her reign is not known.

== Bibliography ==
- Aung-Thwin, Michael A. (2017). Myanmar in the Fifteenth Century. Honolulu: University of Hawai'i Press. ISBN 978-0-8248-6783-6.

Agga Thiri Maya Dewi of Hanthawaddy Hanthawaddy Dynasty
Royal titles
Preceded by Wihara Dewi	Chief queen consort of Hanthawaddy; 1492? – 1526?	Unknown
