= Saw Binnya =

Saw Binnya စောဗညား

Viceroy of Martaban (Mottama)
- Reign: 1510s–1541
- Successor: Saw Lagun Ein
- Died: May 1541; Martaban (Mottama)
- Spouse: Tala Kamu of Pegu
- House: Hanthawaddy
- Religion: Theravada Buddhism

Saw Binnya (Burmese: စောဗညား, Burmese pronunciation: [sɔ́ bəɲá]; died 1541) was viceroy of Martaban (Mottama) from c. 1510s to 1539, and the self-proclaimed king of the rump Hanthawaddy kingdom from 1539 to 1541. First appointed viceroy of Martaban, one of the three provinces of the Mon-speaking kingdom, by King Binnya Ran II, Saw Binnya ruled the province like a sovereign during the reign of King Takayutpi, his brother-in-law. Under his leadership, the port of Martaban became an international entrepôt, and grew tremendously wealthy. He was able to build up a formidable military of his own, replete with Portuguese mercenaries and arms. But his refusal to contribute to Takayutpi's war effort against Toungoo Dynasty greatly facilitated Toungoo's conquest of Pegu in 1538–1539, and ultimately resulted in the downfall of his own fiefdom in 1541. He was subsequently executed.

== Ruler of Martaban ==
Saw Binnya was appointed viceroy of the province of Martaban, one of the three provinces of Hanthawaddy, by King Binnya Ran II, c. 1510s. (He was already viceroy in 1519 when he signed a commercial treaty with the Portuguese, who spelled his name as "Chau Bainha". He was probably of high Hanthawaddy royalty, since only the most senior princes were appointed viceroy.) When Takayutpi became king in 1526, by the tradition of having blood ties with the sovereign, Saw Binnya took Takayutpi's eldest younger sister Princess Tala Kamu as his chief queen. Despite the initial gesture, he did not respect the 15-year-old king, who proved to be utterly disinterested in governing and spent his time in "frivolous amusements with bad companions".

In the following years, Saw Binnya scarcely acknowledged his overlord at Pegu, and ruled "the 32 districts of Martaban" (roughly, present-day Mon State and southern Kayin State) like a sovereign. His deputy Binnya U, governor of Moulmein (Mawlamyaing), was also married to a sister of Takayutpi but nonetheless was more loyal to him than the high king. Saw Binnya conducted his own trade and foreign relations. Under his leadership, Martaban became an entrepôt, and according to the accounts of Portuguese explorers, grew tremendously wealthy. Using the trade wealth, he was able to assemble a formidable military which by 1540 employed expensive Portuguese mercenaries, their firearms and warships.

He essentially declared independence from Pegu in 1534 by refusing to contribute to Takayutpi's war effort against Toungoo Dynasty as vassals were obligated to do. Takayutpi, not an able king, could not organize any retaliatory action against Toungoo or Martaban. In the following years, Saw Binnya was content to look on as Toungoo forces raided deeper and deeper into Lower Burma. He did not anticipate any immediate danger to his own realm as Toungoo without any foreign weapons repeatedly failed to take the Hanthawaddy capital Pegu (Bago), which was defended by foreign mercenaries. When Toungoo finally took Pegu in late 1538, Takayutpi so distrusted Saw Binnya that he chose to retreat to Prome Kingdom, another state, rather than to Martaban.

== War with Toungoo ==
Takayutpi died in early 1539 in exile, and Saw Binnya at once proclaimed himself king. He did not seem concerned by the arrival of the kingdom of Toungoo at his doorstep. In 1540, he received an ultimatum from King Tabinshwehti of Toungoo to submit in exchange for amnesty but he was unimpressed. He reckoned that Toungoo had gained Pegu only through a ruse against an incompetent ruler like Takayutpi, and that when Pegu's defenses were led by capable leaders, Toungoo could not take Pegu for four years. He believed that his Portuguese-backed military under his leadership could withstand any attack Toungoo could muster. He had already heavily fortified the city with high walls that could withstand even Portuguese cannon; deployed seven Portuguese warships to guard the harbor; and enlisted foreign mercenaries led by Paulo de Seixas to lead the defenses. He rejected the ultimatum.

Saw Binnya's confidence was not completely unfounded. In fact, the Toungoo command after the conquest of Pegu deliberated an attack on Martaban that would have begun in November 1539 but decided against it, citing the city's strong defenses. Instead, Toungoo prepared for war against Martaban throughout 1539 and 1540. By November 1540, Tabinshwehti had assembled a 13,000-strong force including 700 Portuguese troops who brought their muskets and cannon. In the meantime, Saw Binnya's defensive plans were frustrated by the governor of Moulmein's decision to stay out of the fight. (Binnya U also received Tabinshwehti's ultimatum. He did not submit to the Toungoo king but responded that he would stay out of the fight.) Abandoned by his vassals, Saw Binnya was now in a similar situation as the predicament he himself put Takayutpi in just a few years earlier.

In November 1540, Toungoo forces invaded, and quickly surrounded the city. Martaban's well-prepared defenses kept the besiegers at bay for months. However, mass starvation eventually set inside the city. Saw Binnya finally offered to surrender provided that he be allowed to remain viceroy in exchange for an annual tribute of 30,000 viss (48,987.9 kg) of silver bullion and other valuable presents. Tabinshwehti rejected the offer, demanding an unconditional surrender instead. Saw Binnya then asked for safe-conduct out of the city for himself and his entire family, together with his treasures. It too was rejected by the Burmese king. In desperation, Saw Binnya appealed to the Portuguese viceroy at Goa for assistance, offering to become a vassal of Goa, in addition to an outright gift of half the amount of his treasury. The Portuguese were interested. A Portuguese captain listed the treasure as consisting of two shiploads of gold and silver, and 26 chests of precious stones. In addition, gold to be looted from the city's pagodas would fill 4 ships. But the Portuguese also feared the vengeance of Tabinshwehti, the new power in Lower Burma, and "wavered between greed and prudence". At the same time, Saw Binnya offered a large bribe to João Caeiro, the leader of Portuguese mercenaries fighting for Toungoo, to help him and his family escape. Caeiro seriously considered the overly generous offer but ultimately declined the offer as his deputies found out the proposal and threatened to report the matter to Tabinshwehti.

== Death ==
In May 1541, after a seven-month siege, Toungoo naval forces led by Adm. Smim Payu broke through the seven Portuguese ships at the harbor, and the city's defenses were breached. Inside the city, Saw Binnya, described as athletic and brave, led his forces atop a war elephant against the invaders. He is said to have fought off several one-on-one combats on elephant-back. He was finally defeated in combat by Commander Nanda Kyawthu, and was arrested. The viceroy remained chivalrous to the end. He congratulated Nanda Kyawthu for his victory, and gave the Toungoo commander presents from his treasury. Tabinshwehti congratulated Saw Binnya for his bravery and chivalry but did not forgive him. The Toungoo king ordered the execution of the viceroy, his family and all the "gallant defenders" of the city. The mass execution had the desired effect: The remaining vassals of Martaban down to the Siamese border duly submitted to Toungoo.

== Bibliography ==
- Harvey, G. E. (1925). History of Burma: From the Earliest Times to 10 March 1824. London: Frank Cass & Co. Ltd.
- Htin Aung, Maung (1967). A History of Burma. New York and London: Cambridge University Press.
- Phayre, Lt. Gen. Sir Arthur P. (1883). History of Burma (1967 ed.). London: Susil Gupta.
- Royal Historical Commission of Burma (1832). Hmannan Yazawin (in Burmese). Vol. 1–3 (2003 ed.). Yangon: Ministry of Information, Myanmar.
- Sein Lwin Lay, Kahtika U (1968). Mintaya Shwe Hti and Bayinnaung: Ketumadi Taungoo Yazawin (in Burmese) (2006, 2nd printing ed.). Yangon: Yan Aung Sarpay.

Royal titles
Preceded by	Viceroy of Martaban; 1510s–1541	Succeeded by Saw Lagun Ein
