= Caeiro =

Caeiro is a Portuguese surname. Notable people with the surname include:

- Celeste Caeiro (1933–2024), Portuguese pacifist worker
- Francisco José Caeiro (1890–1976), Portuguese politician
- João Caeiro (died 1548), Portuguese mercenary
- José Caeiro (1925–1981), Spanish footballer
- Teresa Caeiro (1969–2025), Portuguese lawyer and politician
- Tiago Caeiro (born 1984), Portuguese footballer

== See also ==
- Alberto Caeiro, heteronym of Fernando Pessoa
