= Battle of Naungyo =

1538 battle

- Part of Toungoo–Hanthawaddy War (1534–41)
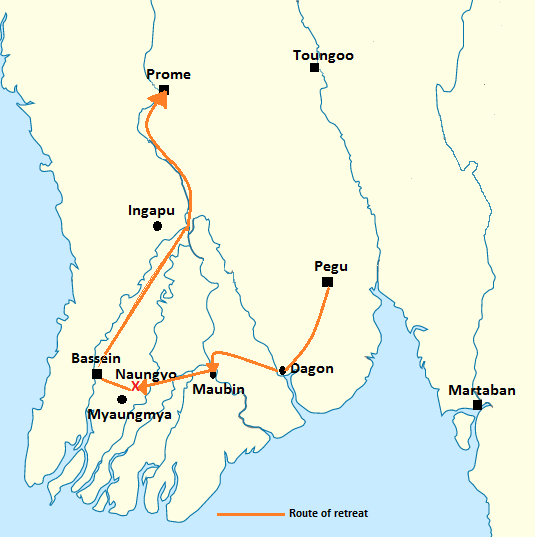
- Path of retreat by Hanthawaddy forces
Date	November/December 1538
Location	Naungyo, Irrawaddy delta Kingdom of Hanthawaddy
Result	Decisive Toungoo victory

Belligerents
Toungoo Kingdom	Hanthawaddy kingdom

Commanders and leaders
Bayinnaung; Taw Maing Ye; Bayathingyan	Binnya Dala; Minye Aung Naing †

Strength
10,000; 500 horses 50 elephants	80,000; 800 horses 200 elephants

The Battle of Naungyo (Burmese: နောင်ရိုးတိုက်ပွဲ [nàʊɰ̃jó taɪʔpwɛ́]) was a land battle fought between the armies of the Toungoo Kingdom and Hanthawaddy kingdom during the Toungoo–Hanthawaddy War (1534–41) in late 1538. The battle was the most decisive Toungoo victory of the war. Toungoo armies led by Gen. Kyawhtin Nawrahta (later Bayinnaung) decisively defeated a numerically far superior and better armed force of Hanthawaddy led by Gen. Binnya Dala and Gen. Minye Aung Naing. Only a small portion of the Hanthawaddy forces made it to their intended destination–the fortified city of Prome (Pyay). A decimated Hanthawaddy was no longer in a position to retake the lost territories from Toungoo.

The battle is one of the most famous battles in Burmese history. It was after this battle that Kyawhtin Nawrahta was given the title of Bayinnaung (lit. Royal Elder Brother) by his brother-in-law King Tabinshwehti. The battle is deemed "the first characteristic touch of the great Bayinnaung" who later went on to found the largest empire in the history of Southeast Asia.

The term "Naungyo" is an entrenched part of Burmese lexicon. It is customary to say "နောင်ရိုး စိတ်ဓာတ်ရှိပါ" (lit. "Have Naungyo spirit") or "ဘုရင့်နောင် ဖောင်ဖျက်သလိုလုပ်" (lit. "Do as Bayinnaung destroyed the rafts") to encourage or urge someone to have a sink-or-swim mentality.

== Origins ==
In the 1530s, Hanthawaddy (today's Lower Burma) was the most prosperous and powerful of all the small kingdoms that came into existence after the collapse of Pagan Empire in 1287. Toungoo was a former vassal state of Ava, founded only in 1510. When Ava fell to the Confederation of Shan States in 1527, Toungoo was surrounded by larger kingdoms on all sides: the Confederation in the north, its vassal Prome in the west, and Hanthawaddy in the south. Toungoo's remote location–east of the Bago Yoma mountain range and away from the main Irrawaddy river waterway–proved a good shelter for many refugees fleeing from Ava.

=== Toungoo–Hanthawaddy War ===
Though the larger kingdoms were not necessarily hostile to Toungoo yet, Tabinshwehti decided not to wait and took the initiative. He chose Hanthawaddy as his target because its king Takayutpi was an ineffective ruler who was not respected by his own governors. Beginning in late 1534, Toungoo began annual dry-season raids into Hanthawaddy territory. For three consecutive years, Toungoo could not make headway against Pegu's (Bago's) fortified defenses led by two experienced ministers and aided by foreign mercenaries with guns. Unable to break the defenses, Toungoo finally used a stratagem to create a split in the Hanthawaddy camp. Takayutpi foolishly believed Toungoo's misinformation about the loyalty of the two ministers, who had been his tutors since childhood and were absolutely devoted to him, and executed them.

When Toungoo again invaded in late 1538, Takayutpi, now without his best generals, lost heart and fled Pegu for Prome (Pyay) where his brother-in-law Narapati was king. Toungoo took the capital city of Pegu without firing a shot. Takayutpi did not retreat to Martaban, which nominally was Hanthawaddy territory because he did not trust the governor there, Saw Binnya, also his brother-in-law. Instead he chose to go to Prome which was a vassal of the Confederation-held Ava.

=== Flight for Prome ===
The course of retreat was through the Irrawaddy delta. The direct route from Pegu to Prome, though much shorter, involved crossing the Bago Yoma range, and was not practical for large armies. Takayutpi divided the retreating Hanthawaddy forces into two. Five divisions of the army marched by land. Takayutpi and the remaining troops sailed by river in 700 boats.

At Pegu, Tabinshwehti and his deputy Bayinnaung well understood that they had gained Pegu only through a ruse, and that Hanthawaddy's military had not been defeated yet. Their top priority was to meet and defeat the Hanthawaddy army before they got inside the fortified walls of Prome. This was based on their unsuccessful sieges of a fortified Pegu (1534–1537). They knew that a large body of enemies inside walls with better leadership would pose a huge problem for their tenuous hold on Lower Burma. Tabinshwehti sent Bayinnaung with a small army to chase the retreating army while he sailed up to Prome with his flotilla of war boats to chase Takayutpi's flotilla.

Bayinnaung's light troops caught up with the larger Hanthawaddy army at Naungyo, just separated by a river. (For all its fame, the exact location of Naungyo is not known. Chronicles simply report Naungyo as a delta town en route to Prome. A group of Burmese historians led by Than Tun retraced the battle route in 1982 and concluded that Naungyoe might be somewhere around Panmawaddy River in Einme Township in Ayeyarwady Region.)

Despite his commanders' remonstrations, Bayinnaung decided to engage the much larger and better armed enemy. The famous battle ensued.

== Battle ==
=== Armies ===
The retreating Hanthawaddy army was led by generals Binnya Dala (ဗညားဒလ), Minye Aung Naing (မင်းရဲအောင်နိုင်), Epyathi (အဲပြသီ), Ye Thin Yan (ရဲသင်ရန်), and Paikkamyin (ပိုက်ကမြင်). Burmese chronicles report that the Hanthawaddy forces consisted of 80,000 men, 800 horses, and 200 elephants. The Toungoo army was led by Bayinnaung with deputies Taw Maing Ye (တော်မိုင်းရဲ) and Bayathingyan (ဘယသင်္ကြန်). Their total strength was 10,000 men, 500 horses, and 50 elephants.

The actual numbers however were likely an order of magnitude less. (The Burmese chronicles routinely overestimate the numbers, at least by an order of magnitude. Western historians estimate that even in later Konbaung era which had a far larger territory than Hanthawaddy or tiny Toungoo, Konbaung could not have fielded more than 60,000 men. For example, at the peak of mobilization Konbaung general Maha Bandula fielded 30,000 men before the Battle of Yangon in 1824. According to historian GE Harvey's analysis of chronicles figures cross-checked with British and Chinese figures in later eras, the chronicles routinely overestimated by an order of magnitude.)

Per Harvey's analysis, the strength figures would be 8,000 on the Hanthawaddy side and 1,000 on the Toungoo side. Furthermore, Hanthawaddy's overall strength was most likely not eight times greater than Toungoo as reported in Burmese chronicles. It too was likely an exaggeration. Nonetheless, all historians agree that Hanthawaddy had a much larger force, and better weaponry. Its forces included Portuguese and Indian mercenaries with guns. Toungoo still did not have access to foreign mercenaries.

=== Destroying the rafts ===
When the Toungoo scouts reported a greatly superior enemy force on the other side, Bayinnaung's commanders recommended not engaging the enemy. But Bayinnaung knew that the enemy was demoralized and his troops were better disciplined (and indeed better led). He decided to push ahead. Because the Hanthawaddy forces had taken all the boats, he improvised rafts and put his men across the river.

Just before the attack, a messenger from Tabinshwehti arrived, and handed Bayinnaung a message that said “if he found the enemy he should not engage them but wait for the main army.”

Bayinnaung replied: Tell His Majesty that we have not only contacted the enemy but also routed them.

Taw Maing Ye, one of his deputy commanders, said: You have reported a victory before we have fought, and the odds are against us. We shall even lose. Think how the king will punish us then!?

Bayinnaung answered: If we lose? Why then we die here, and who can punish dead men?

After all his men had crossed the river, he ordered all the rafts be destroyed. His officers again remonstrated, saying:

The enemy are ten to one and we shall never get out of this alive if you destroy the rafts.
Just so, said Bayinnaung, Comrades, we have got to win now.

=== Engagement ===
Hanthawaddy generals Binnya Dala and Min Ye Aung Naing were unconcerned with the small army before them, and were ready to meet them. Bayinnaung ordered a three-pronged attack on the enemy:

- 300 men, 200 horses, 15 elephants led by Bayathingyan on the left wing
- 300 men, 200 horses, 15 elephants led by Taw Maing Ye on the right wing
- 400 men, 100 horses, 20 elephants led by himself in the center.

With retreat no longer an option, Toungoo forces charged towards a much larger enemy massed before them. Bayinnaung on his war elephant Swe La Man (စွယ်လမန်) charged towards the opposing general Binnya Dala, who was also on his war elephant. Binnya Dala lost heart, and then jumped onto a horse and fled. Next, Minye Aung Naing was killed on his war elephant. Having lost their two top leaders, Hanthawaddy troops lost their composure and organization. Toungoo's three lines of attack soon split the Hanthawaddy body into four disjointed camps, all in disarray. Soon the resistance completely collapsed. Troops either fled or surrendered en masse. Only a decimated Hanthawaddy force made it to Prome.

Tabinshwehti arrived on the scene one day later. The king was so pleased with the victory that he granted Bayinnaung (who until that time was Kyawhtin Nawrahta) the title of Bayinnaung (ဘုရင့်နောင်, or Royal Elder Brother), and gave Hlaing as an appanage.

== Consequences ==
The battle turned out to be the turning point of the Toungoo-Hanthawaddy War. Although Toungoo had been raiding the Hanthawaddy territory since 1535, Toungoo had not won any head-to-head battles against a sizable Hanthawaddy army. The main reason a smaller kingdom like Toungoo could even raid the territory of a larger kingdom like Hanthawaddy was because the latter's king Takayutpi was incompetent.

Bayinnaung's strategy to engage the enemy in the open field proved correct. When Toungoo forces attacked Prome a few weeks later, they still could not break the defenses and had to retreat. Takayutpi urged his allies the Confederation of Shan States and Prome to follow up and attack, and put him back on the throne. But his allies refused. They might have agreed to attack had Takayutpi still retained a sizable army. And Toungoo's hold on the former Hanthawaddy territories would still have been in question. Desperate, Takayutpi tried to raise an army by himself. He died a few months later from illness, while looking for war elephants.

After Takayutpi died, many Mon lords came in to pay allegiance wholesale. With increased manpower, Toungoo captured Martaban in 1541, and Prome itself in 1542, on its way to reuniting the former lands of the Pagan Empire and beyond. In many ways, the First Toungoo Empire had its beginnings in this improbable victory.

== Legacy ==
The victory was ascribed to the bravery and determination of Bayinaung against impossible odds and the name of Naungyo, along with the name of Bayinaung went down in legend. Historian Harvey calls it "the first characteristic touch of the great Bayinnaung; it is like a breath of fresh air after three centuries of manikins" (since the Pagan dynasty). Bayinnaung would go on to conquer half of mainland Southeast Asia, founding the largest empire in the history of Southeast Asia.

The battle is one of the most famous battles in Burmese military history, and learned by school children. The term "Naungyo" is an entrenched part of Burmese lexicon. It is customary to say "နောင်ရိုး စိတ်ဓာတ်ရှိ" (lit. "Have Naungyo spirit") or "ဘုရင့်နောင် ဖောင်ဖျက်သလိုလုပ်" (lit. "Do as Bayinnaung destroyed the rafts") to encourage someone in a sink-or-swim situation.

== Bibliography ==
- Harvey, G. E. (1925). History of Burma: From the Earliest Times to 10 March 1824. London: Frank Cass & Co. Ltd.
- Htin Aung, Maung (1967). A History of Burma. New York and London: Cambridge University Press.
- Royal Historical Commission of Burma (1832). Hmannan Yazawin (in Burmese). Vol. 1–3 (2003 ed.). Yangon: Ministry of Information, Myanmar.
- Kyaw Kyaw Tun (28 March 2005). "The hunt for the ancient battle ground of Naungyo". The Myanmar Times.
