= Maha Yaza Dewi (Binnya Ran II) =

Maha Yaza Dewi မဟာရာဇဒေဝီ

Queen consort of Hanthawaddy
- Tenure: 1492? – 1526?
- Predecessor: ?
- Successor: ?
- Spouse: Binnya Ran II
- House: Hanthawaddy Pegu
- Religion: Theravada Buddhism

Maha Yaza Dewi (Burmese: မဟာရာဇဒေဝီ, pronounced [məhà jàza̰ dèwì], Mahārājadevī) was a principal queen consort of King Binnya Ran II of Hanthawaddy. She was the second-ranked queen (after the chief queen) of the king in 1495. (Note: The second ranked queen as she sat to the left of the king at the 1495 coronation ceremony in (Aung-Thwin 2017: 278–279, 345, 356), which directly quoted H.L. Shorto's translation of the second volume of the Pak Lat Chronicles regarding Binnya Ran II's coronation ceremony at the Shwemawdaw Pagoda. The ceremony took over the course of two days (2 April to 3 April 1495). The dates of the two days as described in Pak Lat's original text are Thursday, the 9th waxing of Ashadha [Waso] 857 ME (Sunday, 31 May 1495), followed by the "next day" of Friday, the 11th waxing of Vaishakha [Kason] 857 ME (Friday, 3 April 1495). Both dates cannot be true since the first day is nearly a month later than the day that supposedly followed it. Furthermore, the first date translates to a Thursday, and is incorrect. The second date does translate to a Friday, and is likely correct.)

== Bibliography ==
- Aung-Thwin, Michael A. (2017). Myanmar in the Fifteenth Century. Honolulu: University of Hawai'i Press. ISBN 978-0-8248-6783-6.

Maha Yaza Dewi (Binnya Ran II) Hanthawaddy Dynasty
Royal titles
Preceded by ?	Queen consort of Hanthawaddy; 1492? – 1526?	Succeeded by ?
