= Smim Payu =

Governor of Myaungmya
- In office 1541–1544
- Succeeded by: Satu Gamani

Minister at Toungoo court
- In office 1536–1544
- Monarch: Tabinshwehti

Minister at Hanthawaddy court
- In office ?–1536
- Monarch: Takayutpi

Personal details
- Born: Payu
- Died: c. November/December 1544; Natdaw 906 ME

Military service
- Branch/service: Royal Burmese Navy; Royal Burmese Army
- Years of service: 1536–1544
- Rank: Admiral, General
- Battles/wars: Battle of Martaban (1541); Battle of Prome (1541–1542); Battle of Prome (1543–1544)

Smim Payu (Burmese: သမိန်ပရူ, (Note: (Sein Lwin Lay 2006: 181): The Maha Yazawin Chronicle spells it သမိန်ဖရူး, [θəmèiɴ pʰəjú] but all later chronicles spell it သမိန်ပရူ, [θəmèiɴ pəjù].) Burmese pronunciation: [θəmèiɴ pəjù]; died 1544) was a general and admiral of the Royal Burmese Armed Forces, and a senior minister at the court of King Tabinshwehti of Toungoo Dynasty from 1536 to 1544. The ethnic Mon commander was originally a minister at the court of King Takayutpi of Hanthawaddy but joined Tabinshwehti's service in 1536 and rose to be one of the top advisers to the Toungoo king. He is most well known for planning and commanding the 1541 naval attack on Martaban (Mottama) that finally breached the defenses of the last Hanthawaddy holdout, and ended the Toungoo–Hanthawaddy War (1534–1541).

== Military career ==
=== Switching to Tabinshwehti's side ===
Smim Payu was a minister at the court of King Takayutpi and a general in the Hanthawaddy Army. He battled Toungoo forces early in the Toungoo–Hanthawaddy War (1534–1541). In November 1536, he commanded a cavalry battalion in the Hanthawaddy regiments sent to the front to meet the invading Toungoo forces on their way to Pegu, the capital of Hanthawaddy. The opposing armies met near Kawliya (modern Thongwa, Bago Region), and the Hanthawaddy army was defeated. Payu himself was captured. After the capture, Payu decided to switch sides. He was made a senior commander in the Toungoo army and an adviser to King Tabinshwehti. In the 1538–1539 campaign that finally captured Pegu, Payu commanded one of the seven flotillas that chased the retreating Hanthawaddy forces.

=== Battle of Martaban (1540–1541) ===
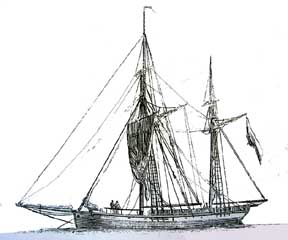
A European galliot of the era

He made his name at the battle of Martaban. The city of Martaban (Mottama) on the upper Tenasserim coast was the last Hanthawaddy holdout. In November 1541, Toungoo forces laid siege to the port city. He led an army at first but was later reassigned to take command of the Toungoo navy with the rank of admiral (လှေတပ်ဝန်; lit. "Minister of War Boats"). (Note: (Sein Lwin Lay 2006: 182): Tabinshwehti was the first Burmese king on record to use the term wun ဝန် (lit. "one who bears the responsibility"). Earlier kings simply used the term amat (အမတ်) (meaning "minister") for senior court officials.) For months, Toungoo forces tried but could not break through the wealthy port's heavily fortified defenses that included Portuguese mercenaries, firearms and warships. Toungoo armies could not even get near the high walls of the city defended by Portuguese muskets and cannon. Payu's "navy", which consisted of small war boats, too was unable to take on seven Portuguese warships guarding the harbor.

Payu then proposed a plan to the Toungoo command that the main attack needed go through the harbor. The king, who was personally leading the siege, accepted the plan, and appointed him to carry it out. The admiral went up the Salween River with thousands of men, and built two types of rafts. One type contained bamboo towers higher than the walls of the port. The others were fire-rafts. In May 1541, seven months into the siege and only weeks away from the rainy season, several fire-rafts "with flames higher than a toddy tree" came floating down the river toward the Portuguese ships guarding the harbor. Three of the seven Portuguese ships fled to the sea. The remaining four ships were either burned or captured. Then the rafts with mounted bamboo towers, crammed with troops and musketeers, slipped past the wreckage, and made it to the wall by the harbor. The Toungoo troops, who were exchanging musket fire with the defenders on the wall, then jumped over and soon won a foothold. The city fell, and the upper Tenasserim coast came under Toungoo rule.

Payu was showered with awards by the grateful king. He was given Myaungmya in fief and assigned his own cavalry and elephant regiments. He was also given the responsibility to administer the newly enlarged kingdom with Bayinnaung, the king's deputy.

=== Battle of Prome (1541–1542, 1543–1544) ===
Payu was the joint commander of the navy (with Nanda Yawda, governor of Thamyindon) in Toungoo's November 1541 attack on Prome Kingdom. Toungoo forces took the city of Prome (Pyay) in May 1542. In response, Prome's erstwhile overlord Confederation of Shan States tried to retake Prome in December 1543. Payu was one of the three top military strategists (along with Bayinnaung and Saw Lagun Ein) advising the king. (Payu and Lagun Ein were under the command of Bayinnaung.) Faced with an impending naval and land invasion, the troika advised that Toungoo forces focus on defeating the Confederation's navy first. Their strategy, Payu noted, was modeled after the strategy used by King Razadarit against King Minkhaung I in the Forty Years' War. Tabinshwehti agreed. In December 1543, the Toungoo navy lured the Confederation navy (consisted of 30 large war boats, 30 fast war boats, and 50 cargo ships) to an area where the Toungoo armies had set up artillery on both banks of the Irrawaddy. The Confederation navy was smashed by artillery fire. Without naval support, the 16,000-strong Confederation armies could not break Toungoo lines, and retreated after a month in January 1544.

== Death ==
Smim Payu died in late 1544. (Note: Chronicles (Hmannan Vol. 2 2003: 222–223) simply state that he died in 906 ME (29 March 1544 to 29 March 1545). But since the entry on his death comes after the entry on the king's palace addition in Natdaw 906 ME (15 November 1544 to 13 December 1544), he likely died sometime between 15 November 1544 and 29 March 1545. Moreover, the entry on his death is followed by the entry on the Confederation's attack on Salin, which also took place in 906 ME. Since most campaigns took place early in the dry season (November/December), Payu most likely died in November/December 1544.) He was deeply respected by the ethnic Mon lords of Lower Burma. Chronicles report that all of the Mon lords shaved their heads in mourning. His governorship at Myaungmya was succeeded by Satu Gamani.

== Bibliography ==
- Harvey, G. E. (1925). History of Burma: From the Earliest Times to 10 March 1824. London: Frank Cass & Co. Ltd.
- Htin Aung, Maung (1967). A History of Burma. New York and London: Cambridge University Press.
- Royal Historical Commission of Burma (1832). Hmannan Yazawin (in Burmese). Vol. 1–3 (2003 ed.). Yangon: Ministry of Information, Myanmar.
- Sein Lwin Lay, Kahtika U (1968). Mintaya Shwe Hti and Bayinnaung: Ketumadi Taungoo Yazawin (in Burmese) (2006, 2nd printing ed.). Yangon: Yan Aung Sarpay.

Royal titles
Preceded by	Governor of Myaungmya; 1541 – 1544	Succeeded by Satu Gamani
