= João Caeiro =

Portuguese mercenary

- Born: João Caeiro
- Died: 1548; Pathein?
- Citizenship: Portuguese
- Occupation: Mercenary
- Known for: Battle of Martaban (1540–41)

João Caeiro (also spelled as João Cayeyro, Joano Cayeyro, John Cayero) was a 16th-century Portuguese mercenary in the service of King Tabinshwehti of the Toungoo Dynasty, rulers in modern day Burma (Myanmar). He was the leader of a group of 700 Portuguese mercenaries who as musketeers and artillery men fought at the battle of Martaban (1540–41). They were opposed by Martaban's defenses which employed another group of Portuguese mercenaries led Paulo de Seixas. Caeiro is said to have seriously considered defecting to the side of Saw Binnya, the ruler of Martaban, who had offered him an enormous bribe. He rejected the offer after his Portuguese officers threatened to report the matter to the Burmese king.

== Death ==
João Caeiro died in 1548, possibly in Pathein (Bassein). He left 13,000 to 14,000 pardaos (Indo-Portuguese silver coins), which were taken into Portuguese India's treasury, according to a report dated 24 December 1548 by Simão Botelho, the financial superintendent of Portuguese India.

== Bibliography ==
- Harvey, G. E. (1925). History of Burma: From the Earliest Times to 10 March 1824. London: Frank Cass & Co. Ltd.
- Pinto, Fernão Mendes (1989). Rebecca. D. Catz (ed.). The travels of Mendes Pinto (illustrated ed.). Chicago: University of Chicago Press. ISBN 9780226669519.
- Ryley, John Horton (1899). Ralph Fitch, England's Pioneer to India and Burma: His Companions and Contemporaries, with His Remarkable Narrative Told in His Own Words. London: T. Fisher Unwin.
