= Binnya Law =

Burmese senior minister

Senior Minister of Hanthawaddy kingdom
- In office 1526–1538
- Monarch: Takayutpi

Personal details
- Born: Binnya Law
- Died: 1538 Pegu (Bago)

Binnya Law (Burmese: ဗညားလော, Burmese pronunciation: [bəɲá lɔ́]; died 1538) was a senior minister at the court of King Takayutpi of Hanthawaddy. He and Binnya Kyan, another senior minister, organized and led the coastal kingdom's defenses, which successfully repulsed the upstart Toungoo's three dry season raids between 1534 and 1538. They both were childhood tutors of the young king, and were absolutely devoted to him. Nonetheless, both ministers were executed in 1538 by the young king who believed in Toungoo's misinformation that the ministers were Toungoo moles. After their death, the king found himself helpless. When Toungoo forces came once again in late 1538, he decided to flee rather than fight.

== Bibliography ==
- Htin Aung, Maung (1967). A History of Burma. New York and London: Cambridge University Press.
- Sein Lwin Lay, Kahtika U (1968). Mintaya Shwe Hti and Bayinnaung: Ketumadi Taungoo Yazawin (in Burmese) (2006, 2nd printing ed.). Yangon: Yan Aung Sarpay.
