= Yaza Dewi (Binnya Ran II) =

Yaza Dewi ရာဇဒေဝီ

Queen consort of Hanthawaddy
- Tenure: 1492? – 1526?
- Predecessor: ?
- Successor: ?
- Spouse: Binnya Ran II
- House: Hanthawaddy Pegu
- Religion: Theravada Buddhism

Yaza Dewi (Burmese: ရာဇဒေဝီ, Burmese pronunciation: [jàza̰ dèwì], Pali: Rājadevī) was a principal queen consort of King Binnya Ran II of Hanthawaddy. She was the fourth of the four senior queens who partook in Ran's coronation ceremony in April 1495.

== Bibliography ==
- Aung-Thwin, Michael A. (2017). Myanmar in the Fifteenth Century. Honolulu: University of Hawai'i Press. ISBN 978-0-8248-6783-6.

Yaza Dewi (Binnya Ran II) Hanthawaddy Dynasty
Royal titles
Preceded by ?	Queen consort of Hanthawaddy; 1492? – 1526?	Succeeded by ?
