= Atula Dewi (Binnya Ran II) =

Atula Dewi အတုလဒေဝီ

Queen consort of Hanthawaddy
- Tenure: 1492? – 1526?
- Predecessor: ?
- Successor: ?
- Spouse: Binnya Ran II
- House: Hanthawaddy Pegu
- Religion: Theravada Buddhism

Atula Dewi (Burmese: အတုလဒေဝီ, pronounced [ʔətṵla̰ dèwì], Pali: Atuladevī) was a principal queen consort of King Binnya Ran II of Hanthawaddy. She was the third of the four senior queens who partook in Ran's coronation ceremony in April 1495.

== Bibliography ==
- Aung-Thwin, Michael A. (2017). Myanmar in the Fifteenth Century. Honolulu: University of Hawai'i Press. ISBN 978-0-8248-6783-6.

Atula Dewi (Binnya Ran II) Hanthawaddy Dynasty
Royal titles
Preceded by ?	Queen consort of Hanthawaddy; 1492? – 1526?	Succeeded by ?
