= Smim Sawhtut =

16th-century pretender to the Hanthawaddy throne

Smim Sawhtut သမိန်စောထွတ်

King of Hanthawaddy
- Reign: mid June – August 1550
- Predecessor: Takayutpi
- Successor: Smim Htaw
- Died: August 1550; Pegu
- Religion: Theravada Buddhism

Smim Sawhtut (Burmese: သမိန်စောထွတ်, pronounced [θəmèiɰ̃ sɔ́ tʰʊʔ]; died August 1550) was a pretender to the Hanthawaddy throne, who assassinated King Tabinshwehti of Toungoo. The ethnic Mon governor of Sittaung was a minister in the court of Tabinshwehti, who had conquered the Mon-speaking Hanthawaddy Pegu in 1539. He became a close confidant of the king. On 30 April 1550, he lured the king to the region near Pantanaw in the Irrawaddy delta to search for a white elephant—considered auspicious by the Burmese, and there assassinated him.

After the assassination, Smim Sawhtut returned to Sittaung, and proclaimed himself king. About a month a half later, the ethnic Mon ministers at the capital Pegu (Bago) then drove out Minkhaung, Bayinnaung's brother who was there as the interim governor while Tabinshwehti and Bayinnaung were away. (Bayinnaung was away in the delta, chasing Smim Htaw, another pretender to the throne.) The ministers then invited Sawhtut, though not of royal lineage, to take the throne, thus restoring the Mon lineage of the dynasty.

In late June 1550, Bayinnaungwho, the heir apparent under Tabinshwehti, led his warriors to left for Toungoo to start their war of restoration. They marched north to Hinthada, and then crossed over to the eastern side of Bago Yoma, north of Pegu. Sawhtut came out with his army to stop them. Bayinnaung paid no heed and marched on. Discovering that Bayinnaung's target was not Pegu, Sawhtut did not engage them.

At Pegu, Sawhtut proved a tyrant as king, and soon alienated the goodwill of the people had felt for a king of their own ethnicity. The ministers then secretly invited Smim Htaw, who had been driven out of the delta by Bayinnaung to Pegu, but had now fled to Martaban. Smim Htaw collected a large body of men, and marched to Pegu. The two sides fought a battle outside the capital. Smim Htaw's side was victorious. Smim Sawhtut was captured and beheaded.

Smim Sawhtut Hanthawaddy Dynasty Died: August 1550
Regnal titles
Preceded by Takayutpi	King of Hanthawaddy; June – August 1550	Succeeded by Smim Htaw
