= Binnya Ran II =

Binnya Ran II ဒုတိယ ဗညားရံ

King of Hanthawaddy
- Reign: c. 1492–1526
- Coronation: 29 January 1493 (Note: (Schmidt 1906: 139): 13th waxing of Tabodwe 854 ME = 29 January 1493)
- Predecessor: Dhammazedi
- Successor: Taka Yut Pi
- Born: c. February 1469; Tuesday, 830 ME; Pegu (Bago)
- Died: 1526 (aged 57); 888 ME; Pegu
- Consort: Agga Thiri Maya Dewi; Maha Yaza Dewi; Atula Dewi; Yaza Dewi
- Issue: Yazadipati; Taka Yut Pi; Smim Htaw
- House: Wareru
- Father: Dhammazedi
- Mother: Yaza Dewi II of Hanthawaddy
- Religion: Theravada Buddhism

Binnya Ran II (Burmese: ဒုတိယ ဗညားရံ, pronounced [dṵtḭja̰ bəɲá jàɰ̃]; Mon: ဗညားရာံ; 1469–1526) the 17th king of the Kingdom of Hanthawaddy in Burma from 1492 to 1526. He was revered for his gentleness although his first act as king was to enforce the massacre of the kinsmen, putting all the royal offspring to death.

During the confusion of Binnya Ran's ascension, Mingyi Nyo of Toungoo who at the time was a vassal of Ava, without King Minkhaung II's permission, sent a probing raid into Hanthawaddy territory. Binnya Ran II sent in a retaliatory raid of the city of Toungoo itself. After the show of force, Hanthawaddy was free of any incursions.

In 1501, he assembled an army of thousands to travel up the Irrawaddy river to pay pilgrimage to the Shwezigon Pagoda at Pagan inside Ava's territory. When the king of Prome, a small kingdom wedged between Ava and Hanthawaddy, checked him, he replied: "I could conquer both you and Ava but I do not wish. I only wish to worship before the Shwezigon". He returned peacefully after having worshiped there.

== Family ==
The king had at least four senior queens in 1495. (Note: (Aung-Thwin 2017: 278–279, 345, 356) directly quoting H.L. Shorto's translation of the second volume of the Pak Lat Chronicles regarding Binnya Ran II's coronation ceremony at the Shwemawdaw Pagoda. The ceremony took over the course of two days (2 April to 3 April 1495). The dates of the two days as described in Pak Lat's original text are Thursday, the 9th waxing of Ashadha (Waso) 857 ME (Sunday, 31 May 1495), followed by the "next day" of Friday, the 11th waxing of Vaishakha (Kason) 857 ME (Friday, 3 April 1495). Both dates cannot be true since the first day is nearly a month later than the day that supposedly followed it. Furthermore, the first date translates to a Sunday (not Thursday), and thus is incorrect. The second date does translate to a Friday, and is likely correct.)

Queen	Rank	Issue	Reference
Agga Thiri Maya Dewi	Chief queen	unknown	
Maha Yaza Dewi	Senior queen	unknown	
Atula Dewi	Senior queen	unknown	
Yaza Dewi	Senior queen	unknown	

The king had at least three sons: Heir-apparent Yazadipati, Taka Yut Pi (Taka Rat Pi), and Smim Htaw.

== Historiography ==
Chronicles	Birth–Death	Age	Reign	Length of reign	Reference
Slapat Rajawan	c. 1446–1526/27	80 (81st year)	1491/92–1526/27	35	(Note: Schmidt's translation (Schmidt 1906: 141) mistakenly reports the length of king's reign as 45 years but the actual manuscript in Mon, as printed a page earlier (Schmidt 1906: 140), shows the length of reign as 35 years. According to (Schmidt 1906: 139–141), the king came to power in 853 ME (1491/92) in his 46th year (aged 45), and died in his 81st year (at age 80) in 888 ME (1526/27), having reigned for 35 years. Overall, the chronicle's age at death of 80 (meaning he was born c. 1446) is improbable since the king's father Dhammazedi was still a monk until c. 1458.)
Mon Yazawin (Shwe Naw)	1468/69–1526/27	57 (58th year)	1491/92–1526/27	35	(Note: (Shwe Naw 1922: 97–98, 104): He was born in 830 ME (1468/69) on a Tuesday; ascended the throne in his 23rd year (at age 22); reigned 35 years; and died in 888 ME (1526/27) in his 58th year (at age 57).)

== Bibliography ==
- Athwa, Sayadaw (1766). "Slapat des Ragawan der Königsgeschichte". Die äthiopischen Handschriften der K.K. Hofbibliothek zu Wien (in German). 151. Translated by P.W. Schmidt (1906 ed.). Vienna: Alfred Hölder.
- Aung-Thwin, Michael A. (2017). Myanmar in the Fifteenth Century. Honolulu: University of Hawai'i Press. ISBN 978-0-8248-6783-6.
- Fernquest, Jon (Autumn 2005). "Min-gyi-nyo, the Shan Invasions of Ava (1524–27), and the Beginnings of Expansionary Warfare in Toungoo Burma: 1486–1539" (PDF). SOAS Bulletin of Burma Research. 3 (2). Archived from the original (PDF) on 2016-03-03.
- Harvey, G. E. (1925). History of Burma: From the Earliest Times to 10 March 1824. London: Frank Cass & Co. Ltd.
- Shwe Naw, ed. (1785). Mon Yazawin (Shwe Naw) (in Burmese). Translated by Shwe Naw (1922 ed.). Yangon: Burma Publishing Workers Association Press.

Binnya Ran II Hanthawaddy Dynasty Born: 1469 Died: 1526
Regnal titles
Preceded by Dhammazedi	King of Hanthawaddy; 1492–1526	Succeeded by Takayutpi
Royal titles
Preceded by Dhammazedi	Heir to the Hanthawaddy Throne; 1483–1492	Succeeded by Yazadipati
