= Paulo de Seixas =

Paulo Seixas
- Born: Paulo de Seixas; Óbidos, Portugal
- Citizenship: Portuguese
- Occupation: Mercenary
- Known for: Battle of Martaban (1540–41)

Paulo de Seixas was a 16th-century Portuguese mercenary in the service of Saw Binnya, the viceroy of Martaban (Mottama). He is known for his leadership of Martaban's musket and artillery corps at the battle of Martaban (1540–41) against Toungoo Burma.

== Background ==
Though Seixas' land and naval troops, primarily made up of Portuguese and other foreign mercenaries, kept the besiegers at bay for seven months, Toungoo forces eventually broke through and the city was sacked.

According to the contemporary Portuguese explorer Fernão Mendes Pinto, Seixas had managed to escape with "a native woman", and the couple made it to the Coromandel Coast (Southeastern India) where they were married. He had brought with him two valuable bracelets, which he said were awarded to him by Saw Binnya in recognition of his faithful service. He sold the bracelets for 36,000 ducats. The dealers, according to Pinto, resold the bracelets to the ruler of Narsinga (Note: The ruler of Narsinga could have been Achyuta Deva Raya (r. 1529–1542), Venkata I (1542) or Sadasiva Raya (r. 1542–1569).) for 80,000 ducats.

== Bibliography ==
- Harvey, G. E. (1925). History of Burma: From the Earliest Times to 10 March 1824. London: Frank Cass & Co. Ltd.
- Ryley, John Horton (1899). Ralph Fitch, England's Pioneer to India and Burma: His Companions and Contemporaries, with His Remarkable Narrative Told in His Own Words. London: T. Fisher Unwin.
