= Smim Htaw =

Smim Htaw သမိန်ထော

King of Hanthawaddy
- Reign: August 1550 – 12 March 1552
- Predecessor: Smim Sawhtut
- Successor: End of dynasty
- Died: 27 March 1553; Sunday, 13th waxing of Tagu 935 ME; Pegu (Bago)
- Father: Binnya Ran II
- Religion: Theravada Buddhism

Smim Htaw (Burmese: သမိန်ထော, pronounced [θəmèiɰ̃ tʰɔ́]; died 27 March 1553) was a pretender to the Hanthawaddy throne, and the last king in the line of the Hanthawaddy dynasty. He ruled a small region around Pegu as king from 1550 to 1552.

== Resistance to Toungoo rule ==
An ex-Buddhist monk, and a son of King Binnya Ran II by a minor queen, Htaw first raised a rebellion in 1549 during the reign of King Tabinshwehti of Toungoo, who had conquered the Mon-speaking kingdom ten years earlier. Htaw was on the run in the delta chased after by Gen. Bayinnaung of Toungoo when Tabinshwehti was assassinated by one of his close advisers, Smim Sawhtut, on 30 April 1550. Sawhtut proclaimed himself king. Htaw seized Martaban in May, and raised an army to defeat Sawhtut near Pegu (Bago) in August 1550. Though proclaimed himself king at once, Htaw controlled just the region around Pegu.

His rule at Pegu lasted about a year and a half as Bayinnaung, the heir apparent under Tabinshwehti, came to attack Pegu in March 1552. North of the city, Toungoo and Peguan forces met. In desperation, Htaw challenged and fought Bayinnaung in single combat, both on their war elephants. Bayinnaung was victorious, charging his foe and driving him off after breaking the tusk of Htaw's elephant. Bayinnaung reportedly "paid Htaw no more heed than a lion does to jackals." Pegu was taken. Htaw was on the run for the next 12 months until he was captured in March 1553. He was brought to Pegu and executed on 27 March (13th waxing of Tagu 935 ME).

== Bibliography ==
- Harvey, G. E. (1925). History of Burma: From the Earliest Times to 10 March 1824. London: Frank Cass & Co. Ltd.
- Myint-U, Thant (2006). The River of Lost Footsteps—Histories of Burma. Farrar, Straus and Giroux. ISBN 978-0-374-16342-6.
- Phayre, Lt. Gen. Sir Arthur P. (1883). History of Burma (1967 ed.). London: Susil Gupta.
- Royal Historical Commission of Burma (1832). Hmannan Yazawin (in Burmese). Vol. 1–3 (2003 ed.). Yangon: Ministry of Information, Myanmar.

Smim Htaw Hanthawaddy Dynasty Died: March 1553
Regnal titles
Preceded by Smim Sawhtut	King of Hanthawaddy; August 1550 – 12 March 1552	Succeeded by End of Hanthawaddy Dynasty
