= Takayutpi =

Takayutpi တကာရွတ်ပိ

King of Hanthawaddy
- Reign: 1526–1539
- Predecessor: Binnya Ran II
- Successor: Smim Sawhtut
- Born: 1511; Pegu
- Died: 1539 (aged 27); Maubin
- Consort: Minkhaung Medaw
- Issue: ကွန်းဗ္လဲ Kaungbalay (daughter) was born from Minkhaung Medaw
- House: Wareru
- Father: Binnya Ran II
- Religion: Theravada Buddhism

Thushin Takayutpi (သုရှင်တကာရွတ်ပိ, pronounced [θṵʃɪ̀ɰ̃ dəɡàjʊʔpḭ], or Taka Yut Pi or Taka Rat Pi; 1511–1539), also called Patira Rāja (ပတိရရာဇာ) was king of Hanthawaddy Pegu from 1526 to 1539. At his accession, the 15-year-old inherited the most prosperous and powerful kingdom of all post-Pagan kingdoms. But he never had control of his vassals who scarcely acknowledged him. A dozen years later, due to the young king's inexperience and mismanagement, the Mon-speaking kingdom founded in 1287 fell to a smaller Toungoo.

== Brief ==
Taka Yut Pi was a son of King Binnya Ran II of Hanthawaddy. He was only 15 when he succeeded the throne. He ascended the throne three days after his father's death. The throne was first succeeded by the heir-apparent Prince Yazadipati at mid-morning but he died mysteriously in the same afternoon. Unlike his father, considered one of ablest kings of the coastal kingdom, the young king never took an interest in running the kingdom. He "never looked at a book; he gave himself up for sport in the woods with elephants and horses; he searched for shellfish and crabs; he was like one witless". He was not respected by his vassals. His brother-in-law Saw Binnya ruled the province of Martaban (Mottama) like a sovereign.

Takayutpi's weak leadership gave an opening to Toungoo's ambitious king Tabinshwehti and his deputy Gen. Bayinnaung. Beginning in 1534, Toungoo began annual dry-season raids into Hanthawaddy territory. Saw Binnya did not send any help to Takayutpi. Toungoo could not make headway against Pegu's fortified defenses led by two experienced ministers (Binnya Law and Binnya Kyan) and aided by foreign mercenaries with guns. By 1537, Peguan defenses had successfully repulsed Toungoo's three consecutive annual invasions. Unable to break Peguan defenses, Toungoo finally used a stratagem to create a split in the Hanthawaddy camp. Takayutpi foolishly believed Toungoo's misinformation about the loyalty of the two ministers, who had been his tutors since childhood and were absolutely devoted to him, and executed them.

When Toungoo again invaded in late 1538, Takayutpi, now without his best generals, lost heart and fled Pegu for Prome Kingdom (Pyay) where another brother-in-law of his, Narapati of Prome, was king. (He did not retreat to Martaban, which was nominally still part of Hanthawaddy because he did not trust its governor Saw Binnya.) Toungoo took the capital city of Pegu without firing a shot. On their flight to Prome, his demoralized forces, though far superior in numbers, were defeated by Bayinnaung's smaller but better disciplined forces at the Battle of Naungyo.

Having reached Prome with a decimated force, Takayutpi urged his allies– the king of Prome and the Confederation of Shan States– to restore him to his throne but they refused. Within the year, the king entered the Irrawaddy delta with a small armed band to collect war elephants. At Ingabin near Maubin he suddenly fell ill and died.

== Legacy ==
Takayutpi was the last Hanthawaddy king who had legitimate or nominal claim over the Lower Burma kingdom founded in 1287. After his death, Saw Binnya, who had been de facto independent since 1534, proclaimed himself king at Martaban. He was defeated and killed in 1541. After the death of Tabinshwehti in 1550, Smim Sawhtut and Smim Htaw proclaimed themselves as king. They never controlled any territory of significance, and were driven out by 1552.

== Bibliography ==
- Aung-Thwin, Michael A. (2017). Myanmar in the Fifteenth Century. Honolulu: University of Hawai'i Press. ISBN 978-0-8248-6783-6.
- Harvey, G. E. (1925). History of Burma: From the Earliest Times to 10 March 1824. London: Frank Cass & Co. Ltd.
- Htin Aung, Maung (1967). A History of Burma. New York and London: Cambridge University Press.
- Phayre, Lt. Gen. Sir Arthur P. (1883). History of Burma (1967 ed.). London: Susil Gupta.
- Royal Historical Commission of Burma (1832). Hmannan Yazawin (in Burmese). Vol. 1–3 (2003 ed.). Yangon: Ministry of Information, Myanmar.
- Sein Lwin Lay, Kahtika U (1968). Mintaya Shwe Hti and Bayinnaung: Ketumadi Taungoo Yazawin (in Burmese) (2006, 2nd printing ed.). Yangon: Yan Aung Sarpay.

Takayutpi Hanthawaddy Dynasty Born: 1511 Died: 1539
Regnal titles
Preceded by Binnya Ran II	King of Hanthawaddy; 1526–1539	Succeeded by Smim Sawhtut
