= Harry Leonard Shorto =

British philologist and linguist

Professor Harry Leonard Shorto
- Born: September 19, 1919
- Died: 30 July 1995 (aged 75)
- Citizenship: British
- Children: Roderick Shorto, Anna Shorto

Academic background
- Education: University of Cambridge

Academic work
- Discipline: Philologist, Linguist
- Institutions: SOAS University of London
- Main interests: Mon-Khmer; Mon language
- Notable works: Dictionary of Modern Spoken Mon (1962)

Harry Leonard Shorto (19 September 1919 – 30 July 1995) was a British philologist and linguist who specialized on the Mon language and Mon-Khmer studies. He authored both a modern Mon dictionary and a dictionary of Mon epigraphy. He worked for most of his career at the School of Oriental and African Studies, University of London, finally as Professor of Mon-Khmer Studies at the University of London (School of Oriental and African Studies) until his retirement in 1984.

== Life and career ==
Born in London, Shorto was educated at the Royal Masonic School for Boys in his youth before winning a full scholarship to attend St John's College, Cambridge at the age of 17. At St. John's he excelled in studies in both modern and medieval languages and was a rower for the university in The Boat Race. The onset of World War II interrupted his education, and he served first as a non-commissioned officer in the British Armed Forces as a specialist in artillery battery on the coast of North Norfolk. He became a commissioned officer with the rank of Major, and was stationed overseas in Burma working for British Intelligence. His time spent in Burma during WWII is what led to his interest in the Mon and Mon-Khmer languages.

After the war ended, Shorto returned to St John's College, Cambridge to complete his degree; graduating in the Spring of 1948. The following Fall 1948 he joined the faculty of the School of Oriental and African Studies at the University of London. There he taught courses in Austro-Asiatic and Austronesian families of languages in addition to being a lecturer in Mon in the Department of Languages and Culture of South East Asia and the Islands. In 1964 he was appointed as Reader and in 1971 he was made a Professor of Mon-Khmer studies. He retired from his post as professor in 1984.

== Contributions ==
Shorto is the author of two standard reference works, A Dictionary of Modern Spoken Mon (1962) and the highly respected author of the standard reference to epigraphic Mon - A Dictionary of the Mon Inscriptions (1971) - as well as the classic dictionary.

His magnum opus was the Mon-Khmer comparative dictionary, which was meant to be published in the early 1980s. It was rediscovered by his daughter Anna, and was published only in 2006. It presents 2,246 etymologies with almost 30,000 lexical citations. It is the most extensive analysis of Mon-Khmer to appear since Wilhelm Schmidt laid the foundations of comparative Mon-Khmer with the Grundzüge einer Lautlehre der Mon-Khmer-Sprachen (1905) and Die Mon-Khmer-Völker (1906). (For more information, see Proto-Austroasiatic language.)

== Works ==
- 1960. Word and syllable patterns in Palaung. Bulletin of the School of Oriental and African Studies 23:544-57.
- 1961. “A Mon Genealogy of Kings: Observations on the Nidana Arambhakatha,” In In D. G. E. Hall (ed.). Historians of South-East Asia, London: Oxford University Press, pp. 62–72.
- 1962. A Dictionary of Modern Spoken Mon.
- Shorto, H. L. (1963). The 32 myos in the medieval Mon kingdom. Bulletin of the School of Oriental and African Studies, 26(3), 572-591.
- 1963. The Structural pattern of northern Mon-Khmer languages. In H. L. Shorto (ed.), Linguistic Comparison in South-East Asia and the Pacific, pp. 45–61.
- 1963. Shorto, Harry L.; Jacob, Judith M. & Simmonds, E. H. S.. Bibliographies of Mon-Khmer and Tai linguistics. London.
- 1971. A Dictionary of the Mon Inscriptions from the sixth to the sixteenth centuries. London: Oxford University Press.
- 1972. “The word for ‘two’ in Austroasiatic.” Jacqueline M. C. Thomas & Lucien Bernot (eds.). Langues et techniques, nature et société, Vol. 1, “Approche linguistique”. Paris: Klincksieck. 233-35
- Shorto, H. L. (1973). Three Mon-Khmer word families. Bulletin of the School of Oriental and African Studies, 36(02), 374-381.
- Shorto, H. L. (1976). The vocalism of proto-Mon-Khmer. Oceanic Linguistics Special Publication, 1041-1067.
- Shorto, H. L. (1978). The Planets, the Days of the Week, and the Points of the Compass: Orientation Symbolism in Burma. Natural Symbols in South East Asia, 152-164.
- 2006. A Mon-Khmer comparative dictionary. Edited by Paul J. Sidwell, Doug Cooper, and Christian Bauer. (Pacific Linguistics) Canberra: Australian National University.
- Shorto, H. L. No Date. Nidana Ramadhipati-katha. Unpublished typescript translation of pp. 34–44, 61-264 of Phra Candakanto (editor). On binding Rajawamsa Dhammaceti Mahapitakadhara. Pak Lat, Siam (1912).

== See also ==
- Proto-Austroasiatic language
