= Natshinnaung =

King of Toungoo from 1609 to 1610

Natshinnaung နတ်သျှင်နောင်
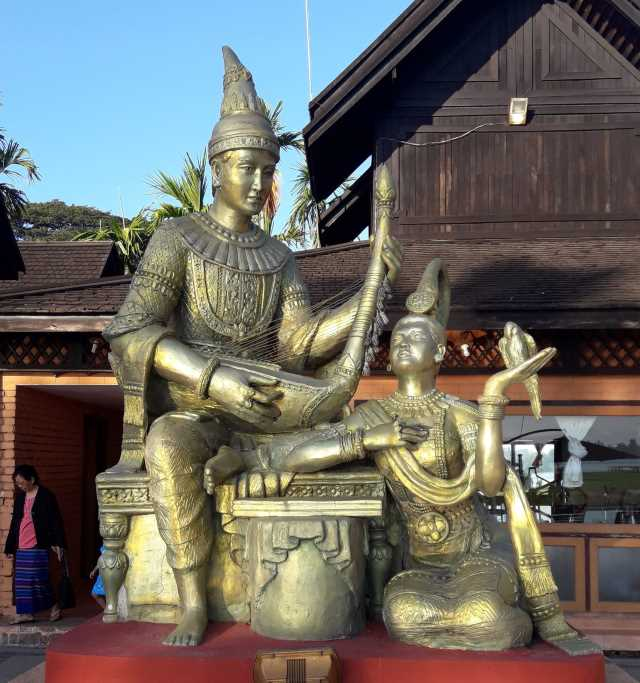
- Statue of Natshinnaung and Yaza Datu Kalaya in Taungoo

King of Toungoo
- Reign: 11 August [O.S. 1 August] 1609 – 4 September [O.S. 23 August] 1610
- Coronation: 21 August [O.S. 11 August] 1609; 6th waning of Wagaung 971 ME
- Predecessor: Minye Thihathu II
- Successor: (Abolished)
- Born: c. January 1579 (Note: He was born some time between December 1578 and February 1579. (Sein Lwin Lay 2006: 337): He was still 13 when the Burmese army marched off to Siam. Per (Hmannan Vol. 3 2003: 93), the army began the invasion on 5 December 1592 (2nd waxing of Natdaw 954). The army retreated after 8 February 1593 when Mingyi Swa was slain in single combat. Per (Htin Aung 1967: 137), he was 14 (in his 15th year) on the return trip. It means he had turned 14 during the invasion.); Toungoo (Taungoo)
- Died: 9 April [O.S. 30 March] 1613 (aged 34); Tuesday, 6th waning of Late Tagu 974 ME (Note: (Hmannan Vol. 3 2003: 169) says he was executed by impalement on Saturday, 3rd waning of Tagu 975 ME (6 April 1613). He died three days later per (Sein Lwin Lay 2006: 323).); Syriam (Thanlyin)
- Consort: Yaza Datu Kalaya; 5 concubines
- Issue: 9 children
Names
- Thiha Thura
- House: Toungoo
- Father: Minye Thihathu II
- Mother: Min Khin Saw

Natshinnaung (Burmese: နတ်သျှင်နောင်, [naʔ ʃɪ̀ɰ̃ nàʊɰ̃]; 1579–1613) was a Toungoo prince and poet known for leading a rebellion in Thanlyin (Syriam) alongside the Portuguese mercenary Filipe de Brito.

== Biography ==
A grandson of King Bayinnaung and the eldest son of Minye Thihathu, Viceroy of Toungoo, Natshinnaung participated in King Nanda Bayin's campaigns to reconquer Siam in the early 1590s, and took part in the sacking of Nanda's capital Pegu in 1599. On 21 March [O.S. 11 March] 1603, he married his lifelong love, Princess Yaza Datu Kalaya, for whom his famous poems were written. The marriage was cut short, however, as the princess died only seven months later.

When Natshinnaung succeeded his father on 11 August 1609, (Note: Chronicles (Maha Yazawin Vol. 3 2006: 108) and (Hmannan Vol. 3 2003: 114) say that Minye Thihathu died on Tuesday, 15th waxing of Wagaung 971 ME, which translates to Saturday, 15 August 1609. But 15th waxing is a typographical error. First, it is uncommon to state "15th waxing" instead of "full moon". Secondly, the chronicles say that Natshinnaung's coronation ceremony was held on Friday, 6th waning of Wagaung 971 ME, which translates to Friday, 21 August 1609. It means the last possible Tuesday in the waxing part of the month the king could have died on was 11th waxing, which was Tuesday, 11 August 1609 NS. The Burmese numerals 1 (၁) and 5 (၅) are similar when written in longhand.) much of the country had been reunited under the leadership of his cousin Anaukpetlun, who attacked Toungoo in 1610. Although Natshinnaung was made viceroy of Toungoo as the city surrendered on 4 September that same year (2nd waning of Tawthalin 972 ME), he was deeply dissatisfied with his reduced status and allied with Filipe de Brito to commence a counter-offensive that ultimately failed. Both were executed upon the fall of Thanlyin, de Brito's domain, to Anaukpetlun's forces.

== Family ==
Natshinnaung had six sons and three daughters from five concubines, but no children came from his marriage with Yaza Datu Kalaya.

Name	Mother	Brief
1. Minye Thing Thein	Min Nara Sit daughter of Minye Narathu	Son married to his half-sister Khin Nè Gyi
2. Khin Nè Gyi	Khin Lat daughter of a younger sister of Ne Myo Kyawhtin's wife	Daughter married to her half-brother Minye Thing Thein
3. Minye Nara	Khin Lat daughter of a younger sister of Ne Myo Kyawhtin's wife	Son
4. Minye Thiha	Khin Lat daughter of a younger sister of Ne Myo Kyawhtin's wife	Son
5. Khin Myat Theik	Khin Mya Nè daughter of Theik Taw Shi	Daughter married to Mintha Thing Thikyawsan Gov.of Myinsaing son of Nanda Bayin
6. Ne Myo Khaing	Khin Mya Nè daughter of Theik Taw Shi	Daughter
7. Minye Hpone Khaing	Khin Mya Nè daughter of Theik Taw Shi	Son
8. Mintha Phyu	Khin Myo Taw	Son
9. Minye Kyawswa	Wezayantha	Son

== Poet ==
Natshinnaung is considered by many to be the greatest yadu (Burmese: ရတု) (a classical genre of poetry) poet in Burmese history. Many of his works are dedicated to Princess Yaza Datu Kalyani. The themes of his poetry were often love, nature, and war. Natshinnaung employed the use of vocabulary and rhymes in his works. In addition, he was a warrior, who advanced many military strategies and tactics of Burma. Some of his yadu poems describe the infantry and the elephant troops. It has been claimed that Natshinnaung sent his poems to Yaza Datu Kalyani using a parrot.

Later in life, Natshinnaung focused on obtaining power for his kingdom. His poems on war are said to have been based on his experiences as a young prince.

== Bibliography ==
- Htin Aung, Maung (1967). A History of Burma. New York and London: Cambridge University Press.
- Myint-U, Thant (2006). The River of Lost Footsteps—Histories of Burma. Farrar, Straus and Giroux. ISBN 978-0-374-16342-6.
- Royal Historical Commission of Burma (1829–1832). Hmannan Yazawin (in Burmese). Vol. 1–3 (2003 ed.). Yangon: Ministry of Information, Myanmar.
- Sein Lwin Lay, Kahtika U (2006). Mintaya Shwe Hti and Bayinnaung: Ketumadi Taungoo Yazawin (in Burmese) (2nd printing ed.). Yangon: Yan Aung Sarpay.

Natshinnaung Toungoo Dynasty Born: c. January 1579 Died: 9 April 1613
Regnal titles
Preceded by Minye Thihathu II	King of Toungoo; 11 August 1609 – 4 September 1610	Succeeded by Abolished
Royal titles
Preceded by Minye Thihathu II	Heir to the Toungoo Throne; 21 March 1603 – 11 August 1609	Succeeded by Abolished
