= Thiri Thudhamma Yaza of Martaban =

Thiri Thudhamma Yaza သီရိ သုဓမ္မ ရာဇာ

Viceroy of Martaban
- Reign: 26 May 1581 – 3 May 1584
- Predecessor: Minye Nandameit
- Successor: Unnamed
- Born: 8 April 1561; Tuesday, 9th waning of Tagu 923 ME (Note: (Maha Yazawin Vol. 2 2006: 260): Tuesday, 9th waning of Tagu 923 ME = 8 April 1561. In a copying error, the chronicle Hmannan Yazawin (Hmannan Vol. 2 2003: 338) reports the birth date as Tuesday, 6th waning of Tagu 923 ME, which translates to Saturday, 5 April 1561. Burmese numerals ၆ (6) and ၉ (9) can be similar when written longhand.); Pegu (Bago); Toungoo Empire
- Died: c. May 1584
- House: Toungoo
- Father: Bayinnaung
- Mother: Yaza Dewi
- Religion: Theravada Buddhism

Thiri Thudhamma Yaza (Burmese: သီရိ သုဓမ္မ ရာဇာ, pronounced [θìɹḭ θṵdəma̰ jàzà], Pali: Sīrisudhammarājā; 8 April 1561 – c. May 1584) was viceroy of Martaban (Mottama) from 1581 to 1584. He was the younger brother of King Nawrahta Minsaw of Lan Na and Princess Yaza Datu Kalaya.

== Brief ==
The future viceroy was born Thinga Dathta (သင်္ဃာ ဒတ္ထ, [θɪ̀ɴgà daʔtʰa̰]) to Queen Yaza Dewi and King Bayinnaung of Toungoo Dynasty on 8 April 1561 at the Kanbawzathadi Palace. The youngest of the king's six children by his three principal queens grew up at the palace. He had his royal hair-knotting ceremony on 20 October 1577. (Note: (Maha Yazawin Vol. 3 2006: 63): Friday, 9th waxing of Tazaungmon 939 ME = Sunday, 20 October 1577.)

He commanded a regiment in the 1579–80 campaign to Lan Xang under the overall commander-in-chief Nanda. The 22,000-strong army saw no action there.

He was appointed viceroy of Martaban (Mottama) with the style of Thiri Thudhamma Yaza on 26 May 1581. The new viceroy was asked to co-lead, along with Minye Kyawhtin, (Note: (Maha Yazawin Vol. 3 2006: 83): Minye Kyawhtin became the viceroy of Toungoo with the title of Minye Thihathu in June 1584.) the ongoing war with Arakan. On 28 September 1581, (Note: (Maha Yazawin Vol. 3 2006: 74) and (Hmannan Vol. 3 2003: 60): Monday, 1st waxing of Thadingyut 943 ME, which translates to Thursday, 28 September 1581.) his army of 18,000 men, 800 horses, 60 elephants left Pegu for Arakan. (Minye Kyawhtin led an 11,000-strong army.) But neither man saw any action. The king died six weeks later, and the new king Nanda called off the invasion.

It was the last time he was explicitly mentioned by name in the Burmese chronicles. In May 1584, Martaban was under occupation of Crown Prince Naresuan of Siam, who returned to Siam by taking away many conscripts to Siam. The viceroy might have been taken away or killed. Pegu's forces reoccupied Martaban in the same year but the viceroy's name or the term "viceroy of Martaban" (မုတ္တမ မင်းကြီး) (Note: For example, he is referred to as "မုတ္တမ မင်းကြီး" in (Maha Yazawin Vol. 3 74).) never came up again. Although three of the five Burmese invasions of Siam (1584–1593) went through Martaban, neither his name nor the ruler of Martaban is ever mentioned in any of the commander lists of the campaigns. When the ruler of the Martaban is mentioned in the Siam's 1592 raid into Martaban's territory, he is referred to as governor of Martaban (မုတ္တမ မြို့စား).

== Bibliography ==
- Kala, U (1724). Maha Yazawin (in Burmese). Vol. 1–3 (2006, 4th printing ed.). Yangon: Ya-Pyei Publishing.
- Royal Historical Commission of Burma (1832). Hmannan Yazawin (in Burmese). Vol. 1–3 (2003 ed.). Yangon: Ministry of Information, Myanmar.

Thiri Thudhamma Yaza of Martaban Toungoo Dynasty Born: 8 April 1561 Died: 3 May 1584
Royal titles
Preceded by Minye Nandameit	Viceroy of Martaban; 26 May 1581 – 3 May 1584	Succeeded by Unnamed
