= Yaza Datu Kalaya =

Yaza Datu Kalaya ရာဇ ဓာတု ကလျာ
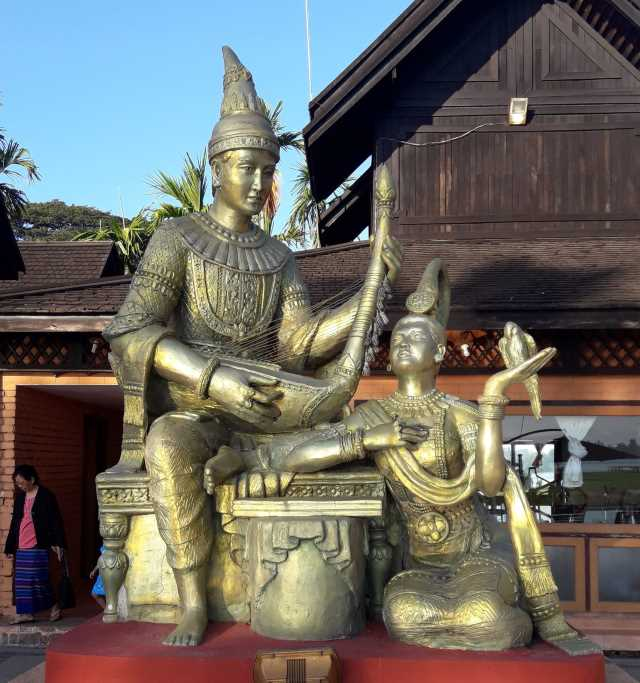
- Statue of Natshinnaung and Yaza Datu Kalaya in Taungoo

Princess consort of Toungoo
- Tenure: 21 March [O.S. 11 March] 1603 – November 1603
- Coronation: 21 March [O.S. 11 March] 1603
- Predecessor: Min Khin Saw
- Successor: unknown

Princess consort of Burma
- Tenure: c. November 1586 – 8 February [O.S. 29 January] 1593
- Predecessor: Natshin Medaw
- Successor: unknown
- Born: 12 November 1559; Sunday, 14th waxing of Natdaw 921 ME; Pegu (Bago); Toungoo Empire
- Died: November 1603; Tazaungmon 965 ME (aged ~44); Toungoo (Taungoo)
- Spouse: Mingyi Swa (1586–1593, his death); Natshinnaung (1603)
- Issue: None
- House: Toungoo
- Father: Bayinnaung
- Mother: Yaza Dewi aka Htwe Hla
- Religion: Theravada Buddhism

Yaza Datu Kalaya (Burmese: ရာဇ ဓာတု ကလျာ, pronounced [jàza̰ dàdṵ kələjà], Pali: Rājadhātukalyā; also spelled Yaza Datu Kalya; 12 November 1559 – November 1603) was crown princess of Burma from 1586 to 1593, and crown princess of Toungoo for seven months in 1603. Known for her great beauty, the princess was also a noted poet, and the subject of some of the "most beautiful poems in Burmese literature" by Natshinnaung.

== Early life ==
The princess was born on 12 November 1559 to Queen Yaza Dewi and King Bayinnaung of Toungoo in Pegu (Bago). She was named Yaza Datu Kalaya because she was born on the day when the relic chamber of the Mahazedi Pagoda in Bago was dedicated for the first time. (Note: The donated materials to a Buddhist stupa's relic chamber, often gold, silver, jewelry, precious stones, and Buddha statues, were called Dat-taw (ဓာတ်တော်) of which dat is derived from Dhātu in Pali, which means physical elements per (Rhys Davids, Stede 1993: 340). Kalaya (ကလျာ) is a Burmese form of Pali Kalyāna, which means "beautiful, charming, auspicious, morally good" per (Rhys Davids, Stede 1993: 199).) From her mother's side, she was descended from the Ava royal line. She had two full siblings: an elder brother Nawrahta Minsaw and a younger brother Thiri Thudhamma Yaza. The three children grew up at the Kanbawzathadi Palace in Pegu, and they officially became part of the most senior royalty in March 1563 when their mother was elevated to the king's third (and last) principal queen.

The princess was educated at the palace. She was interested in poetry (and later became a noted poet). At 15, she had her ear-piercing ceremony on 27 February 1574.

== Crown Princess of Burma (1586–1593) ==
According to the chronicles, the princess grew up to be a great beauty. The princess nonetheless remained unmarried into her twenties, although she was pursued by many senior princes, including Mingyi Swa, her already married half-nephew and the heir-apparent of the kingdom. In 1583, Mingyi Swa's wife, Natshin Medaw, complained to her parents that Mingyi Swa spent much time pursuing Yaza Datu Kalaya. Her complaints contributed to a fallout between her parents Viceroy Thado Minsaw of Ava and Inwa Mibaya and Mingyi Swa's father King Nanda, which led to a rebellion by Thado Minsaw in 1584.

Protected by her half-brother Nanda, Yaza Datu Kalaya continued to spurn Mingyi Swa's advances. But in October 1586, Nanda left Pegu with the army for his regime's third invasion of Siam. Mingyi Swa was left to guard the capital. With Nanda gone, Mingyi Swa raised the princess to be his queen and formally divorced Natshin Medaw in the process. Nanda arrived back in Pegu in June 1587 from a failed campaign, and the king was extremely unhappy to learn of the news of what had happened while he was away.

In all, she was Mingyi Swa's chief queen for about six years. She became a widow on 8 February [O.S. 29 January] 1593 when Mingyi Swa died in action in Siam. She learned of the news a month later when the defeated army brought back the body of the fallen crown-prince to Pegu.

== Princess dowager (1593–1603) ==
Yaza Datu Kalaya would lead the next ten years of her life as the princess dowager, although she was never far from advances by other men. Her most famous suitor was one Natshinnaung who first met her at the cremation ceremony of Mingyi Swa in front of the Kanbawzathadi Palace. The 14-year-old prince from Toungoo (Taungoo) had gone to the front with Mingyi Swa, and was one of the men who personally brought back the body. As the budding poet sang the praises of the dead hero, he watched "her eyes growing dim with sadness, and then sparkling with pride at the glorious death of her husband."

From then on, the princess became the young prince's object of obsession. She was 19 years his senior, and his aunt—half cousin, once removed. (Both his parents were her half-cousins.) For the next three years, he wrote poem after poem, declaring his love for her until she, a poet herself, finally returned his love. King Nanda, however, refused to permit the marriage because of the disparity in ages. The marriage became totally out of the question in 1597 when Natshinnaung's father Minye Thihathu II of Toungoo declared independence. Natshinnaung, now 18, was deeply hurt and became "obsessed with one idea only": marrying his love and making the lady queen of Burma. He continued writing love and philosophical poems, which are "generally considered to be the most beautiful poems in Burmese literature."

On 19 December [O.S. 9 December] 1599, King Nanda surrendered to the combined forces of Toungoo and Arakan. Yaza Datu Kalaya, along with other Pegu royalty, was brought back to the Toungoo Palace. At Toungoo, Minye Thihathu II himself was resistant to the idea of his son marrying his half-cousin. For Natshinnaung, it was too much to take. Convinced that Nanda was still behind his father's refusal, Natshinnaung assassinated the fallen king on 30 November [O.S. 20 November] 1600. Minye Thihathu was extremely displeased with his son's action, and ordered a respectful cremation ceremony for his cousin.

== Crown princess of Toungoo (1603) ==
At any rate, Minye Thihathu finally relented, and Natshinnaung finally got his wish in 1603. At Natshinnaung's coronation ceremony as the crown prince of Toungoo on 21 March [O.S. 11 March] 1603, Natshinnaung and Yaza Datu Kalaya were married. But she died just over seven months later in November 1603.

== In popular culture ==
She was portrayed as a character in Thai television drama The Legend of King Naresuan: The Series season 3 Portrayed by Slita Klinchan; Thai television drama The Last Duel (หงสาวดี) (2026) Portrayed Varitthisa Limthammahisorn.

== Bibliography ==
- Htin Aung, Maung (1967). A History of Burma. New York and London: Cambridge University Press.
- Kala, U (1724). Maha Yazawin (in Burmese). Vol. 1–3 (2006, 4th printing ed.). Yangon: Ya-Pyei Publishing.
- Ohn Shwe, U; Natshinnaung (1920). Natshinnaung Yadu Collection (in Burmese) (1966, 3rd printing ed.). Yangon: Hanthawaddy.
- Rhys Davids, Thomas William; William Stede (1993). Pali–English Dictionary (reprint ed.). Delhi: Motilal Banarsidass. ISBN 9788120811447.
- Royal Historical Commission of Burma (1832). Hmannan Yazawin (in Burmese). Vol. 1–3 (2003 ed.). Yangon: Ministry of Information, Myanmar.

Yaza Datu Kalaya Toungoo Dynasty Born: 12 November 1559 Died: November 1603
Royal titles
Preceded by Min Khin Saw	Princess consort of Toungoo; 21 March 1603 – November 1603	Unknown
Preceded by Natshin Medaw	Princess consort of Burma c. November 1586 – 8 February 1593	Unknown
