= Min Khin Saw =

Atula Agga Maha Dewi Min Khin Saw အတုလအဂ္ဂ မဟာဒေဝီ မင်းခင်စော

Chief queen consort of Toungoo State
- Tenure: c. February 1597 – 11 August 1609
- Coronation: 21 March [O.S. 11 March] 1603
- Predecessor: new office
- Successor: vacant (Note: (Maha Yazawin Vol. 3 2006: 148): Natshinnaung did not have a queen after the death of Yaza Datu Kalaya. He did not raise any of his concubines to queen. And since Natshinnaung was the last sovereign king of Toungoo, the office of Chief Queen of Toungoo ended with Min Khin Saw.)

Chief vicereine of Toungoo
- Tenure: June 1584 – c. February 1597
- Predecessor: Laygyun Mibaya
- Successor: disestablished
- Born: c. 1555 (Note: Sanda Dewi became Bayinnaung's queen only in April 1553. Since she got married in 1570, she was likely born in the mid 1550s.); Pegu (Bago); Toungoo Empire
- Died: after August 1612; Pinya; Restored Toungoo Kingdom
- Spouse: Minye Thihathu II
- Issue: Natshinnaung; Minye Kyawswa of Toungoo; Minye Thihathu III of Toungoo; Minye Kyawhtin II of Toungoo
- House: Toungoo
- Father: Bayinnaung
- Mother: Sanda Dewi
- Religion: Theravada Buddhism

Min Khin Saw (Burmese: မင်းခင်စော, pronounced [mɪ́ɴ kʰɪ̀ɴ sɔ́]) was the chief queen consort of the break-away kingdom of Toungoo (Taungoo) from 1597 to 1609. She was also the chief queen of Toungoo from 1584 to 1597 when Toungoo was a vassal state of Toungoo Empire. From 1612 onwards, the mother of Natshinnaung spent her last years as a dowager queen in Pinya (near Ava (Inwa).

== Brief ==
Min Khin Saw was the only child born from the union of Queen Sanda Dewi and King Bayinnaung. She descended from the Ava royal line from her mother's side. She married her half-cousin Minye Kyawhtin, governor of Tharrawaddy (Thayawadi), on 1 May 1571.

The couple had four children:

- Natshinnaung, King of Toungoo (1609–1610); Viceroy of Toungoo (1610–1612)
- Minye Kyawswa of Toungoo, Crown Prince of Toungoo (1609–1612)
- Minye Thihathu III of Toungoo, Governor of Badon (1612–?)
- Minye Kyawhtin II of Toungoo, Governor of Taungdwingyi (1612–?)

Min Khin Saw became a dowager queen in 1609 when her husband died. She fled Toungoo in August 1612 (Note: (Maha Yazawin Vol. 3 2006: 144): Wagaung 974 ME = 28 July to 25 August 1612) when the combined forces of Portuguese Syriam (Thanlyin) and Martaban (Mottama) attacked Toungoo. King Anaukpetlun gave her a two-story house in Pinya (near Ava) with a retinue of servants.

== In popular culture ==
She was portrayed by Ratchanee Siralert in the 2003 Thai television drama Kasattriya (กษัตริยา), under the name Chao Nang Nanthavadi. and The Legend of King Naresuan Part VI in 2015 portrayed by Ratchanee Siralert Once again.

== Ancestry ==
Ancestry of Queen Min Khin Saw

8. Taungkha Min
4. Minye Thihathu I of Toungoo
9. Kayenawaddy
2. Bayinnaung
10. Kywe Sit Min
5. Shin Myo Myat
11. (Unnamed)
1. Min Khin Saw
12. Minkhaung II of Ava
6. Narapati II of Ava
13. Atula Thiri Dhamma Dewi of Ava
3. Sanda Dewi
14. Thihapate of Pakhan
7. Dhamma Dewi of Pakhan
15. (Unnamed)

== Bibliography ==
- Kala, U (1724). Maha Yazawin (in Burmese). Vol. 1–3 (2006, 4th printing ed.). Yangon: Ya-Pyei Publishing.

Min Khin Saw Toungoo Dynasty Born: c. 1555 Died: 1610s?
Royal titles
New title	Chief queen consort of Toungoo State c. February 1597 – 11 August 1609	Vacant
