= Yaza Dewi of Pegu =

Yaza Dewi ရာဇဒေဝီ

Queen of the Central Palace
- Tenure: 17 March 1563 – 13 September 1564
- Predecessor: Yadana Dewi
- Successor: Min Htwe
- Born: c. 1530s Dabayin
- Died: 13 September 1564; Wednesday, 9th waxing of Thadingyut 926 ME; Pegu (Bago)
- Spouse: Bayinnaung
- Issue: Nawrahta Minsaw; Yaza Datu Kalaya; Thiri Thudhamma Yaza
Names
- Birth name: Htwe Hla
- Father: Gamani of Dabayin
- Religion: Theravada Buddhism

Yaza Dewi (Burmese: ရာဇဒေဝီ, pronounced [jàza̰ dèwì]; Pali: Rājadevī) was a principal queen consort of King Bayinnaung of Burma. She was the mother of King Nawrahta Minsaw of Lan Na, Queen Yaza Datu Kalaya of Toungoo and Thiri Thudhamma Yaza, Viceroy of Martaban. She was a niece of King Narapati II of Ava. She was a minor queen of King Bayinnaung but was elevated to be his third principal queen on 17 March 1563. She died a year and a half later.

== In popular culture ==
She is featured in the 1932 Thai novel Phu Chana Sip Thit (Conqueror of the Ten Directions) under the name Tala Mae Kusuma. The novel has been adapted into television dramas numerous times, and she has subsequently been portrayed numerous times, including in 1958 by Songshri Thevagup, in 1961 by Savalee Pakapan, in 1971 by Thiwaporn Kanchanarom, in 1980 by Kanokwan Danudom, in 1983 by Pinjai Pommalee, in 1989 by Sinjai Plengpanich, and most recently in 2013 by Vanessa Herrmann. She was also portrayed in the 2003 Thai television drama Kasattriya (กษัตริยา) under the name Chao Nang Cheng Devi, portrayed by Nuanprang Trichit, and appeared in the 2007 King Naresuan film series, seated next to King Bayinnaung.

== Bibliography ==
- Royal Historical Commission of Burma (1832). Hmannan Yazawin (in Burmese). Vol. 1–3 (2003 ed.). Yangon: Ministry of Information, Myanmar.

Yaza Dewi of Pegu Toungoo Dynasty Born: c. 1530s Died: 13 September 1564
Royal titles
Preceded by Yadana Dewi	Queen of the Central Palace; 17 March 1563 – 13 September 1564	Succeeded by Min Htwe
