= Bayinnaung =

Emperor of the Toungoo dynasty

Bayinnaung; ဘုရင့်နောင်
- Emperor of Toungoo
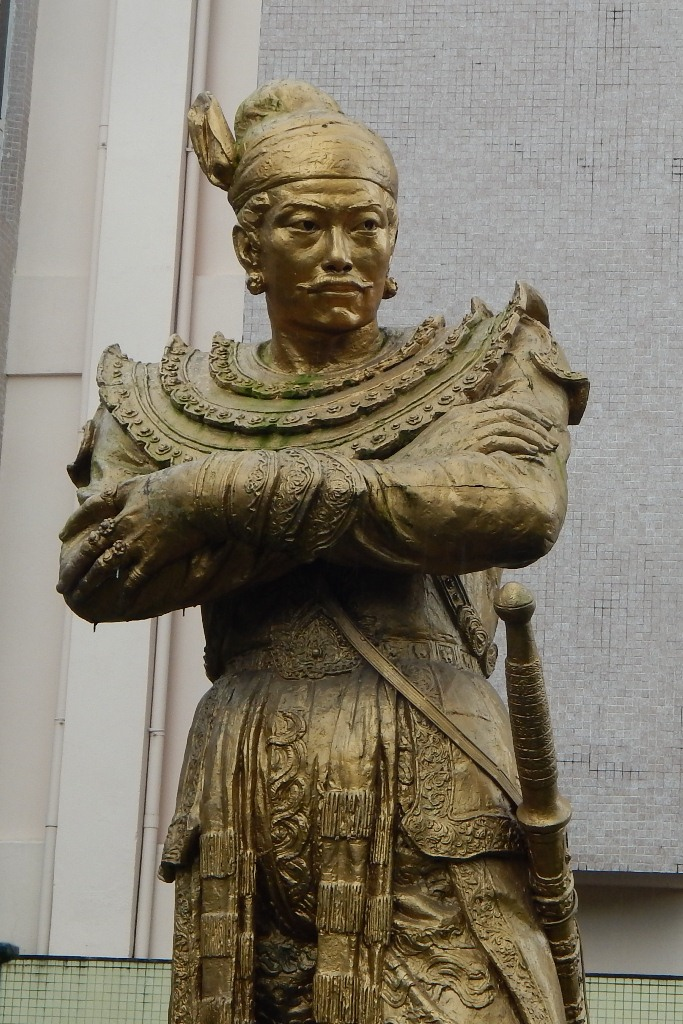
- Statue of Bayinnaung in front of the National Museum of Myanmar

King of Burma: Hanthawaddy (1552–1581); Ava (1555–1581); Shan States (1557–1581); Manipur (1560–1581); Chinese Shan States (1562–1581)
- Reign: 30 April 1550 – 10 October 1581
- Coronation: 11 January 1551 at Toungoo; 12 January 1554 at Pegu
- Predecessor: Tabinshwehti
- Successor: Nanda Bayin
- Chief Minister: Binnya Dala (1559–1573)

Suzerain of Lan Na
- Reign: 2 April 1558 – 10 October 1581
- Predecessor: New office
- Successor: Nanda Bayin
- King: Mekuti (1558–1563); Visuddhadevi (1565–1579); Nawrahta Minsaw (1579–1581)

Suzerain of Siam
- Reign: 18 February 1564 – 10 October 1581
- Predecessor: New office
- Successor: Nanda Bayin
- King: Mahinthrathirat (1564–1568); Maha Thammaracha (1569–1581)

Suzerain of Lan Xang
- Reign: 2 January 1565 – c. January 1568; February 1570 – early 1572; 6 December 1574 – 10 October 1581
- Predecessor: New office
- Successor: Nanda Bayin
- King: Maing Pat Sawbwa (1565–1568, 1570–1572); Maha Ouparat (1574–1581)
- Born: Ye Htut: 16 January 1516; Wednesday, 12th waxing of Tabodwe 877 ME; Toungoo
- Died: 10 October 1581 (aged 65); Tuesday, Full moon of Tazaungmon 943 ME; Pegu
- Burial: 15 October 1581; Kanbawzathadi Palace
- Consort: Atula Thiri; Sanda Dewi; Yaza Dewi
- Issue among others: Inwa Mibaya; Nanda Bayin; Nawrahta Minsaw; Nyaungyan Min; Min Khin Saw; Yaza Datu Kalaya; Thiri Thudhamma Yaza
Regnal name
- Sīri Tribhuvanāditya Pavara Paṇḍita Sudhammarājā Mahādhipati သီရိ တြိဘု၀နာဒိတျ ပ၀ရ ပဏ္ဍိတ သုဓမ္မရာဇာ မဟာဓိပတိ Sīri pavara Mahādhammarājādhirāja သီရိ ပဝရ မဟာဓမ္မရာဇာဓိရာဇ
- House: Toungoo
- Father: Mingyi Swe
- Mother: Shin Myo Myat
- Religion: Buddhist

Bayinnaung Kyawhtin Nawrahta (Burmese: ဘုရင့်နောင် ကျော်ထင်နော်ရထာ; (Note: [bəjɪ̰ɰ̃ nàʊɰ̃ tɕɔ̀ tʰɪ̀ɰ̃ nɔ̀jətʰà],) Thai: บุเรงนองกะยอดินนรธา; (Note: RTGS: Burengnong Kayodin Noratha,) 16 January 1516 – 10 October 1581) was King of Burma from 30 April 1550 until his death in 1581, during the Toungoo dynasty. His reign is considered one of the most momentous in Burmese history, famously described as "the greatest explosion of human energy ever seen in Burma". During his rule, he assembled the largest empire in Southeast Asian history, which encompassed much of present-day Myanmar, as well as the Shan States, Lan Na, Lan Xang, Manipur, and the Ayutthaya Kingdom.

Though best remembered for his empire-building, Bayinnaung's most enduring legacy was the integration of the Shan States into the Irrawaddy valley administrative system. After conquering the Shan States between 1557 and 1563, he implemented a series of administrative reforms aimed at reducing the power of hereditary rulers, known as saophas, and aligning Shan governance and customs with lowland Burmese norms. These reforms effectively eliminated the persistent threat of Shan raids into Upper Burma, a source of instability since the 13th century. Bayinnaung's integration policy served as a model for successive Burmese monarchs, who continued his approach until 1885.

However, Bayinnaung largely followed the prevailing Mandala administrative model across his vast and culturally diverse empire. His rule over the First Toungoo Empire was described as "an emperor without an empire" holding control through personal allegiance to Bayinnaung as a Chakravartin (Universal Monarch) from it sub-kingdoms, rather than to any institutions. While this loyalty endured during his lifetime, it rapidly unraveled after his death in 1581. Both the kingdoms of Ava and Ayutthaya revolted within just over two years, and by 1599, all vassal states had declared independence, resulting in the complete collapse of the empire.

Bayinnaung is regarded as one of the three greatest Burmese monarchs and is commemorated with major landmarks in his name in modern Myanmar. He is also well known in Thailand, where he is remembered as "Conqueror of the Ten Directions". Despite being a former adversary of Ayutthaya, his influence in Thai historical consciousness stands as a testament to the scale and power of his reign.

== Early life ==
=== Ancestry ===
The future king Bayinnaung was born Ye Htut (ရဲထွတ်, IPA: [jɛ́ tʰʊʔ]) on 16 January 1516 to Mingyi Swe and Shin Myo Myat. His exact ancestry is unclear. No extant contemporary records, including Hanthawaddy Hsinbyushin Ayedawbon, the extensive chronicle of the king's reign written two years before his death, mention his ancestry. It was only in 1724, some 143 years after the king's death, that Maha Yazawin, the official chronicle of the Taungoo Dynasty, first proclaimed his genealogy.

According to Maha Yazawin, he was born to a gentry family in Toungoo (Taungoo), then a former vassal state of the Ava Kingdom. He was descended from viceroys of Toungoo Tarabya (r. 1440–1446) and Minkhaung I (r. 1446–1451) on his father's side; and from King Thihathu of Pinya (r. 1310–1325) and his chief queen Mi Saw U of the Pagan Dynasty on his mother's side. Furthermore, Ye Htut was distantly related to then presiding ruler of Toungoo Mingyi Nyo and his son Tabinshwehti through their common ancestor, Tarabya I of Pakhan. (Note: (Hmannan Vol. 2 2003: 171): Mingyi Nyo's maternal grandmother Min Hla Htut, Princess of Pyakaung, was a daughter of Minye Kyawswa and Saw Min Hla, daughter of Tarabya of Pakhan.) Later chronicles simply repeat Maha Yazawin's account. In all, the chronicles (perhaps too) neatly tie his ancestry to all the previous main dynasties that existed in Upper Burma: the Ava, Sagaing, Myinsaing–Pinya and Pagan dynasties.

Family tree of King Bayinnaung according to Maha Yazawin

Tarabya I of Pakhan d. c. 1433	Minkhaung I of Ava; 1373–1421 r. 1400–1421	Shin Mi-Nauk of Mohnyin b. 1374	Thihathu of Pinya; 1265–1325 r. 1310–1325	Mi Saw U of Pagan
Tarabya of Toungoo d. 1446	Saw Min Hla	Minye Kyawswa; 1391–1415	Nawrahta of Kanni b. c. 1300s	Uzana I of Pinya; 1298–1356 r. 1325–1340	Kyawswa I of Pinya; 1299–1350 r. 1344–1350
Minkhaung I of Toungoo d. 1452	Thettawshay of Dabayin
Unnamed	Thray Ponnya
Kayenawaddy	Taungkha Min	Kywe Sit Min
Mingyi Swe c. 1490s–1549	Shin Myo Myat c. 1490s–1520s
Bayinnaung; 1516–1581 r. 1550–1581

Despite the official version of royal descent, oral traditions speak of a decidedly less grandiose genealogy: that his parents were commoners from Ngathayauk in Pagan district or Htihlaing village in Toungoo district, and that his father was a toddy palm tree climber, then one of the lowest professions in Burmese society. The commoner origin narrative first gained prominence in the early 20th century during the British colonial period as nationalist writers like Po Kya promoted it as proof that even a son of a toddy tree climber could rise to become the great emperor in Burmese society. To be sure, the chronicle and oral traditions need not be mutually exclusive, since being a toddy tree climber does not preclude his having royal ancestors. (Note: (Harvey 1925: 342): While "the family trees sported by men after they attain greatness must be suspect", Swe being "a toddy climber no more precludes the possibility of his having royal ancestors than it precluded his becoming vassal king of Toungoo when his son rose to greatness".)

=== Childhood and education ===
Whatever their origin and station in life may have been, both of his parents were chosen to be part of the seven-person staff to take care of the royal baby Tabinshwehti in April 1516. Ye Htut's mother was chosen to be the wet nurse of the prince and heir apparent. The family moved into the Toungoo Palace precincts, where the couple had three more sons, the last of whom died young. Ye Htut had an elder sister Khin Hpone Soe, and three younger brothers: Minye Sithu, Thado Dhamma Yaza II, and the youngest who died young. He also had two half-brothers, Minkhaung II and Thado Minsaw, who were born to his aunt (his mother's younger sister) and his father.

Ye Htut grew up playing with the prince and the king's other children, including Princess Thakin Gyi, who would later become his chief queen. He was educated in the palace along with the prince and the other children. King Mingyi Nyo required his son to receive an education in military arts. Tabinshwehti along with Ye Htut and other young men at the palace received training in martial arts, horseback riding, elephant riding, and military strategy. Ye Htut became the prince's right-hand man.

== Deputy of Tabinshwehti ==
=== Rise to power ===
On 24 November 1530, Mingyi Nyo died and Tabinshwehti ascended the throne. The 14-year-old new king took Ye Htut's elder sister Khin Hpone Soe as one of his two principal queens, and rewarded his childhood staff and friends with royal titles and positions. Ye Htut, already a close confidant of the new king, instantly became a powerful figure in the kingdom which was surrounded by increasingly hostile states. In the north, the Confederation of Shan States had conquered the Ava Kingdom just three and a half years earlier. To the west was the Confederation's ally the Prome Kingdom. To the south lay the Hanthawaddy kingdom, the wealthiest and most powerful of all post-Pagan kingdoms. The impending threat became more urgent after the Confederation defeated its former ally Prome in 1532–1533. Tabinshwehti and the Toungoo leadership concluded that their kingdom "had to act quickly if it wished to avoid being swallowed up" by the Confederation.

It was during the kingdom's mobilizations that Ye Htut made his mark, and was noticed for "his deeds of valor and strength of character". Ye Htut was by the king's side in 1532 when the king and his 500 most skillful horsemen made an uninvited foray into the Shwemawdaw Pagoda at the outskirts of Pegu, the capital of Hanthawaddy, ostensibly for the king's ear-piercing ceremony. The audacious intrusion went unpunished by Hanthawaddy's weak ruler, King Takayutpi. Ye Htut became the constant companion and adviser to the young king.

However, the close relationship between the two was severely tested in 1534, as they prepared for war against Hanthawaddy. Ye Htut had become romantically involved with Thakin Gyi, the king's younger half-sister, and the affair was discovered around April 1534. (Note: Chronicles (Maha Yazawin Vol. 3 2006: 75) and (Hmannan Vol. 3 2003: 61) only give 896 ME (29 March 1534 to 29 March 1535) for the date of the marriage between Bayinnaung and Thakin Gyi (Atula Thiri). But they must have got married in early 896 ME around April 1534 since the couple had their second child, Nanda Bayin, in November 1535.) The commoner's affair with the king's sister under Burmese law constituted an act of treason. Ye Htut spurned suggestions of mutiny and submitted to arrest. Tabinshwehti deliberated at length with his ministers, and finally came to the conclusion that Ye Htut should be given his sister in marriage, and a princely title of Kyawhtin Nawrahta. With this decision, Tabinshwehti won the loyalty of his brother-in-law "without parallel in Burmese history".

=== Military leadership ===
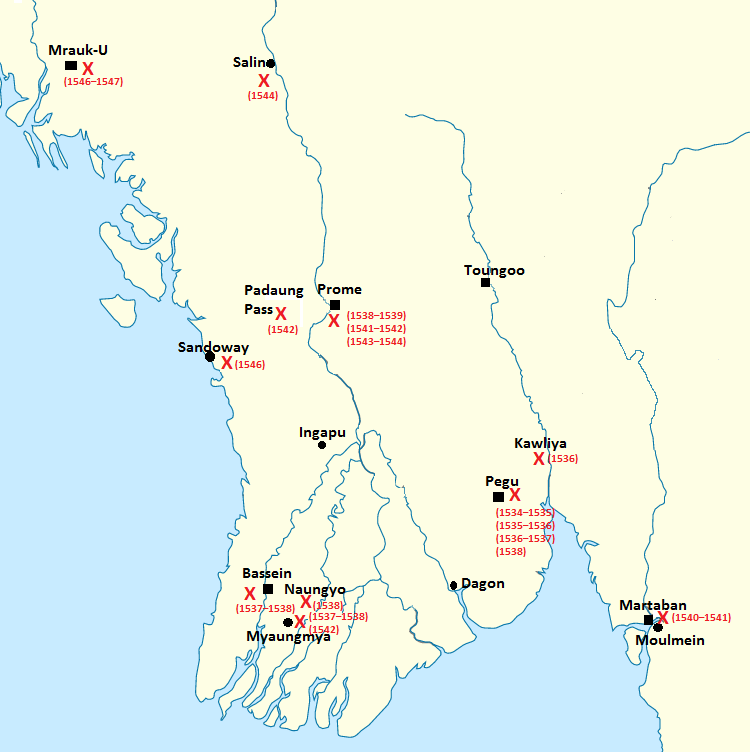
Toungoo military campaigns (1534–1547)

Tabinshwehti's decision would pay enormous dividends in the following years. Between 1534 and 1549, Toungoo would bring war to all its neighbors and in the process found the largest polity in Burma since the fall of Pagan in 1287. Ye Htut would win many key battles for his king, and help administer the growing kingdom.

In late 1534, Toungoo attacked Hanthawaddy, the larger, wealthier but disunited kingdom to their south. It was Toungoo's gambit to break out of its narrow landlocked realm before the Confederation's attention turned to the last remaining holdout in Upper Burma. While Toungoo did not yet have any foreign firearms, due to receiving a constant flow of refugees from elsewhere in Upper Burma for the last three decades, Toungoo did have more manpower than it normally could have enlisted.

Tabinshwehti and Ye Htut (now styled as Kyawhtin Nawrahta) were to cut their teeth in failure however. Their maiden annual dry-season campaigns (1534–1537) all failed against Pegu's well armed, heavily fortified defenses. But their performance got better with each successive campaign, penetrating deeper and deeper into Hanthawaddy territory. They finally broke through in their 1538–1539 campaign, and captured Pegu. Kyawhtin Nawrahta made his name in the Battle of Naungyo in which his light forces decisively defeated numerically superior Hanthawaddy forces in the Irrawaddy delta. The battle, one of the most famous in Burmese military history, has been called "the first characteristic touch" of the great Bayinnaung. After the battle, a grateful Tabinshwehti bestowed upon his brother-in-law the title of Bayinnaung ("King's Elder Brother"), the name by which he would be remembered.

Toungoo went on to conquer all of Hanthawaddy by mid-1541, gaining complete control of Lower Burma's manpower, access to foreign firearms and maritime wealth to pay for them. And Tabinshwehti would use these new assets for further expansions. By incorporating Portuguese mercenaries, firearms and military tactics into the Toungoo armed forces, Tabinshwehti and Bayinnaung continued to grow as military leaders. The duo also benefited from having experienced former Hanthawaddy military commanders like Saw Lagun Ein and Smim Payu serve as their top military advisers and generals. With their help, Bayinnaung delivered key decisive victories at the Battle of Padaung Pass (1542) against Prome's ally Arakan and the Battle of Salin (1544) against the Confederation, enabling Toungoo to take over central Burma as far north as Pagan (Bagan). After Bayinnaung crushed the Arakanese forces in April 1542, Tabinshwehti was so pleased with the victory that he made Bayinnaung the heir-apparent of the kingdom.

The duo's later campaigns against Arakan (1545–1547) and Siam (1547–1549), however, fell short. In both campaigns, Toungoo forces won all major open battles, and went on to lay siege to the capitals, Mrauk-U and Ayutthaya respectively. But they still had no answer to heavily fortified defenses equipped with Portuguese firearms, and had to retreat both times. Toungoo's own Portuguese supplied cannon had little impact on the walls of both capitals. Nor did they have enough manpower (19,000 and 12,000 troops respectively in the Arakanese and Siamese campaigns) for long-term sieges. Nonetheless, despite the setbacks, Tabinshwehti and Bayinnaung had by 1549 built up the largest polity in Burma since the fall of the Pagan Empire in 1287, stretching from Pagan in the north to Tavoy in the south.

=== Administrative duties ===
Bayinnaung was also entrusted to administer the kingdom. Tabinshwehti appointed him chief minister in 1539. In the then prevailing administrative model, the role of the prime minister was limited to managing and coordinating semi-independent tributaries, autonomous viceroys, and governors who actually had control over day-to-day administration and manpower. Trusted local rulers like Smim Payu and Saw Lagun Ein were appointed by the king to assist Bayinnaung with central administration.

In 1549, Tabinshwehti, who had developed a liking to wine, gave up all administrative duties to Bayinnaung, and spent much of his time on long hunting trips away from the capital. Concerned by the king's erratic behavior, ministers at the court urged Bayinnaung to take over the throne but he declined, saying he would try to "win back the king to his old sense of duty to his own kingdom". He was unsuccessful. Even when faced with a serious rebellion by Smim Htaw, the king asked Bayinnaung in January 1550 to suppress the rebellion, and went on another months-long hunting trip.

== Restoration of the Toungoo Empire ==
=== Interregnum ===
On 30 April 1550, Tabinshwehti was assassinated by his own bodyguards on the order of Smim Sawhtut, one of the king's close advisers. Smim Sawhtut naturally proclaimed himself king. But so did all other major governors and viceroys—including Bayinnaung's own brother Minkhaung II. Although Bayinnaung had been Tabinshwehti's chosen heir apparent since 1542, none of them acknowledged Bayinnaung as the rightful successor. When Bayinnaung received the news of the assassination, he was in Dala (modern Yangon) chasing after Smim Htaw's rebel forces. The Toungoo Empire, which he had helped found and expand for the last 16 years, lay in ruins. He, as a colonial era historian noted, was "a king without a kingdom".

Bayinnaung would have to rebuild the kingdom all anew. At Dala, with "few but faithful" troops, he plotted his next moves. His two eldest younger brothers Minye Sithu and Thado Dhamma Yaza II were with him and remained loyal. Also in his service was an ethnic Mon commander named Binnya Dala who would become his most trusted adviser and "best commander". Because he did not yet have any foreign mercenaries who could handle firearms, he sent for his favorite Portuguese mercenary Diogo Soares de Mello who had greatly impressed him in the Siamese campaign. Soares, who was abroad, returned with his men (all 39 of them), and he was warmly received by Bayinnaung.

Two months after the assassination, Bayinnaung was ready to start the restoration project. He faced the following adversaries:

Region	Ruler(s)	Notes
Toungoo (East Central Burma)	Minkhaung II	Bayinnaung's younger half-brother
Prome (West Central Burma)	Thado Dhamma Yaza I	Father-in-law of Tabinshwehti
Pegu (Central Lower Burma)	Smim Sawhtut	Governor of Sittaung; Tabinshwehti's assassin
Martaban (Upper Tenasserim Coast)	Smim Htaw	Half-brother of King Takayutpi; in revolt since January 1550; seized Martaban in May
Pagan (Northern Central Burma)	Sokkate	Toungoo native
Upper Burma and Irrawaddy Delta	Various rulers	Did not take sides but fortified their cities/towns during the interregnum

=== Central Burma (1550–1551) ===
==== Toungoo (1550–1551) ====
After much deliberation, Bayinnaung and his advisers decided that their war of restoration would begin at Toungoo, the original home of the dynasty. It was a calculated gamble since they would have to pass through the heart of Pegu-controlled territory. But they decided to take the gamble because they felt Bayinnaung would find the best support in his native Toungoo rather than deep in the Mon country they found themselves in.

In late June, Bayinnaung and his small but cohesive unit of fighting men left Dala for Toungoo. They marched north to Hinthada, and then crossed over to the eastern side of Bago Yoma, north of Pegu. Smim Sawhtut, now "king" of Pegu, came out with his army to stop them. Bayinnaung, as recounted by the chronicles, paid "no more heed than a lion does to jackals", and marched on. Discovering that Bayinnaung's target was not Pegu, Sawhtut did not engage them. Bayinnaung set up camp at Zeyawaddy (ဇေယျဝတီ), 50 km (31 miles) outside of Toungoo. Once there, Bayinnaung received many of the ministers and soldiers of Tabinshwehti's old court, who fled Pegu and Martaban. The new arrivals were of all ethnic backgrounds, Burmans, Shans and Mons, demonstrating that in 16th-century Burma, "vertical patron-client structures often preempted horizontal ones, even those as strong as ethnic identity and cultures".

By late August, he had collected a serious fighting force (9600 men, 200 horses, 20 elephants, 200 war boats). His land and naval forces began the attack on 2 September 1550, (Note: Chronicles (Hmannan Vol. 2 2003: 262) say that the campaign began on Tuesday, 2nd waning of Tawthalin 912 ME, which was Thursday, 28 August 1550. However, 5th waning of Tawthalin 912 ME (2 September 1550) gives the correct date: Tuesday. Moreover, 2nd waning is likely a typographical error since Burmese numerals 2 (၂) and 5 (၅) are very similar.) and laid siege to the city. Minkhaung resisted for four months but finally surrendered on 11 January 1551. Remarkably, Bayinnaung forgave his brother. On the same day, he was crowned king at the temporary palace. He rewarded his men with upgraded titles and positions. His eldest son Nanda was made the heir apparent.

==== Prome (1551) ====
The Toungoo command selected Prome as their next target. In March 1551, (Note: The chronicle Maha Yazawin (Maha Yazawin Vol. 2 2006: 202) gives Friday, 8th waxing of Late Tagu 912 ME as the date when the Prome campaign began. The date (though not the day of the week) was corrected by later chronicles Yazawin Thit and Hmannan Yazawin (Hmannan Vol. 2 2003: 266) as Friday, 2nd waxing of Late Tagu 912 ME. Both dates are slightly off with respective to the day of the week given: Hmannan's 2nd waxing of Late Tagu 912 ME translates to Sunday, (not Friday), 8 March 1551 while Maha Yazawin's 8th waxing of Late Tagu 912 ME translates to Saturday (not Friday), 14 March 1551.) Bayinnaung's army (9000 troops, 300 horses, 25 elephants) attacked the city. But the city's musket and artillery fire kept them at bay for over three months. He retreated on 19 June 1551, (Note: Chronicles (Maha Yazawin Vol. 2 2006: 203) give Wednesday, 2nd waning of Waso 913 ME, which actually translates to Friday, 19 June 1551.) and regrouped with men from central Burma (up to Myede and Sagu) whose rulers now submitted to the new rising power. Another 9000-strong army resumed the siege on 21 August 1551, (Note: Chronicles (Maha Yazawin Vol. 2 2006: 204) give as Thursday, 6th waning of Tawthalin 913 ME, which was Friday, 21 August 1551.) and took the city on 30 August 1551. Bayinnaung ordered the execution of Prome's ruler Thado Dhamma Yaza I but regretted the decision immediately afterwards. He appointed his second eldest younger brother as viceroy of Prome with the style of Thado Dhamma Yaza II.

==== Pagan (1551) ====
Bayinnaung then proceeded to complete the conquest of northernmost central Burma up to Pagan (Bagan) by mid-September 1551. He appointed his uncle Min Sithu governor. He then marched to Ava, hoping to take advantage of the civil war between King Mobye Narapati and Sithu Kyawhtin, governor of Sagaing. But he was forced to withdraw speedily as Pegu forces marched toward Toungoo.

=== Lower Burma (1552) ===
Pegu's forces withdrew from his territory but Bayinnaung now decided that Pegu must be eliminated first. Meanwhile, Mobye Narapati, who had been driven out of Ava, came to join Bayinnaung. After five months of preparation, Bayinnaung's army (11,000 men, 500 horses, 40 elephants) left Toungoo for Pegu on 28 February 1552 and arrived before the city on 12 March 1552. (Note: Chronicles (Maha Yazawin Vol. 2 2006: 206) and (Hmannan Vol. 2 2003: 270) both give Sunday, 6th waxing of Late Tagu 913 ME, which translates to Monday, 29 February 1552, as the start date of the campaign. But it should be Sunday, 5th (not 6th) waxing of Late Tagu 913 ME because the chronicles themselves say the army arrived at Pegu 13 marches later. Per the Shwezigon Pagoda Bell Inscription (Maha Yazawin Vol. 2 2006: 339), the army took Pegu on 12 March 1552 (Saturday, 3rd waning of Late Tagu 913 ME). Thus, the army left Toungoo on Sunday 5th waxing of Late Tagu 913 ME (28 February 1552).) Smim Htaw, who had taken over Pegu in August 1550, came out and challenged Bayinnaung to single combat, which Bayinnaung accepted. The two men on their respective war elephants fought. Bayinnaung was victorious, driving Htaw and his elephant off the field. Htaw's men fled following their leader.

Htaw and his small army fell back to the Irrawaddy delta. The Toungoo armies followed up, taking eastern delta towns by the end of March. Htaw's army briefly retook Dala in a daring attack but they were finally defeated near Bassein (Pathein) in mid-May. His entire army, including his chief queen and father-in-law, were captured. Htaw barely escaped. He would be on the run as a fugitive until he was captured and executed in March 1553. By mid-1552, Bayinnaung had gained control of all three Mon-speaking regions (Bassein, Pegu, and Martaban). He appointed his eldest younger brother Minye Sithu as viceroy of Martaban on 6 June 1552.

=== Upper Burma (1553) ===
Two years after Tabinshwehti's death, Bayinnaung had restored the late king's empire. But he considered his job unfinished because Siam, which according to him had been remiss in sending him, the rightful successor of Tabinshwehti, tribute. He seriously considered invading Siam but his advisers led by Binnya Law, governor of Bassein, recommended that he should attack Ava instead. Taking their advice, the king sent 14,000-strong combined land and naval forces led by his heir apparent Nanda on 14 June 1553. But Ava's new king Sithu Kyawhtin (of the House of Mohnyin) was ready. He had enlisted troops from five allied Shan states (Mohnyin, Mogaung, Momeit, Onbaung, and Bhamo) and from his own vassal states throughout the Mu valley and Kyaukse districts. Arrayed against overwhelming defenses, Nanda called off the invasion.

=== Coronation ===
Bayinnaung decided to consolidate his gains instead. He commissioned a new palace, called Kanbawzathadi, in his capital Pegu on 17 November 1553. On 12 January 1554, he was formally crowned king with the reign name of Thiri Thudhamma Yaza (သီရိ သုဓမ္မ ရာဇာ). His chief queen, Thakin Gyi, was crowned with the reign name of Agga Mahethi (အဂ္ဂ မဟေသီ).

== Expansion of the Toungoo Empire ==
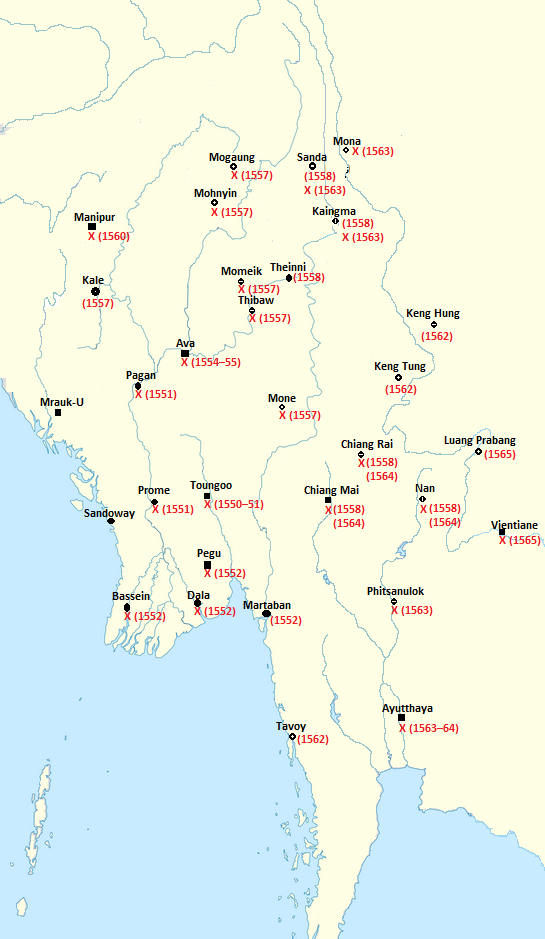
Major military campaigns and the expansion of Toungoo Empire (1550–1565)

The reconquest of Lower Burma gave him complete control of much needed access to foreign firearms and maritime wealth to pay for them. In the next two decades, he would use these assets for further expansions, and by pyramiding manpower and resources from newly conquered lands, he would found the largest empire in the history of Southeast Asia. (Note: (Lieberman 2003: 151–152): Pegu "exercised suzerainty from Manipur to the Cambodian marches and from the borders of Arakan to Yunnan" and was "probably the largest empire in the history of Southeast Asia".)

=== Upper Burma (1554–1555) ===
By late 1554, Bayinnaung had assembled a large invasion force (18,000 men, 900 horses, 80 elephants, 140 war boats), the largest mobilization to date. Precautions were taken on the frontiers to guard against attacks from Lan Na, Siam and Arakan. In November 1554, Toungoo forces launched a two-pronged invasion, one up the Sittaung valley and the other up the Irrawaddy valley. Avan defenses, supported by nine Confederation armies (from Bhamo, Kale, Mogaung, Mohnyin, Momeik, Mone, Nyaungshwe, Theinni and Thibaw-Onbaung), could not stop the advance, and the capital Ava fell to the southern forces on 22 January 1555. King Sithu Kyawhtin was sent to Pegu. Bayinnaung appointed his younger brother Thado Minsaw viceroy of Ava. Toungoo forces then drove out the remaining Confederation armies from the Chindwin valley up to Monywa, the Mu valley up to Myedu and the Kyaukse valley up to Singu by late March.

Bayinnaung now controlled both the Irrawaddy and Sittaung river valleys, the corridors to and from the "heartland" where most of the food of the country was produced and its population lived. Still, his hold on Upper Burma was small—his northernmost outpost Myedu was only about 160 km (100 miles) from Ava—and tenuous since he had not secured the allegiance of the surrounding Shan states, which had been the source of constant raids into the upcountry since the 14th century, and indeed dominated much of it since the early 16th century. He needed to bring the surrounding unruly states under control if his hold on Upper Burma was to last.

=== Cis-Salween Shan states (1557) ===
By 1556, the king and his court had decided that all the Shan states immediately surrounding the Irrawaddy valley needed to be reduced in one shot. They also recognized that they may need to take on Lan Na (Chiang Mai), which was an ally of the powerful state of Mone. The Toungoo command spent the year assembling the largest army yet (36,000 men, 1200 horses, 60 elephants, 180 war boats, and 100 cargo boats) for the invasion.

The invasion of the Shan country began in January 1557. (The armies left their Ava base between 24 December 1556 and 8 January 1557.) The massive show of force worked. States submitted one after another with minimal resistance. By March 1557, Bayinnaung in one stroke controlled most of the cis-Salween Shan states from the Patkai range at the Assamese border in the northwest to Mohnyin (Mong Yang), Mogaung (Mong Kawng) in present-day Kachin State to Momeik (Mong Mit), and Thibaw (Hsipaw) in the northeast. But order broke down right after the army left. The powerful state of Mone (Mong Nai), which sent in tribute in 1556 and thus did not face the invasion, revolted with the support of Lan Na, which was ruled by Mekuti, a brother of Mone's ruler. Mone forces went on to occupy Thibaw, and executed the new saopha appointed by Bayinnaung. In November 1557, five Toungoo armies (33,000 men, 1800 horses, 170 elephants) led by the king himself invaded, and easily occupied Mone and Thibaw.

By the end of 1557, of the cis-Salween states, only the Chinese vassals—Theinni (Hsenwi; present-day northern Shan State), Mowun, Kaingma, Sanda, and Latha (present-day Dehong and Baoshan prefectures in Yunnan, China) (Note: See (Harvey 1925: 151) and (Thein Hlaing 2011: 156) for the exact location of Chinese Shan states.)—remained outside Bayinnaung's grasp. The Toungoo command seriously considered attacking Theinni as Thado Minsaw's army was already in neighboring Thibaw. But they decided not to open another front while Lan Na remained a threat to the southern Shan states.

State(s)	Present-day locations	Date of acquisition
Thibaw (Onbaung), Momeik, Mogok	Northwestern Shan State, northern Mandalay Region	25 January 1557
Mohnyin	Southern Kachin State, northern Sagaing Region (through its vassal Kale)	6 March 1557
Mogaung	Central Kachin State	11 March 1557
Mone, Nyaungshwe, Mobye	Southern Shan State and northern Kayah State	November 1557

=== Lan Na (1558) ===
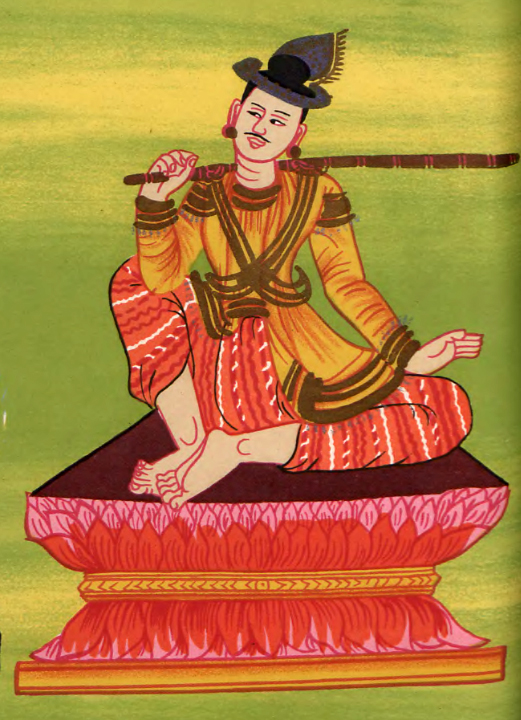
King Mekuti represented as Yun Bayin, Burmese nat

Bayinnaung now eyed the once powerful Kingdom of Lan Na, which had been involved in dynastic struggles between two branches of the Mengrai dynasty. The rule of King Mekuti of the House of Mone had been resisted by King Setthathirath of Lan Xang, grandson of King Ketklao of Lan Na. When Bayinnaung and his armies showed up at the gates of Chiang Mai on 31 March 1558, Mekuti surrendered without a fight on 2 April 1558. The Burmese king allowed Mekuti to remain ruler of Lan Na, and brought several artisans, many of whom were notable lacquerware workers, back to Pegu. He left a small garrison of 1000 men commanded by Binnya Dala and Binnya Set at Chiang Mai.

Order broke down soon after the main armies left. Setthathirath occupied eastern provinces of Lan Na (Phrae, Nan, Chiang Rai and Chiang Saen). In November 1558, a 14,000-strong army led by Thado Minsaw reinforced Chiang Mai's defenses, and from there the combined armies then successfully drove out the Lan Xang forces from the territories.

=== Cis-Salween Chinese Shan states (1558–1559) ===
Lan Xang's defeat cemented Toungoo Burma's emergence as the premier power in the Shan country. The remaining cis-Salween Shan states fell in line even if they probably continued paying tribute to China. (Note: (Yule 1857: 88–89): The "Nine Shan States" (Ko Shan Pye), which included Mowun, Latha and Sanda, paid tribute to both China and Burma down to the 19th century. Only Kaingma (north of Theinni, in China today) was absent from the Chinese list.) Theinni sent preemptive tribute, received on 26 July 1558. It was followed by tributary missions by the smaller Chinese vassal states of Mowun, Kaingma, Latha and Sanda in early 1559.

=== Manipur (1560) ===
Bayinnaung immediately put manpower from the newly acquired territories to acquire yet more territory. On 2 December 1559, he ordered an invasion of Manipur, ostensibly to address the small kingdom's alleged transgressions into Kale's territory. He had recalled Binnya Dala from Chiang Mai to lead the invasion. The three armies (10,000 men, 300 horses, 30 elephants), mostly made up of conscripts from Kale, Mohnyin, Mogaung, Momeik and Sanda, faced minimal resistance. The Manipuri raja surrendered around February 1560.

=== Trans-Salween Chinese Shan states (1562–1563) ===
The king spent the next two years preparing for war against Siam, which he considered his unfinished business. He set up a garrison at Tavoy (Dawei) on 17 June 1562. But he first wanted to bring the trans-Salween Shan states into his fold, probably to get more manpower as well as to secure the rear. The Burmese chronicles states that he was merely responding to a July 1562 rebellion by his cis-Salween Chinese Shan states with support from trans-Salween Shan states. However, as with Manipur, it may just have been a pretext. He sent four 12,000-strong armies, led respectively by Nanda, Thado Dhamma Yaza II, Minkhaung II and Thado Minsaw. The southernmost trans-Salween state of Kengtung submitted prior to the invasion on 16 December 1562. The armies launched a two-pronged invasion of the Taping valley in March/April 1563. (Note: The invasion likely began in late March/early April. (Hmannan Vol. 2 2003: 344): Armies left their lowland bases only on 26 February 1563 (Friday, 4th waxing of Tabaung 924 ME). It would have taken at least a month from central Burma to the Chinese border.) The armies faced minimal resistance, and secured the allegiance of the local saophas. Bayinnaung now had at least nominal suzerainty over the Chinese Shan states from the cis-Salween states in the Taping valley to Kenghung (present-day Xishuangbanna Dai Autonomous Prefecture, Yunnan) in the east.

=== Siam (1563–1564) ===
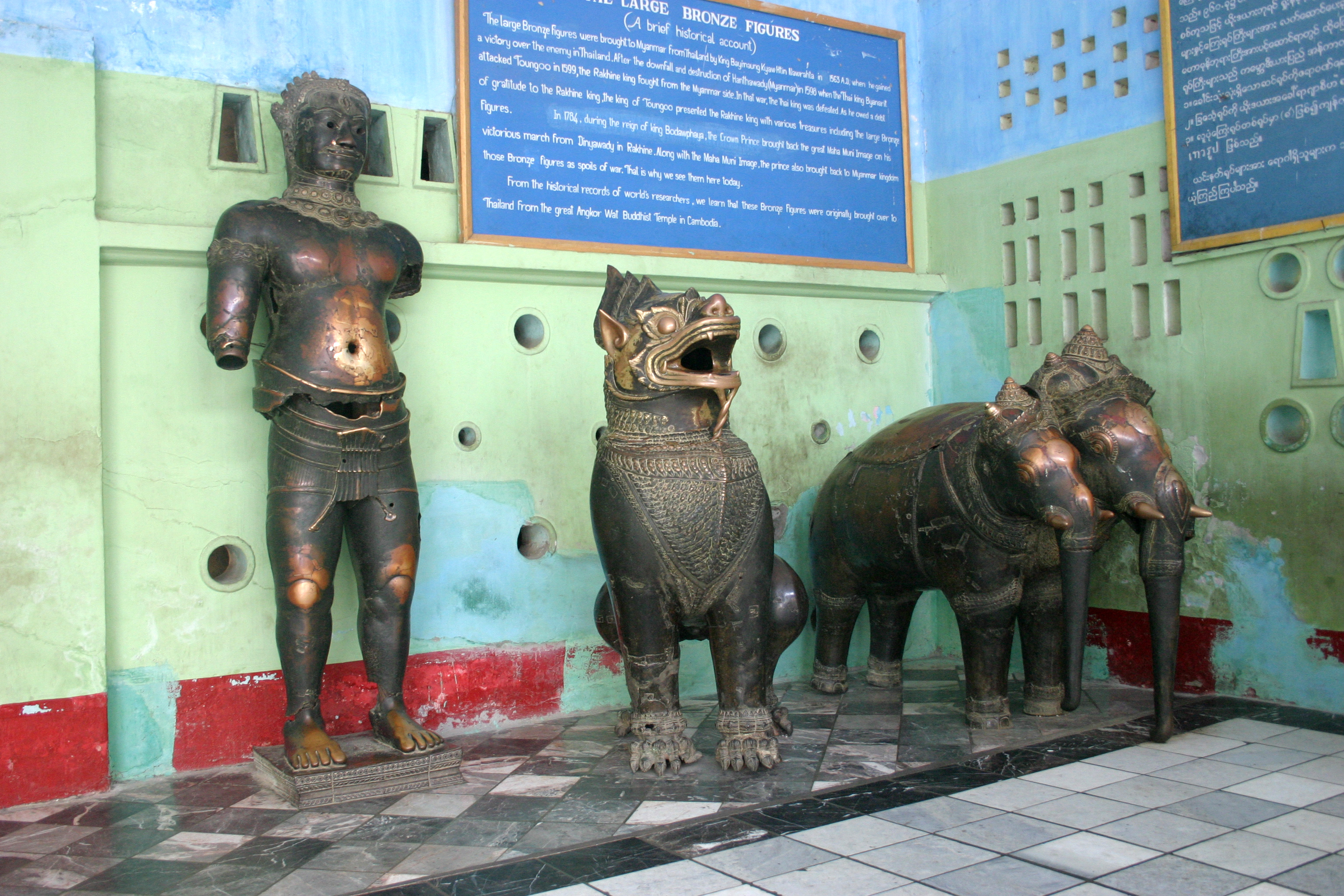
Surviving Khmer bronze statue of the 30 statues taken from Ayutthaya in 1564, taken to Mrauk-U in 1600 by the Arakanese, and to Amarapura in 1785 by Thado Minsaw.

With much of western mainland Southeast Asia under his control, Bayinnaung now felt ready to take on Siam. He needed an overwhelming advantage in manpower over Siam because unlike interior Shan states, Siam could not be overwhelmed by the strength of his Portuguese firearms alone. Siam was a prosperous coastal power in its own right, and its forces included Portuguese firearms, ships and mercenaries. On 16 July 1563, he sent an embassy to Siam, demanding one of the four white elephants in possession of the Siamese king as tribute. As expected, King Maha Chakkraphat duly refused. On 1 November 1563, (Note: Chronicles (Maha Yazawin Vol. 2 2006: 268) give as Monday, 12th waning of Tazaungmon 925 ME, which is likely a typographical error, as it translates to Thursday, 11 November 1563. It may have been 2nd waning of Tazaungmon 925 ME, which was Monday, 1 November 1563.) five armies (60,000 men, 2400 horses and 360 elephants) left Pegu to start the campaign. Another army from Lan Na was supposed to come down but King Mekuti of Lan Na had revolted.

The invasion route was via central Siam. The armies took the key central town of Kamphaeng Phet on 4 December 1563. (Note: (Maha Yazawin Vol. 2 2006: 266): Armies arrived before Kamphaeng Phet after 32 marches, and took the city the next day.) Three of the armies then fanned out to acquire the key central Siam cities of Sukhothai, Phitsanulok, and Sawankhalok. Aside from a five-day battle at Phitsanulok, the armies faced minimal opposition. The rulers of the three cities as well as the ruler of Phichit submitted, and were reappointed to their positions.

The armies then marched down to Ayutthaya. There, they were kept at bay for weeks by the Siamese fort, aided by three Portuguese warships and artillery batteries at the harbor. The invaders finally captured the Portuguese ships and batteries on 7 February 1564, after which the fort promptly fell. The Siamese king surrendered on 18 February 1564. Bayinnaung took all four white elephants, among other loot, and sent the fallen king to Pegu. He appointed Mahinthrathirat, a son of the fallen king, vassal king of Siam, and left a garrison of 3000. Thai sources state that Bayinnaung also took Prince Ramesuan (ราเมศวร), the eldest son of Maha Chakkraphat, back with him as well as Phraya Chakkri (พระยาจักรี), the chancellor of Ayutthaya, and Phra Sunthon Songkhram (พระสุนทรสงคราม), the military chief of Ayutthaya.

=== Lan Na and Lan Xang (1564–1565) ===
Although he had finally conquered Siam, he still needed to deal with the middle Tai country. King Mekuti of Lan Na had allied himself with his old rival Setthathirath of Lan Xang. On 23 October 1564, Bayinnaung himself led five massive armies (64,000 men, 3600 horses, 330 elephants) and began a two-pronged invasion of Lan Na. The levies hailed from all over the empire, including Siam whose troops were led by Ramesuan, the former crown prince of Siam. The massive show of force worked. When four southern armies showed up at Lamphun, 20 km south of Chiang Mai, on 25 November 1564, the commanders leading Chiang Mai's defenses simply fled the city. Mekuti now submitted, asking for forgiveness. Bayinnaung spared the broken king's life, and sent him to Pegu. The Burmese king then stayed in Lan Na for the next four months, administering the country. He appointed Queen Visuddhadevi, as the vassal ruler of Lan Na before leaving Chiang Mai on 10 April 1565 to deal with a serious rebellion in Pegu.

Lan Xang proved a much more difficult project however. Three armies led by the crown prince himself invaded Lan Xang, and easily captured Vientiane on 2 January 1565. (Note: (Maha Yazawin Vol. 2 2006: 278): The armies left Chiang Mai five days after the conquest of the city, which means they left on 30 November 1565. (Maha Yazawin Vol. 2 2006: 285–286): They arrived before Vientiane 32 days later, and took the city the next day.) But King Setthathirath escaped. For the next several months, the Burmese troops fruitlessly chased him and his small band of men around the Laotian countryside. Many troops died of starvation and disease. The Burmese command finally gave up, and the armies left Vientiane on 1 August 1565. They had installed a son-in-law of Setthathirath as vassal king. They also brought back many members of the Lan Xang royalty, including Setthathirath's 18-year-old brother, Maha Ouparat.

Lan Na was to be at peace for the rest of Bayinnaung's reign. At Vientiane, however, the vassal king's authority did not extend much beyond the capital, backed by the Burmese garrison. Setthathirath remained active in the countryside, and would return to Vientiane in late 1567.

== Maintaining the empire ==
After the Lan Xang campaign, Bayinnaung had at least nominal control over the lands stretching from Manipur in the northwest to Lan Xang in the east; and from the Chinese Shan states in the north to the central Malay peninsula in the south. After a brief lull, he was to spend nearly a decade (1568–1576) keeping the empire intact.

=== Interlude (1565–1567) ===
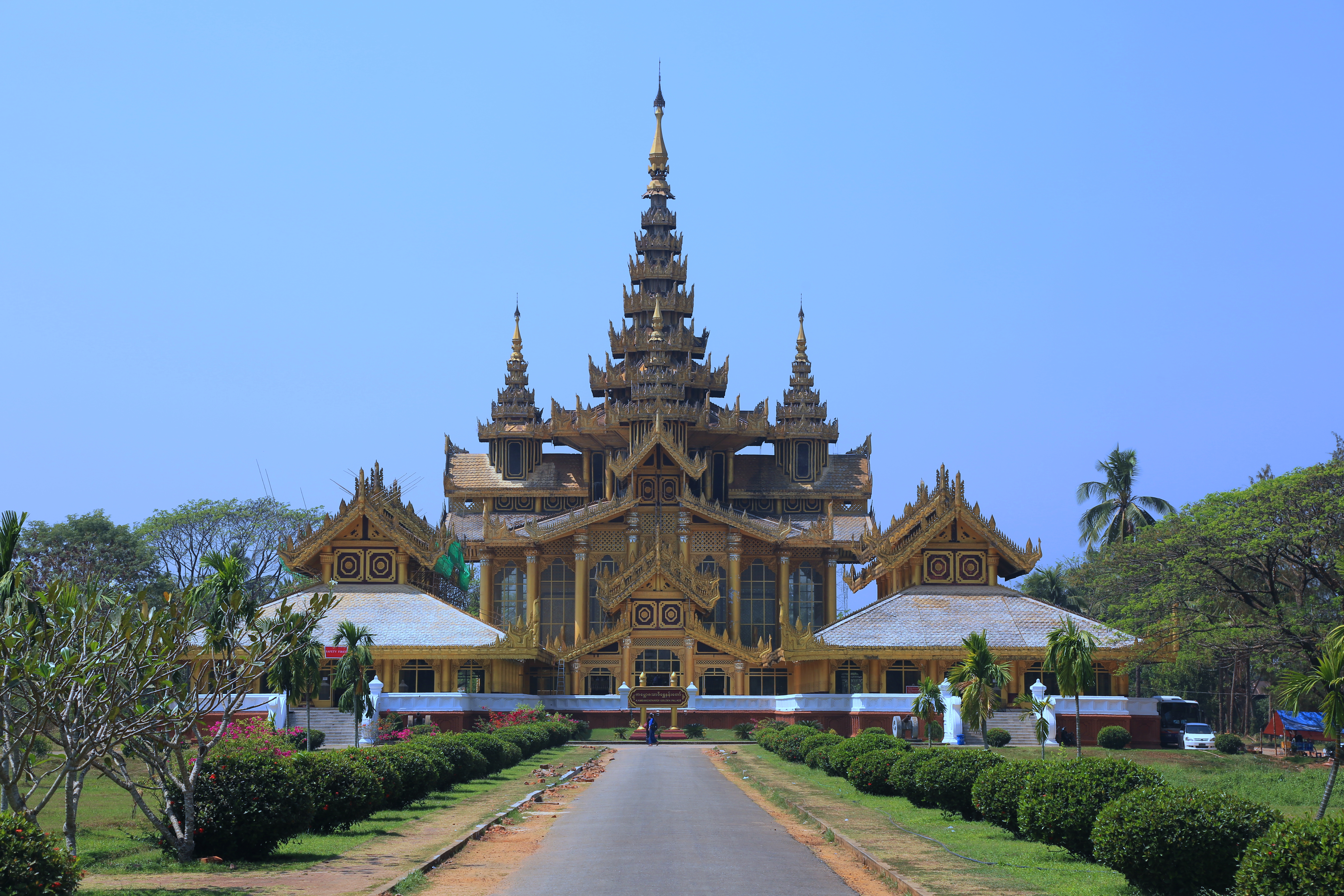
Kanbawzathadi Palace

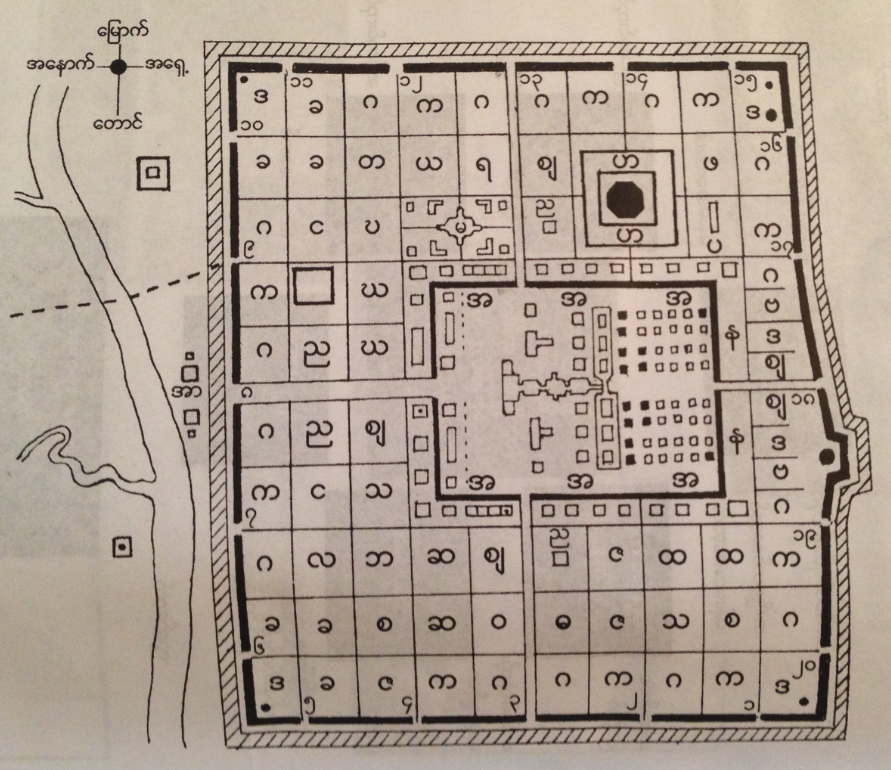
Plan of the city of Pegu (Bago), 1568

After the 1565 rebellion by resettled Shans in Pegu, he faced no new rebellions for the next two years (1565–1567). Because the rebellion burned down major swaths of the capital, including the entire palace complex, he had the capital and the palace rebuilt. The new capital was of a square shape with walls facing the 4 cardinal directions. 20 gates were built, 5 on each wall, representing vassal states of the Toungoo Empire.

The 20 gates are as follows:

At the Eastern rampart-

1. Prome(Pyay) gate (ပြည်တံခါးပေါက်)
2. Ava gate (အင်းဝတံခါးပေါက်)
3. Toungoo gate (တောင်ငူတံခါးပေါက်)
4. Lan Xang gate (လင်းဇင်းတံခါးပေါက်)
5. Dala gate (ဒလတံခါးပေါက်)

At the Southern rampart-

1. Chiang Mai gate (ဇင်းမယ်တံခါးပေါက်)
2. Ohm Baung(Hsipaw) gate (အုန်းဘောင်တံခါးပေါက်)
3. Möngyang gate (မိုးညှင်းတံခါးပေါက်)
4. Mogaung gate (မိုးကောင်းတံခါးပေါက်)
5. Dawei gate (ထားဝယ်တံခါးပေါက်)

At the Western rampart-

1. Kalay gate (ကလေးတံခါးပေါက်)
2. Möng Nai gate (မိုးနဲတံခါးပေါက်)
3. Nyaung Shwe gate (ညောင်ရွှေတံခါးပေါက်)
4. Tharawaddy gate (သာယာဝတီတံခါးပေါက်)
5. Theinni(Hsenwei) gate (သိန္နီတံခါးပေါက်)

At the Northern rampart-

1. Tenasserim gate (တနင်္သာရီတံခါးပေါက်)
2. Yodaya(Ayutthaya) gate(ယိုးဒယားတံခါးပေါက်)
3. Martaban(Mottama) gate(မုတ္တမတံခါးပေါက်)
4. Pakhan gate (ပုခန်းတံခါးပေါက်)
5. Bassein(Pathein) gate (ပုသိမ်တံခါးပေါက်)

Each gate had a gilded two-tier pyatthat and gilded wooden doors.

The moat that surrounds the city was described to have "a width of 20 ta (64m), a depth of 15 taung (7m)". The ramparts of the city were also described to have a height of 15 taung (7m).

The newly rebuilt Kanbawzathadi Palace was officially opened on 16 March 1568, with every vassal ruler present. He even gave upgraded titles to four former kings living in Pegu: Mobye Narapati of Ava, Sithu Kyawhtin of Ava, Mekuti of Lan Na, and Maha Chakkraphat of Siam.

=== Lan Xang and Siam (1568–1569) ===
Even as he triumphantly entered the new palace as the universal ruler, or cakkavatti, trouble was already brewing in Lan Xang. About a month earlier, he had been informed that Setthathirath's forces not only had retaken Vientiane but were also raiding eastern districts of central Siam and Lan Na. In response, he had rushed down troops from the Shan states and Upper Burma to the border. But it was a rush job. The army could only muster 6000 troops on short notice, and was thoroughly routed at the border.

More bad news piled up. He learned on 12 May 1568 that southern Siam (Ayutthaya) too had revolted, and entered into an alliance with Lan Xang. The rebellion was led by Maha Chakkraphat, the deposed king of Siam whom Bayinnaung had just showered with honors and permitted to return to Ayutthaya on pilgrimage as a monk. No sooner had the monk arrived at Ayutthaya than he flung off the robe, and declared independence. But all was not lost. The ruler of central Siam (Phitsanulok), Maha Thammarachathirat, remained loyal to him. On 29 May 1568, a dismayed Bayinnaung sent an army of 6000 to reinforce Phitsanulok.

The war began in June. Desperate to consolidate the Chao Phraya valley before the expected dry-season invasion, combined Ayutthaya and Lan Xang forces braved unforgiving rainy season conditions and laid siege to Phitsanulok. But Phitsanulok's reinforced defenses held. In late October/early November, the besiegers retreated to their respective cities before the upcoming invasion. Bayinnaung's five armies (54,600 men, 5300 horses, 530 elephants) arrived at Phitsanulok on 27 November 1568. (Note: (Hmannan Vol. 2 2003: 402–403): The armies left Pegu on 11 October 1568 (6th waning of Thadingyut 930 ME) and took 47 marches to get to Phitsanulok. Thus they got there on 27 November 1568.) Reinforced at Phitsanulok, combined armies of 70,000 (Note: Harvey's estimate per (Harvey 1925: 334)) marched down along the Chao Phraya to Ayutthaya, and laid siege to the city in December 1568.

But the Burmese armies, despite taking immense losses, could not break through for months. When Setthathirath and his army approached to relieve the city, Bayinnaung left Binnya Dala in command of the siege, and left with half his force to meet the enemy. On 8 May 1569, he decisively defeated Setthathirath northeast of the city, after which Lan Xang ceased to be of concern to the siege operations. Meanwhile, Maha Chakkraphat had died, and his son Mahinthrathirat made an offer of conditional surrender. It was refused. Bayinnaung demanded an unconditional surrender. Instead he sent one of his Siamese nobles to the city, pretending to be a deserter. King Mahinthrathirat promptly appointed him to a high command. Through the spy's treacherous machinations, one of the city's gates was opened. The city fell on that very night on 2 August 1569. (Note: Both standard chronicles Maha Yazawin and Hmannan Yazawin say the city fell on Tuesday, 4th waning of Wagaung 931 ME, which translates to Monday, 1 August 1569. The Yazawin Thit chronicle correctly gives it as Tuesday, 5th waning of Wagaung 931 ME which gives Tuesday, 2 August 1569.) Bayinnaung appointed Maha Thammarachathirat king of Siam on 29 September 1569. (Note: (Maha Yazawin Vol. 2 2006: 324) gives 5th waning of Thadingyut 931 ME, without specifying the day of the week. (Yazawin Thit Vol. 2 2012: 157) gives Tuesday, 1st waning of Thadingyut 931 ME (Sunday, 25 September 1569). (Hmannan Vol. 2 2003: 419) says Wednesday, 5th waning of Thadingyut 931 ME, which translates to (Thursday, 29 September 1569))

=== Remote regions ===
While Bayinnaung had decisively defeated Siam, his most powerful rival in the region, his greatest challenge would turn out to be keeping remote, mountainous states in the farthest corners of his empire in check. Guerrilla warfare by small rebel armies combined with difficult terrain and starvation caused more problems for the king's armies than the armies of Siam ever did.

==== Lan Xang (1569–1570) ====
The remote hilly Lan Xang proved most troublesome. He personally led the two-pronged invasion of Lan Xang in October 1569. Setthathirath made a stand at Vientiane for a few months before retreating into the jungle in February 1570 to conduct his tried-and-true guerrilla warfare. Bayinnaung and his men spent the next two months combing the Lao countryside. Setthathirath was nowhere to be found but many Burmese troops died of starvation and from long marches. Bayinnaung finally called off the search in April 1570, and returned home. When the king arrived back at Pegu, very few men of the original army had survived to reach their own country.

==== Northern Shan states (1571–1572) ====
Lan Xang was not the only remote, mountainous region the Burmese king had trouble controlling. The northernmost Shan states of Mohnyin and Mogaung (and their vassals in present-day Kachin State and Sagaing Region) collectively revolted in July 1571. He sent two 12,000-strong armies led by Nanda and Thado Dhamma Yaza II. The armies easily recaptured the states. But, like in Lan Xang, the troops spent five punishing months fruitlessly chasing after the renegade saophas in the snow-clad foothills of the Himalayas.

==== Lan Xang (1572–1573) ====
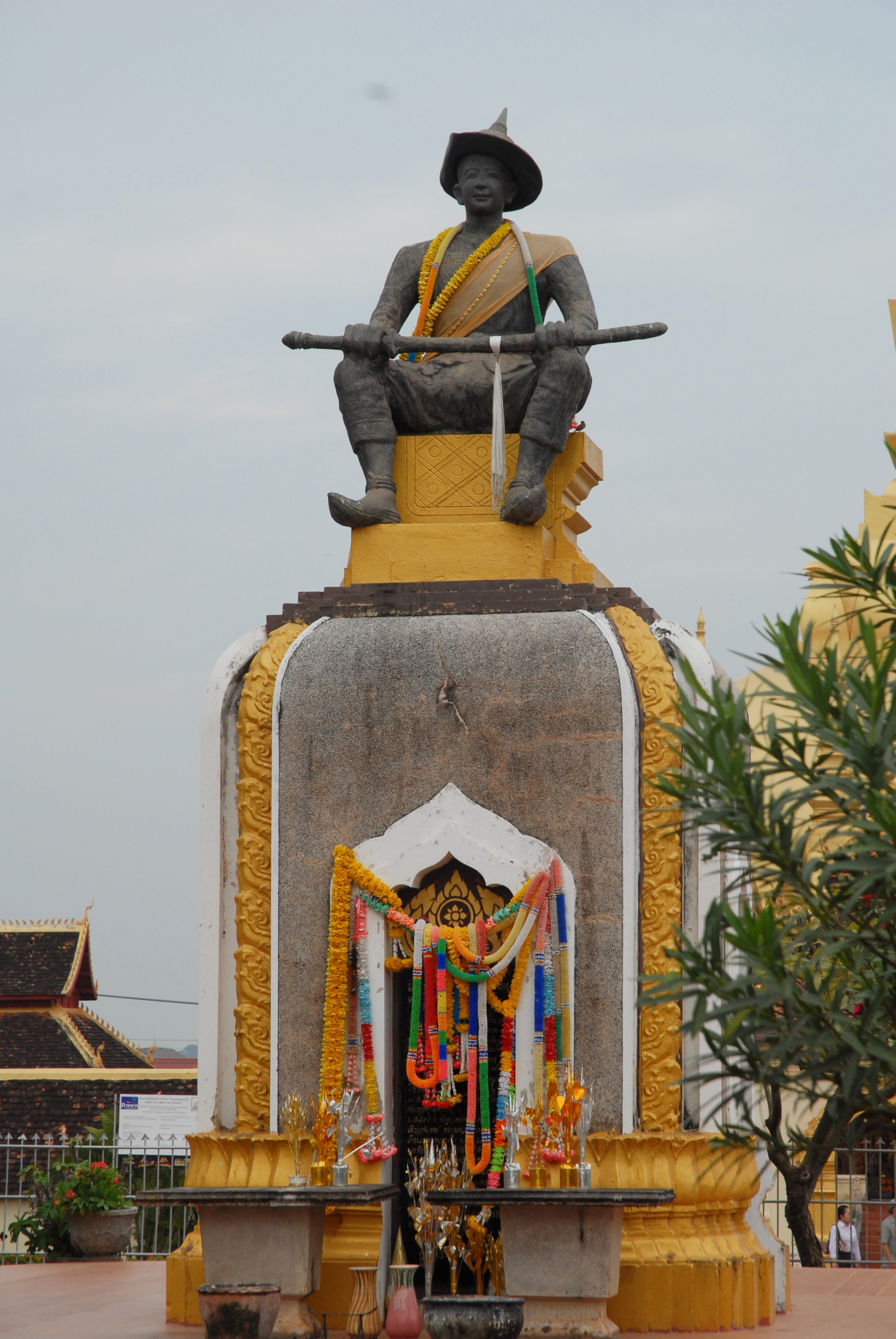
Statue of King Setthathirath at Vientiane today

Meanwhile, Setthathirath's forces sacked the Burmese garrison at Vientiane. Fortunately for the Burmese, so it seemed, the Lan Xang king was killed shortly after—sometime before mid-1572, and a senior minister and general named Sen Soulintha seized the throne. (In Laotian history, the events took place a year earlier. Setthathirath retook Vientiane in the dry season of 1570–1571, and died in 1571.) Much to his surprise, Soulintha refused Bayinnaung's ultimatum to submit. Incredulous, Bayinnaung sent Binnya Dala to lead an invasion with a small army of 6000, with the majority of troops coming from Lan Na and Siam. But he and the Toungoo court had underestimated the opposition. Lan Xang's strength was more than Setthathirath, and Soulintha proved no pushover. The small Burmese army suffered from guerrilla attacks, and had to retreat in early 1573. At Pegu, the king was furious at Binnya Dala, hitherto his most trusted adviser and favorite general, despite the fact that he had given the general little to work with. He sent Binnya Dala into exile "to a sickly place" in central Siam, where the general who had won him many a battle died from illness six months later.

==== Lan Xang and northern Shan states (1574–1577) ====
He immediately ordered the levy to be raised to invade Lan Xang in the following dry season of 1573–1574. But the kingdom had been in constant campaign mode, and his annual demands of more levies were pushing his vassals to the breaking point. Even his senior advisers murmured loudly, and the king reluctantly agreed to postpone the expedition for a year. The respite did little to restore the ranks of depleted vassals. When the conscription drive came in 1574, the northernmost states of Mohnyin and Mogaung refused, and revolted.

The king was unfazed. He ordered Thado Minsaw, the ruler of Ava, to take care of the northern states while he personally led the Lan Xang campaign. On 1 October 1574, Thado Minsaw's army (6000 men, 800 horses, 80 elephants), made up of regiments from Upper Burma and the Shan states, marched north. Six days later, Bayinnaung's four armies (34,000 men, 1800 horses, 180 elephants), with regiments from Lower Burma, Lan Na and Siam, began the Lan Xang campaign. The armies arrived before Vientiane after 60 days marching. (Note: (Hanthawaddy Hsinbyushin Ayedawbon 1967: 384–385): It took 31 marches to Siam, and another 29 marches to Vientiane. The vanguard army led by Nanda took the city.) On 6 December 1574, the king and his massive armies faced no opposition entering Vientiane, as Soulintha had already evacuated to the countryside. Fortunately for the Burmese king, Soulintha was viewed as a usurper by his own officers, who arrested him and presented him to the conqueror. Burmese armies again fanned out to and received tribute from the Lao countryside, including easternmost Lan Xang, which is now part of present-day Vietnam. The Burmese king appointed a younger brother of Setthathirath, Maha Oupahat (Chao Tha Heua), king of Lan Xang with the regnal name Voravongsa I, and returned to Pegu on 16 April 1575. Since he was a true high Lan Xang royal he was accepted by the populace as the rightful successor to Setthathirath. Lan Xang was finally under control.

The low-grade rebellion in Mohnyin and Mogaung remained a pesky thorn in Bayinnaung's side. The rebel chiefs simply retreated to the jungle when the army showed up, returning right after the army left. The king was particularly annoyed that the leader of the rebellion, the young saopha of Mogaung, had been raised at the Pegu palace, and that he himself had appointed him to the office in 1572. He personally marched north in late 1575, and sent several battalions to comb the jungles. One battalion ran into the rebels deep in the hills, and killed the saopha of Mohnyin. But the saopha of Mogaung escaped and remained at large for another year and a half. When the renegade saopha was finally captured, and brought before the king on 30 September 1577, (Note: (Maha Yazawin Vol. 3 2003: 62): Tuesday, 3rd waning of Thadingyut 939 ME, which translates to Monday, 30 September 1577) the king ordered that the young chief be exhibited in fetters for a week at each of the twenty gates of Pegu, and that he and his followers be sold as slaves in India. (Note: (Maha Yazawin Vol. 3 2006: 63): The saopha of Mogaung and over a hundred of his followers were sold at the slave markets of Golkonda (present-day southeastern India).)

== Later years ==
=== Ceylon ===
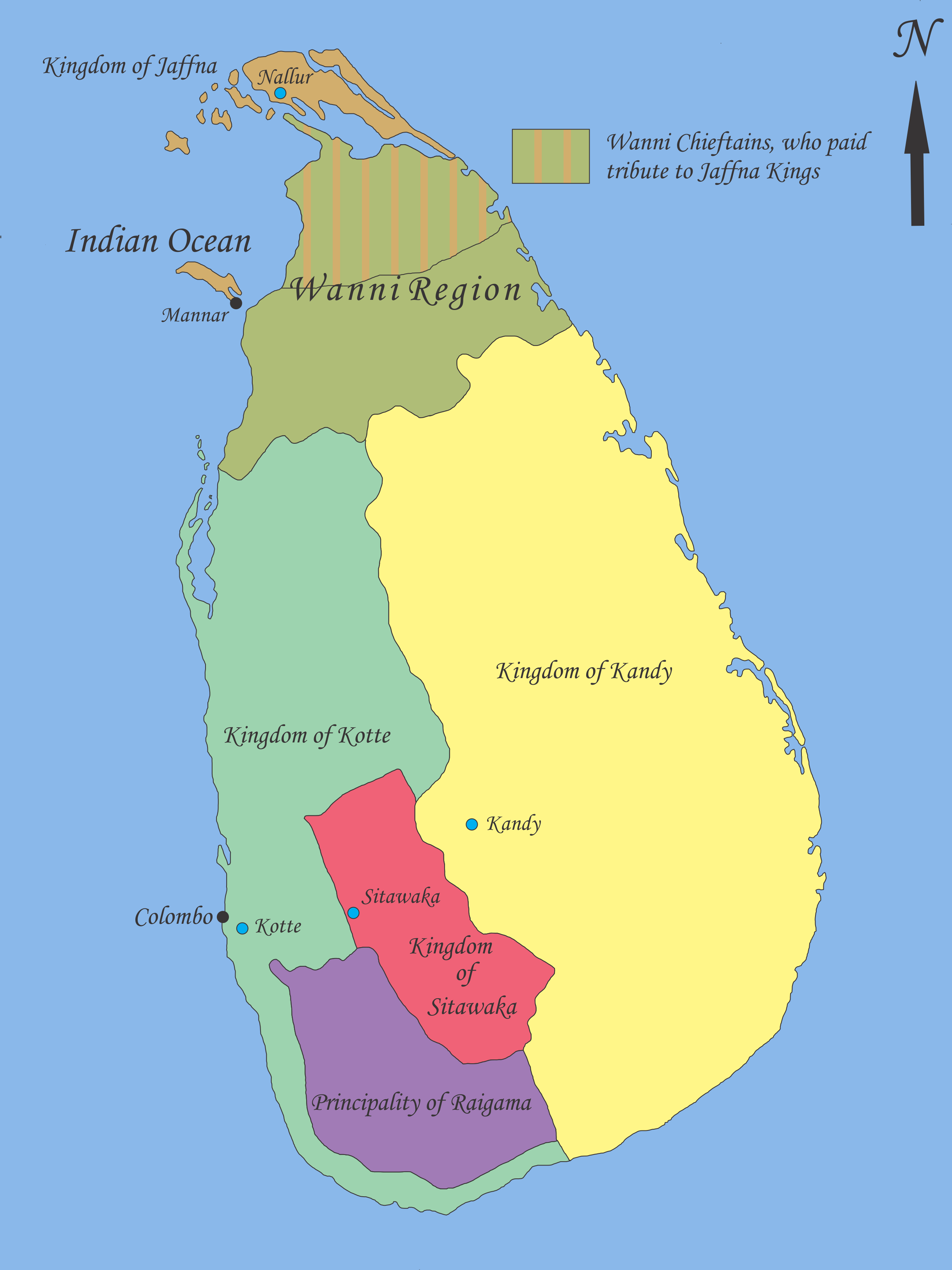
16th-century Ceylon

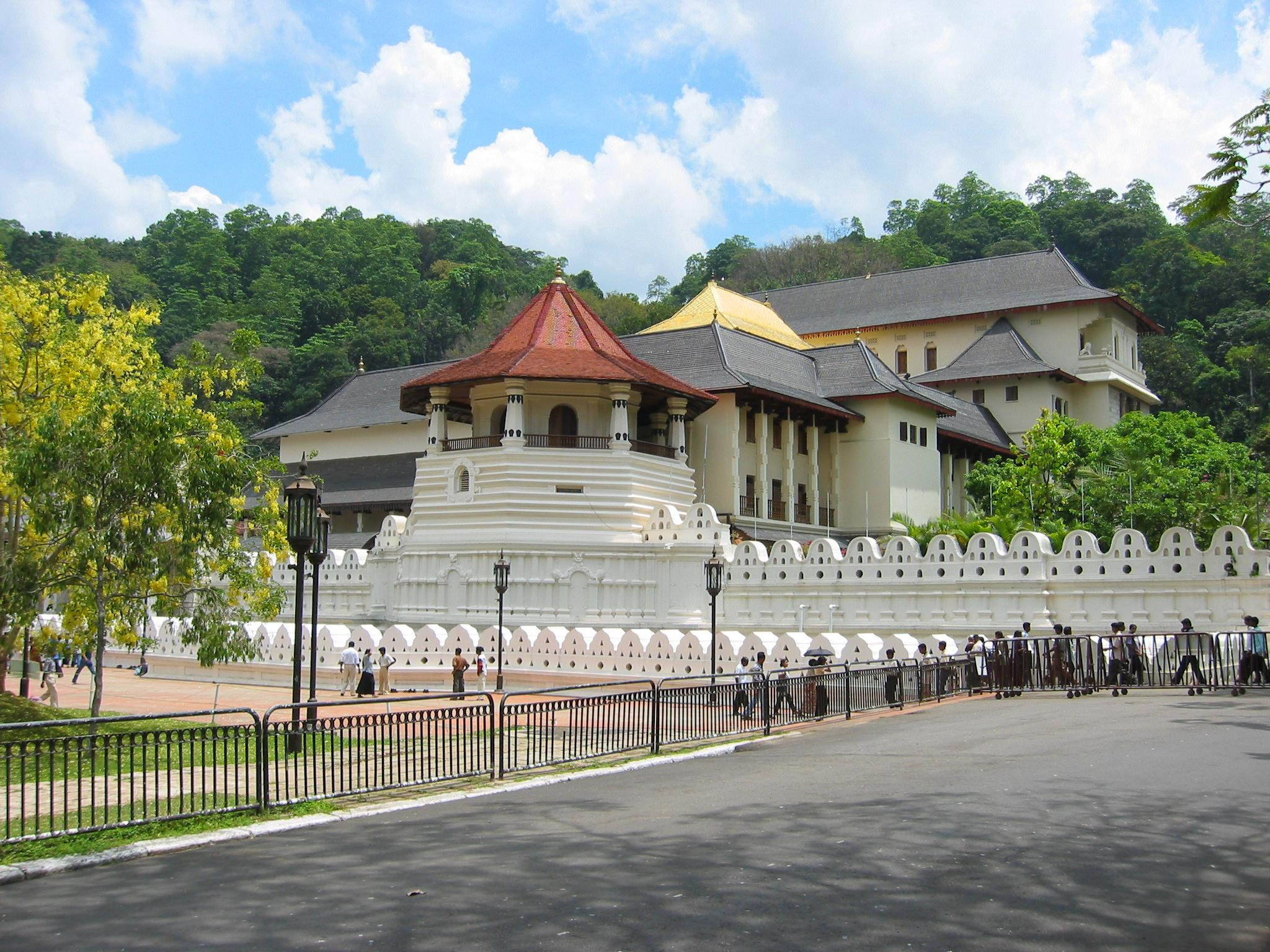
Temple of the Tooth Relic in Kandy, Sri Lanka

By 1576, almost no one wanted to challenge Bayinnaung's rule, and the rest of his reign was to be relatively quiet. Other states in the region—in particular, rival Ceylonese kingdoms—were keen to receive his support. For his part, Bayinnaung viewed himself as the protector of Theravada Buddhism, and had long tried to promote and protect the religion in Ceylon. Two decades earlier, in November 1555, he sent rich presents to the Tooth of Kandy, and bought land there to keep lights continually burning at the shrine. His craftsmen beautified the temple and swept it with the broom made of his and his chief queen's hair. In 1560, upon hearing that the Portuguese had seized and taken the tooth relic to Goa, he sent envoys to secure the relic for 800,000 silver kyats (41,000 pounds sterling) and shiploads of rice, whenever needed, to provision the Portuguese garrison at Malacca. Viceroy Constantino de Bragança was interested but the Archbishop of Goa, Gaspar de Leão Pereira, overruled him by threatening the viceroy with an Inquisition style trial. In 1561, "while the Burmese envoys gazed in frozen horror, the archbishop placed the Tooth in a mortar, grounded it to powder, burned it in a brazier, and cast the ashes into the river". The Ceylonese however claimed that the destroyed relic had been a replica, and that the true Tooth had remained in Ceylon. Two teeth, claimed to be the real Tooth, appeared in Ceylon, one at Colombo and the other at Kandy.

By the 1570s, both Kotte and Kandy were jockeying for Bayinnaung's support. King Dharmapala of Kotte was the most active. He presented who he said was his daughter to Bayinnaung. The princess was received with great fanfare at Bassein (Pathein) on 24 September 1573. According to G.E. Harvey, however, the Kotte king's action was not voluntary: the Burmese king had demanded a princess to fulfill a prophecy given by his astrologers, and Dharmapala, who had no daughters, complied by sending the daughter of a chamberlain, whom he had treated as his own. At any rate, Dharmapala, who had converted to Catholicism, continued to curry favor by sending what he claimed was the real Tooth relic, ostensibly to be safeguarded under the protection of the great Buddhist king. The main purpose of his mission was to seek military help against a rebellion. The Tooth was received on 14 July 1576. While it is unclear whether Bayinnaung actually believed in the authenticity of the relic, the possession of a holy Tooth, which many millions of subjects believed in, was of the highest importance. In return, Bayinnaung sent 2500 of his best "invulnerables" from all parts of the empire in five ships to Colombo. (Note: (Maha Yazawin Vol. 3 2006: 56–57): The invulnerables consisted of 100 men each from Kengtung, Lan Na, Lan Xang, Siam, Tenessarim, Manipur, Tavoy; 300 from the Chinese Shan states (Maingmaw, Sigwin, and Tayok); and 500 Mons, 500 Burmans and 500 Shans.) The king's best troops easily defeated the rebellion, which was noticed by the other three rulers on the island. Chronicles say that the Burmese generals then received the rulers of the four kingdoms of Ceylon in Colombo, and instructed them to safeguard the religion. King Karaliyadde Bandara of Kandy, offered a daughter and what he claimed was the real Tooth. But His Majesty, seeing no reason to reopen the case, would not enter into controversy with skeptics and dismissed them with thanks.

=== Lan Na and Lan Xang (1579) ===
No troubles arose when Queen Visuddhadevi of Lan Na, who had successfully kept the middle Tai country quiet for over 13 years, died on 2 January 1579. Bayinnaung's choice Nawrahta Minsaw, one of his sons, faced no problems taking over the Lan Na throne. When instabilities arose in Lan Xang, he took no chances. On 17 October 1579, he sent a sizable army (22,000 men, 1200 horses, 120 elephants), which faced no opposition. According to Laotian history, the vassal king of Lan Xang Maha Ouparat died in 1580, and Bayinnaung installed Sen Soulintha, the usurper whom he had kept in Pegu since 1574, as the successor. The Burmese chronicles make no mention of any change for the rest of the king's reign. The Chronicles' lone post-1579 entry on Lan Xang during his reign simply states that on 2 September 1581, the king commissioned a Buddhist pagoda in Lan Xang. The Chronicles say that the vassal king died in September/October 1588.

=== Arakan (1580–1581) ===
By 1580, not only had the "universal ruler" subdued all the countries which had occupied his attention for the last three decades but he also had the respect of neighboring states. He faced no internal or external threats (although Portuguese Goa considered itself technically at war with Burma for her interference in Ceylon). Instead of resting, he turned his gaze on Arakan, the kingdom he and Tabinshwehti unsuccessfully tried to conquer in 1545–1547. He determined that it was now time to reduce the western coastal kingdom to the vassal status it held under the Pagan kings once more. A year earlier, he had sent an embassy to Emperor Akbar of the Mughal Empire, which had just acquired Bengal in 1576, perhaps to ascertain whether his occupation of Arakan would be viewed as an act of hostility to the Mughals.

At any rate, the king sent an 8000-strong naval invasion force on 15 October 1580. The fleet, which consisted of 200 ships, went on to occupy Sandoway in November 1580. (Note: (Phayre 1967: 119): According to Portuguese accounts, a few warships of Goa actually engaged the fleet near Cape Negrais, but had to withdraw because the sheer size of the enemy fleet, which the Portuguese estimated to be about 1300 boats and ships.) The king had probably planned to lead the assault on the Arakanese capital Mrauk-U by himself but could not because of his failing health. The invasion force remained inactive at Sandoway for a year. The king sent additional land and naval forces (29,000 troops, 1600 horses, 120 elephants) on 28 August 1581 in preparation for the coming dry season campaign. (Note: (Maha Yazawin Vol. 3 2006: 74) and (Hmannan Vol. 3 2003: 60): Monday, 1st waxing of Thadingyut 943 ME = 28 August 1581) But the king died six weeks later, and the invasion forces withdrew soon after.

== Administration ==
=== Emperor without an empire ===
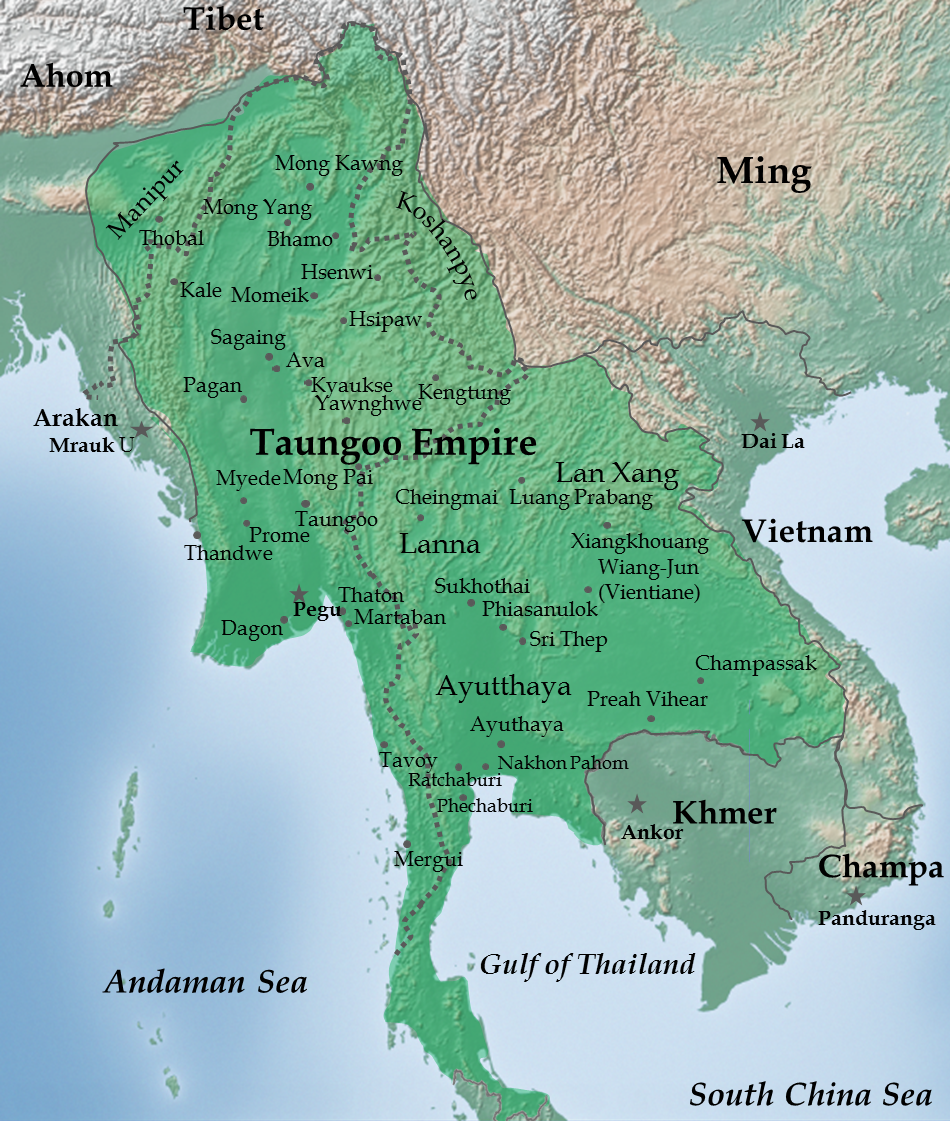
Toungoo Empire in 1580. "States as far east as Vietnam and Cambodia probably paid propitiatory homage to Bayinnaung." Chronicles also claim Cachar and much deeper parts of Yunnan, and treat the Ceylonese Kingdom of Kotte as a protectorate.

Bayinnaung successfully assembled the largest empire in Burmese history. (Note: King Hsinbyushin (r. 1763–1776) briefly approximated Bayinnaung's empire in 1767 but he never had any firm control.) The empire spanned "from Manipur to Cambodian marches and the borders of Arakan to Yunnan", and likely received "propitiatory homage" from states as far east as Vietnam and Cambodia. Notwithstanding its fragility, his realm was certainly the largest empire in the history of mainland Southeast Asia and "probably the largest empire in the history of Southeast Asia". The Portuguese called Pegu "the most powerful monarchy in Asia except that of China".

But Bayinnaung, who began his reign as a "king without a kingdom", ended his reign as an "emperor without an empire". According to Than Tun, Bayinnaung conquered territories not to colonize them but to gain the loyalty of their rulers. He kept conquered kings and lords in their own positions so long as they remained loyal to him. Tun Aung Chain adds that "the extensive polity was held together not so much by formal institutions as personal relationships" based on the concepts of thissa (သစ္စာ, 'allegiance') and kyezu (ကျေးဇူး, 'obligation'). Lieberman writes: "he presented himself as cakkavatti, or World Ruler, par excellence".

This was nothing new. The king was simply following the then prevailing Southeast Asian administrative model of solar polities in which the high king ruled the core while semi-independent tributaries, autonomous viceroys, and governors actually controlled day-to-day administration and manpower. As such, the "King of Kings" governed only Pegu and the Mon country himself, leaving the rest of the realm to vassal kings in Ava, Prome, Lan Na, Lan Xang, Martaban, Siam, and Toungoo. He regarded Lan Na as the most important of all the vassal states, and spent much time there.

Rulers of key vassal states
Region	Appointee	Appointment date	Notes
Ava	Thado Minsaw	19 February 1555	Half-brother
Lan Na	Mekuti; Visuddhadevi; Nawrahta Minsaw	2 April 1558; 10 April 1565; 28 January 1579 (Note: Date given as 2nd waxing of Tabaung 940 ME. Hmannan (Hmannan Vol. 3 2003: 48) gives Wednesday, 5th waxing of Tabaung 940 ME but 5th waxing is a typographical error as it translates to Saturday, 31 January 1579. The date is probably 2nd waxing of Tabaung 940 ME (28 January 1579), which was a Wednesday.)	Native ruler Native ruler Son
Lan Xang	Maing Pat Sawbwa; Maha Ouparat (Chao Tha Heua)	2 January 1565; 6 December 1574	Brother of Setthathirath
Martaban	Minye Sithu; Thiri Thudhamma Yaza	6 June 1552; 26 May 1581	Brother; Son
Prome	Thado Dhamma Yaza II	30 August 1551	Brother
Siam	Mahinthrathirat; Maha Thammarachathirat	18 February 1564; 26 September 1569	Native ruler of Phitsanulok
Toungoo	Minkhaung II	6 June 1552	Half-brother

He administered Lower Burma with the help of ministers, the vast majority of whom were of ethnic Mon background. (The word used by European visitors to describe a court official was semini, Italian translation of smim, Mon for lord.) His chief minister was Binnya Dala, known for his military and administrative abilities, and literary talents.

=== Administrative reforms ===
He introduced administrative reforms only at the margins. By and large, he simply grafted the prevailing decentralized administration system, which barely worked for petty states like his native Toungoo, to the largest polity ever in the region. Indeed, it did not work for mid-size kingdoms like Ava, Hanthawaddy, Lan Na, and Siam. (Ava had always had to contend with Prome and Toungoo; Pegu with Martaban and Bassein; Chiang Mai with Chiang Saen and Nan; Ayutthaya with Phitsanulok; etc.) Now, because of the sheer size of the empire, the system was even more decentralized and stretched thinner still. At any rate, it was the only system the Toungoo kings knew, and they "had no choice but to retain it".

He, perhaps inadvertently, did introduce a key reform, which turned out to be the most important and most enduring of his legacies. It was his policy to administer the Shan states, which had constantly raided Upper Burma since the late 13th century. The king permitted the saophas of the states to retain their royal regalia and ceremonies, and feudal rights over their subjects. The office of the saopha remained hereditary. But the incumbent saopha could now be removed by the king for gross misconduct although the king's choice of successor was limited to members of the saopha's own family. The key innovation was that he required sons of his vassal rulers to reside in his palace as pages, who served a dual purpose: they were hostages for good conduct of their fathers and they received valuable training in Burmese court life. His Shan policy was followed by all Burmese kings right up to the final fall of the kingdom to the British in 1885.

Still, his reforms were ad hoc and experimental. Patron-client relationships still mattered much more than weak or non-existent institutions: his vassals were loyal to him, not Toungoo Burma. The reforms he started would ultimately be expanded by his 17th-century successors. But they had not sufficiently taken root by his death to prevent his "overheated" empire from rapidly collapsing in the next two decades.

=== Legal and commercial standardizations ===
His Majesty introduced a measure of legal uniformity by summoning learned monks and officials from all over his dominions to prescribe an official collection of law books. The scholars compiled Dhammathat Kyaw and Kosaungchok, based on King Wareru's dhammathat. The decisions given in his court were collected in Hanthawaddy Hsinbyumyashin Hpyat-hton. He promoted the new law throughout the empire so far as it was compatible with customs and practices of local society. The adoption of Burmese customary law and the Burmese calendar in Siam began in his reign. He also standardized the weights and measurements such as the cubit, tical, basket throughout the realm.

=== Religious affairs ===
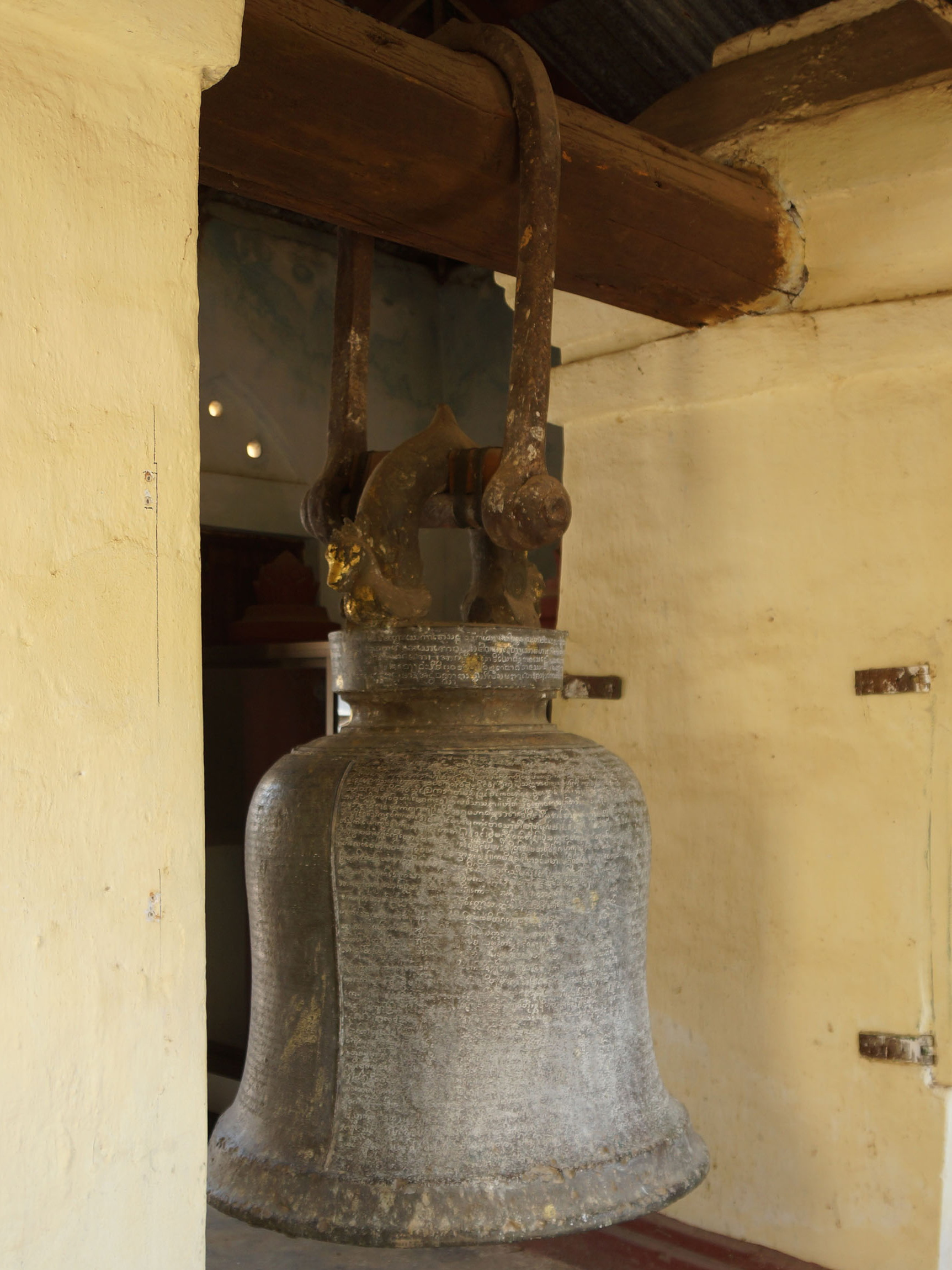
Shwezigon Pagoda Bell donated by Banyinnaung in Bagan. The inscriptions on the bell written in Burmese, Mon, and Pali refer to him as the "Conqueror of the Ten Directions", the title by which he is widely known in Mon and Thai.

Another enduring legacy of Bayinnaung was his introduction of a more orthodox Theravada Buddhism to Upper Burma and the Shan states. He propagated the religious reforms begun by King Dhammazedi in the late 1470s. Viewing himself as the "model Buddhist king", the king distributed copies of the scriptures, fed monks, and built pagodas at every new conquered state from Upper Burma and the Shan states to Lan Na and Siam. Some of the pagodas are still to be seen, and in later ages the Burmese would point to them as proof of their claim to rule those countries still. Following in the footsteps of Dhammazedi, he supervised mass ordinations at the Kalyani Ordination Hall at Pegu in his orthodox Theravada Buddhism in the name of purifying the religion. He prohibited all human and animal sacrifices throughout the kingdom. In particular, he forbade the Shan practice of killing the slaves and animals belonging to a saopha at his funeral. His attempts to rid of animist nat worship from Buddhism, however, failed.

He donated jewels to adorn the crowns of many a pagoda, including the Shwedagon, the Shwemawdaw, the Kyaiktiyo, and many less famous ones. He added a new spire to the Shwedagon in 1564 after the death of his beloved queen Yaza Dewi. His main temple was the Mahazedi Pagoda at Pegu, completed in 1561. He tried but failed to secure the release of the Tooth Relic of Kandy from the Portuguese invaders in 1560. He later interfered with the internal affairs of Ceylon in the 1570s, ostensibly to protect the Buddha Sasana there.

=== Economy ===
His kingdom was mainly an agrarian state with a few wealthy maritime trading ports. The main ports were Syriam (Thanlyin), Dala, and Martaban. The kingdom exported commodities such as rice and jewels. At Pegu, overseas trade was in the hands of eight brokers appointed by the king. Their fee was two percent. Their honesty and businesslike methods won the esteem of European merchants. The wealth was seen at the capital. Contemporary European travelers would "never tire of describing Pegu—the long moat full of crocodiles, the walls, the watch-towers, the gorgeous palace, the great processions with elephants and palanquins and grandees in shining robes, the shrines filled with images of massy gold and gems, the unending hosts of armed men, and the apparition of the great king himself". The king appointed officials to supervise merchant shipping and sent out ships to undertake commercial voyages. The prosperous life at the capital, however, was probably not replicated at the countryside. Annual mobilizations of men greatly reduced the manpower necessary to cultivate the rice fields. Harvests at times fell perilously low, causing severe rice shortages, such as in 1567.

== Military ==
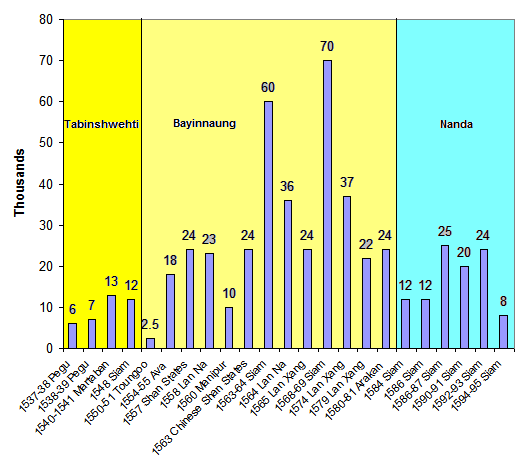
Royal Burmese Army mobilization (1530–1599)

Bayinnaung built the largest empire in Southeast Asia on the back of "breathtaking" military conquests. His success has been attributed to a "more martial Toungoo tradition", Portuguese firearms, foreign mercenaries, and larger forces.

First, he was a product of Toungoo, a rebellion-prone former vassal of Ava, where he as a young man at the palace received a military-style education since childhood. With their training, he and Tabinshwehti launched their first campaign against a larger, wealthier Hanthawaddy when they were both just 18.

Secondly, the beginning of their military careers coincided with the arrival of Portuguese cannon and matchlocks in large quantities. Portuguese weaponry proved superior in accuracy, safety, ballistic weight, and rapidity of fire to Asian-made firearms. The duo arrived at the coast on the cusp of this transformation, and quickly turned it to their advantage, incorporating Portuguese firearms as well as Portuguese and Indian Ocean (mostly Muslim) mercenaries into their forces. Indigenous infantry and elephant units also began using guns, with 20–33% of the troops so equipped on some late 16th century campaigns. According to Lieberman, "had Toungoo attacked Pegu a generation later, it is conceivable that Portuguese guns could have given Pegu the victory, thus altering the course of history". But it was Toungoo that seized Hanthawaddy's advantages and leveraged them into an empire.

Finally, Bayinnaung was able to marshal more manpower than any ruler in the region. He required every new conquered state to provide conscripts for his next campaign. Using both larger forces and superior firearms, he had no trouble reducing Manipur and the entire Shan world to tributary status. His larger forces and their greater fighting experience proved to make the difference against Siam, which too was a wealthy coastal power with a powerful well-equipped military.

It turned out however that Siam was not his greatest adversary. It was the remote mountainous states like Lan Xang, Mohnyin and Mogaung whose guerrilla warfare gave him constant trouble. Many of his men died from starvation and disease while fruitlessly searching for elusive bands of rebels, year after year. (The death toll must have been significant since it made it to the chronicles.) He was fortunate that the charismatic guerrilla leader Setthathirath died. In the end, his military might alone could not bring lasting peace. He needed competent local rulers, who commanded the respect of the local populace, to rule the lands on his behalf. History shows that he used the political solution instead to maintain peace.

To be sure, the individual ingredients alone cannot explain his success. The same ingredients were available to his successors. Yet no one (in Burma or elsewhere in the successor states of his empire) could put them together. For example, he raised upwards of 60,000 to 70,000 men for his major campaigns. His Toungoo successors raised a third at most. It was not until the early Konbaung kings that the army again raised nearly as many men. Harvey notes: "From his teens until his death, he was constantly in the field, leading every major campaign in person. The failure of other kings who attempted the same conquests is the measure of his ability."

== Death and succession ==
The king died on 10 October 1581 after a long illness. (Note: (Hmannan Vol. 3 2003: 61): Tuesday, Full moon of Tazaungmon 943 ME = 10 October 1581. This date in Chulasakarat calendar would translate to 10 November 1581. But per (Eade 1989: 13), there was a difference between Burmese and Siamese intercalary calculations that year. The Siamese Luang Prasaet chronicle records that Pegu informed Ayutthaya that 943 ME was not supposed to be an intercalary year when it was supposed to be in Ayutthaya.) His full reign name at death was "Thiri Tri Bawa Naditra Pawara Pandita Thudhamma Yaza Maha Dipadi".

His eldest son and heir-apparent Nanda took over the throne without incident. But the empire, which Bayinnaung had built on military conquests and maintained by both military power and personal relationships with the vassal rulers, was to crumble soon after. The first crack appeared in the far north in September 1582 when the Chinese Shan states of Sanda and Thaungthut revolted. The rebellion was put down in March 1583. Much more serious cracks followed. Ava (Upper Burma) revolted in October 1583, and the rebellion was put down on 24 April 1584. Siam revolted on 3 May 1584. Nanda would spend the rest of his reign fighting Siam and other former vassals and would lose the entire empire in the process by 1599.

== Family ==
The king had three principal queens consort and over 50 other junior queens. In all, he left 97 children. (Note: Both Maha Yazawin (Maha Yazawin Vol. 3 2006: 77) and Hmannan Yazawin (Hmannan Vol. 3 2003: 73) say that he had 3 sons and 3 daughters by senior queens and 35 sons and 56 daughters junior queens for a grand total of 97 children. But the detailed list of his queens and issue in (Hmannan Vol. 3 2003: 68–73) includes only 86 children (32 sons and 54 daughters). The rest of the children are mentioned in the various parts of the chronicles. The grand total comes to at least 92 different names which consist of 33 sons and 59 daughters. The discrepancy may be due to recording errors in the sex and/or number of the unnamed children who died young. See Family of Bayinnaung for details.) The following is a list of notable queens and their issue.

Queen	Rank	Issue
Atula Thiri Maha Yaza Dewi (အတုလသီရိ မဟာရာဇဒေဝီ)	Chief Queen	Inwa Mibaya, Queen consort of Ava (r. 1555–84); Nanda, King of Burma (r. 1581–99)
Sanda Dewi (စန္ဒာဒေဝီ)	Senior Queen (r. 1553–68); Chief queen (r. 1568–81)	Min Khin Saw, Queen consort of Toungoo (r. 1584–1609)
Yaza Dewi (ရာဇဒေဝီ)	Senior Queen	Nawrahta Minsaw, King of Lan Na (r. 1579–1607/08); Yaza Datu Kalaya, Crown Princess of Burma (1586–93); Thiri Thudhamma Yaza, Viceroy of Martaban (r. 1581–1584)
Khin Pyezon (ခင်ပြည့်စုံ)	Junior queen	Shin Ubote, Governor of Nyaungyan (r. 1573–81); Nyaungyan, King of Burma (r. 1599–1605)

A notable queen of Bayinnaung in Thai history is Suphankanlaya, daughter of King Maha Thammarachathirat of Siam.

== Legacy ==
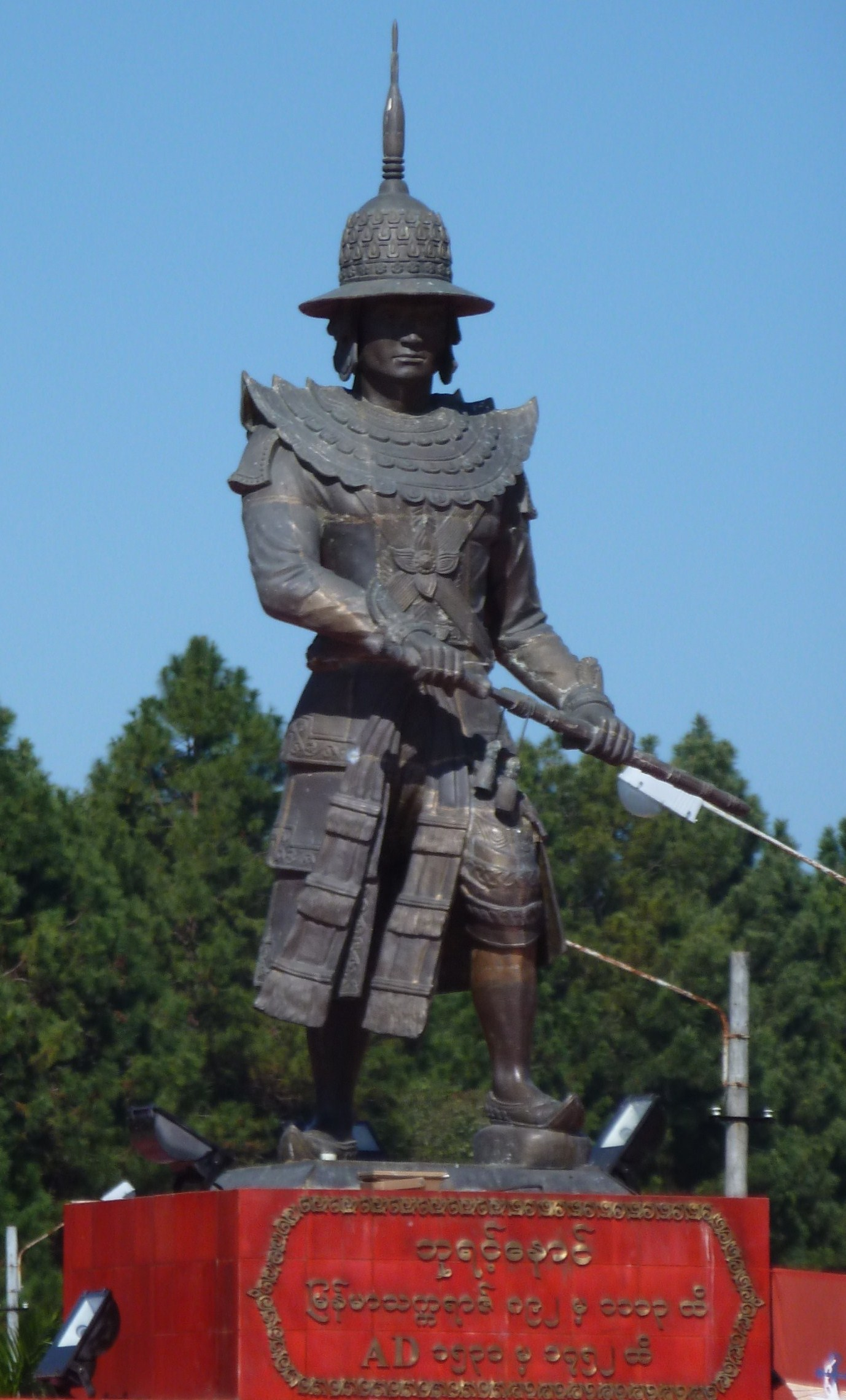
Statue of Bayinnaung in front of the DSA

Bayinnaung is considered one of the three greatest Burmese kings, alongside Anawrahta and Alaungpaya, the founders of the First and Third Burmese Empires, respectively. The king is mostly remembered for his military conquests, not just in Myanmar but also in Thailand and Laos. His reign has been called "the greatest explosion of human energy ever seen in Burma". In Myanmar, the soldier-king is considered the favorite king of the present-day Burmese generals. According to Thant Myint-U, the generals often see themselves "as fighting the same enemies and in the same places ... their soldiers slugging their way through the same thick jungle, preparing to torch a town or press-gang villagers. The past closer, more comparable, a way to justify present action. His statues are there because the ordeal of welding a nation together by force is not just history." In Thailand, he is well known as the "Conqueror of the Ten Directions" (พระเจ้าชนะสิบทิศ), from the 1931 novel Phu Chana Sip Thit (ผู้ชนะสิบทิศ, "Conqueror of the Ten Directions") by Chote Praepan (โชติ แพร่พันธุ์). He has thus far escaped the increasingly negative portrayals of Burmese kings in Thai history books. As the founder of an empire geographically centered in Siam, he is well known by the Thai people, and often still treated with respect. In Laos, King Setthathirath is lionized for his pesky resistance to the empire.

Though he is best known for empire building, his greatest legacy was his integration of the Shan states, which eliminated the threat of Shan raids into Upper Burma, an overhanging concern to Upper Burma since the late 13th century. His Shan policy, greatly enhanced by later Toungoo kings, reduced the power of hereditary saophas, and brought hill customs in line with low-land norms. This policy was followed by Burmese kings right up to the final fall of the kingdom to the British in 1885.

The adoption of Burmese customary law and the Burmese calendar in Siam began in his reign. Siam used the Burmese calendar until 1889.

== Commemorations ==
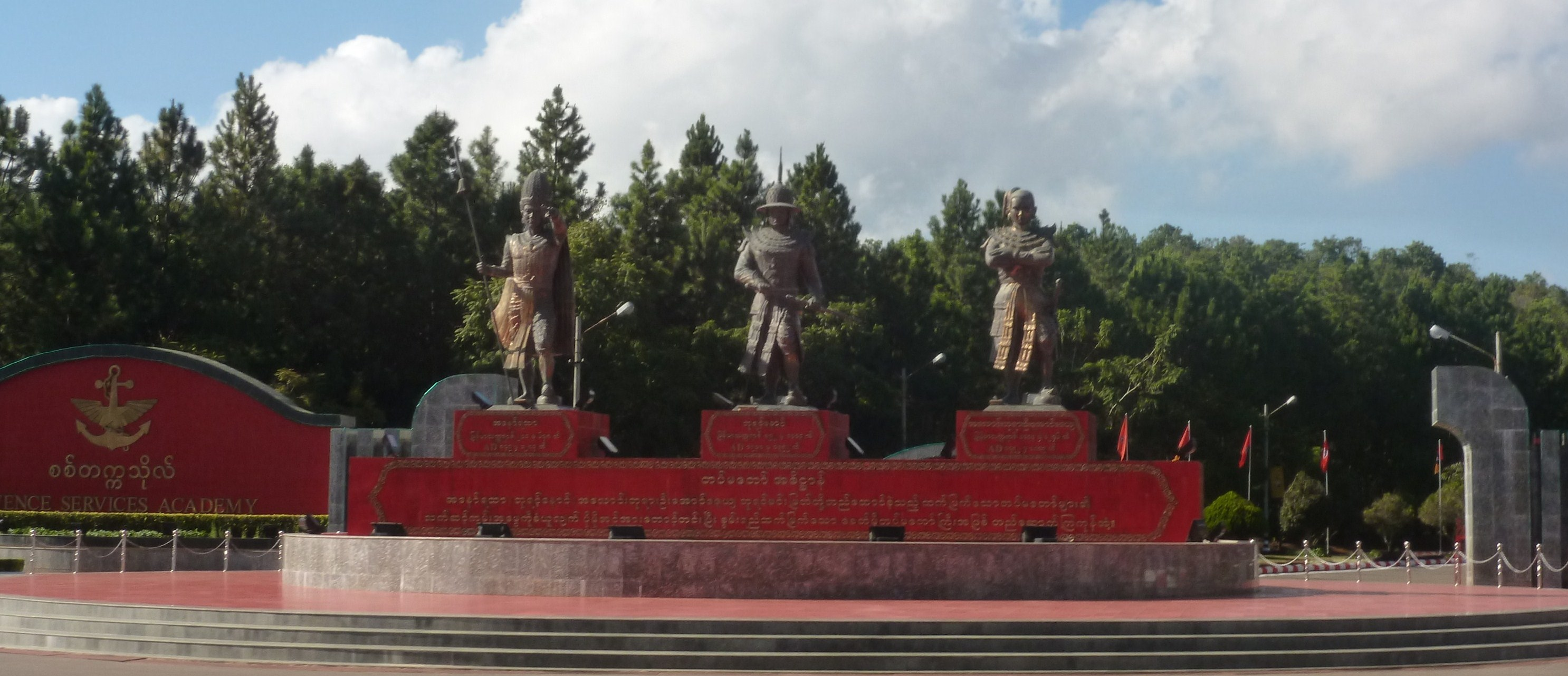
Statue of Bayinnaung (middle) along with the statues of Anawrahta (far left) and Alaungpaya (far right) in front of the DSA.

Bayinnaung is commemorated in Myanmar in several ways.

- Bayinnaung Bridge, a suspension bridge in Yangon
- Bayinnaung Market, a major commodities market in Yangon
- Bayinnaung Road, a road in Yangon
- Bayinnaung Statue, one of the three statues of kings that tower over the main parade square in Naypyidaw. The other two are the statues of Anawrahta and Alaungpaya.
- Fort Bayinnaung, garrison and cantonment area with Army Combat School and other military installations near Thandaung township, Kayin State.
- Cape Bayinnaung, the southernmost point of mainland Myanmar.
- Team Bayinnaung, one of the five student teams in Burmese primary and secondary schools.
- UMS Bayinnaung, Myanmar Navy Anawrahta-class corvette

== In popular culture ==
Bayinnaung is a main character in the 2016 video game Age of Empires II HD: Rise of the Rajas published by Xbox Game Studios.

In Part 1 of the 2007 King Naresuan film series, Bayinnaung is a Burmese conqueror and a father-figure for the young prince Naresuan.

== Notes ==
Bayinnaung Toungoo Dynasty Born: 16 January 1516 Died: 10 November 1581
Regnal titles
Preceded by Tabinshwehti	King of Burma; 30 April 1550 – 10 October 1581	Succeeded by Nanda
Royal titles
Preceded by Tabinshwehti	Heir to the Burmese Throne; April 1542 – 30 April 1550	Succeeded by Nanda
