= Bayinnaung Market =

Major wholesale market in Yangon, Myanmar

- ဘုရင့်နောင်ဈေး
- Location: Mayangon 11062, Yangon; Yangon Division, Myanmar
- Coordinates: 16°51′59″N 96°06′26″E
- Opened: 7 November 1989; 37 years ago

Bayinnaung Market (Burmese: ဘုရင့်နောင်ဈေး; also Bayintnaung Market), located in northwestern Yangon, is the largest agricultural commodities trading market in Myanmar. The market complex measures 17.880 acres, consisting of 2,549 two-story shop houses with floor areas of 1,200 and 2,400 square feet (110 and 220 m^{2}). It is the only legally permitted wholesale center of beans and pulses in the country, which exported 1.34 million tonnes of beans and pulses in 2007 for a total value of US$750 million. It has also developed into a vital commercial area for the trade of automotive and mechanical goods in Yangon.

== History ==
The site where Bayinnaung Market currently stands was formerly a military base. In the late 1980s, under the leadership of the commander of Military Unit No. 22 and city authorities, the land was repurposed for market use. Construction began shortly thereafter, and the market officially opened on 7 November 1989.

== Commodities ==
Matpe is the most common bean and pulse export at the market. In August 2009, about 4,000 tonnes of matpe, green mung, pigeon peas and chickpeas were traded daily. The market is the main wholesale center of dried fish and prawns for mainly domestic markets. The market is at the center of the planned Internet-based commodities information network that will link all of the country's wholesale commodity exchange centers, to achieve consistent pricing and operations in line with international market prices.

Myanmar's wholesale commodity exchanges are currently only connected by telephone. As of October 2008, only Banyinnaung has the system, which displays local prices for beans and pulses in real time. Domestic and international prices for edible oil crops, onions, garlic, potatoes, chili are expected to be added soon. Since August 2009, the Myanmar Pulses, Beans and Sesame Seed Merchants’ Association requires that all domestic and international transactions be concluded here at Bayinnaung Market.

== Links ==
Burma Markets Information Daily; accessed December 11, 2017.
