= Kanbawzathadi Palace =

Burmese Imperial Palace

Coordinates: 17.3306°N 96.4930°E

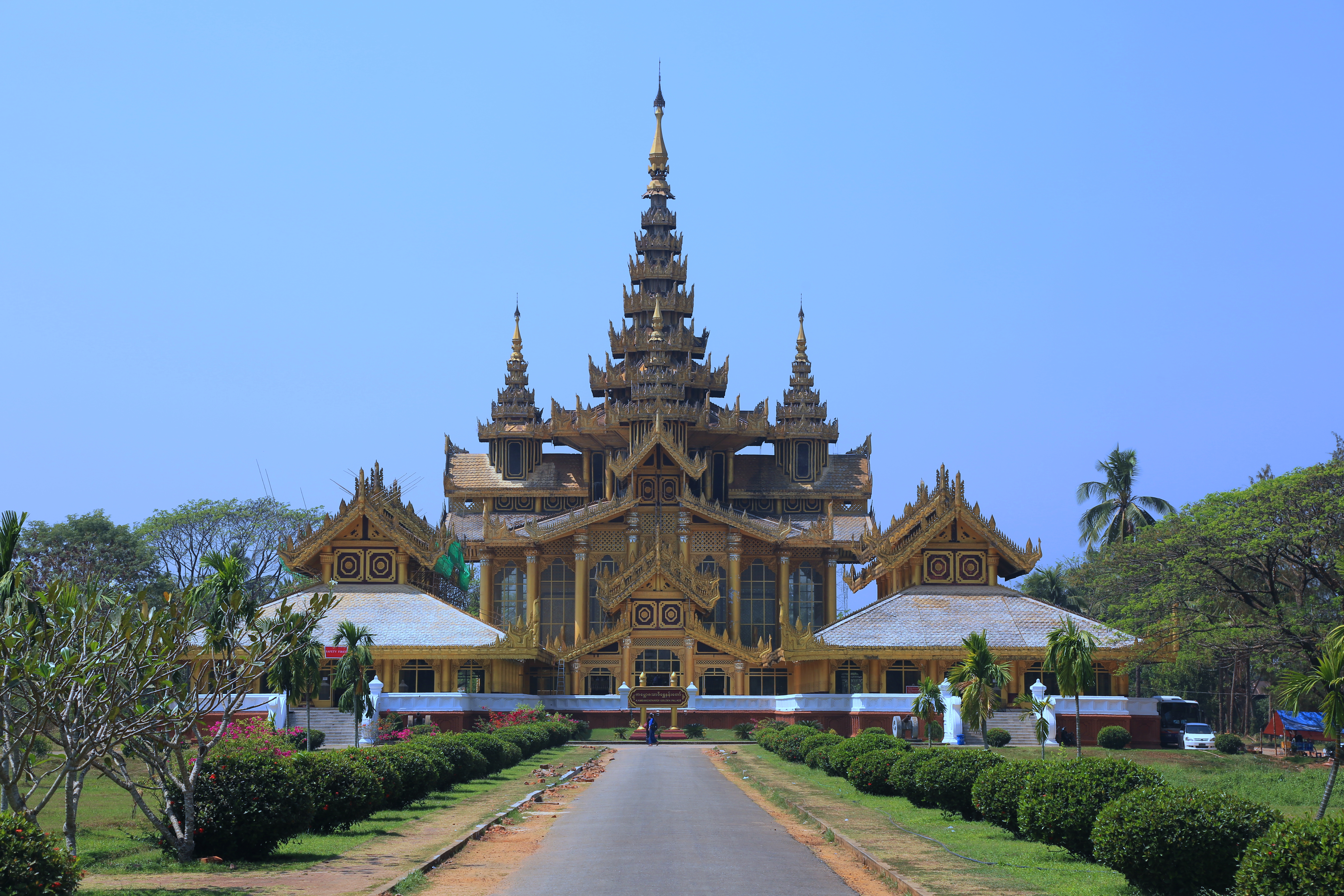
Kanbawzathadi Palace

Kanbawzathadi Palace (Burmese: ကမ္ဘောဇသာဒီ နန်းတော်, pronounced [kàɰ̃bɔ́za̰θədì ʃwè náɰ̃dɔ̀]) is a palace in Bago, Myanmar. The original palace, built for King Bayinnaung in 1556, consisted of 76 apartments and halls. It was burned down in 1599. The current building was reconstructed in 1990 and finished in 1992. It was rebuilt following the original design, based on knowledge gained from excavations and the original drawings of the building. The ornate palace gives an impression of the splendor and wealth of the second Burmese empire.

The reconstructed palace does not contain much of the original furniture and personal items used by the royals, as most of it was lost when the palace was looted and destroyed in 1599. There are several reproductions on display, like a replica of the king’s golden coach, decorated with two peacocks and a Pyatthat style roof.

== King Bayinnaung of the Taungoo dynasty ==
The palace dates from a very prosperous time in Burmese history. It was built by King Bayinnaung of the Taungoo dynasty, a vast empire that included much of present-day Burma, Thailand and parts of China.

Bayinnaung was one of Burma’s greatest rulers, a mighty King who possessed many white elephants, a sign of wealth and power at that time. The King even obtained a sacred Buddha tooth relic from Sri Lanka, which he had installed in the Mahazedi Pagoda. Bayinnaung built the new capital of the second Burmese empire, a large city called Hanthawadi (present day Bago) surrounded by walls with 20 gates. The palace was built on a 70 acres plot located at the center of the city. Construction started in 1553.

Records written by European visitors to the city tell about the magnificence and splendor of the richly gilded palace. Some of its buildings like the Great Audience Hall were roofed with gold plates.

The palace was looted and burnt down in 1599 during armed conflict. Its remains were abandoned, and the palace was not rebuild until the late 20th century. Excavation works started in 1990. Six mounds were excavated, revealing the brick foundations of several of the palace buildings. Several hundred of the original teak pillars used for the construction of the palace in the 16th century were found, many of them inscribed with Mon texts, as well as nearly 2,000 Buddha images.

== Reconstructed palace ==
Several buildings of the palace have been rebuilt. The Great Audience Hall was the largest building in the palace. It was the place where the King received his ministers and officials. The hall is also known as the Royal Lion Throne Hall, because it contained the Thihathana Throne or Lion Throne.

During excavations a number of 167 teak pillars were found, 135 of which are inscribed in Mon language with the names of towns, regions and people who donated them in the 16th century. The Great Audience Hall is a huge hall with rows of large pillars supporting the roof, its interior completely covered in gold paint. A copy of one of the Royal thrones as well as a number of the original 16th-century teak logs are exhibited.

The Bhammayarthana Throne Hall, also called Bee Throne Hall contained the private quarters for the King, including the Royal bed chamber and living chamber. This very ornate building has multiple roof sections and false floors, and is topped with a Pyatthat, a seven tiered Burmese style roof. Other buildings contained the chambers of members of the Royal family.

There used to be 9 Royal Thrones in the Kanbawzathadi Golden palace, each decorated with a different motif and used for different occasions. Eight of them were destroyed by fire, with the only surviving throne being the Thihathana Throne, also called Lion Throne because of the lion figures carved on it. The gilded, hardwood throne is on display in the National Museum in Yangon.

== Palace Museum ==
On the palace grounds is the Nandawya research museum, which exhibits items and artifacts found during the excavations, as well as information about the history of the second empire. On display are a number of the original 16th-century teak pillars and items like pottery, scales and weights used for commerce, ancient coins, glazed jars, swords and other weapons. The museum also contains a collection of 16th-century Buddha images in Mon, Siamese and Burmese styles from the palace.

== In popular culture ==
There are replicas of the royal throne room hall and Vihāra and temples of the Hanthawaddy royal palace for filming movies or TV dramas containing content related to royal Myanmar in Prommitr film studio which is located inside Surasi Military camp, Lat Ya sub districts, Mueang Kanchanaburi district, Kanchanaburi province. The purpose of the building was to be used for filming The Legend of King Naresuan for the first time. and is used for filming movies or TV dramas containing scenes related to the Burmese kingdom in Thai movies or TV dramas.
