= Bad St. Leonhard im Lavanttal =

- Municipality
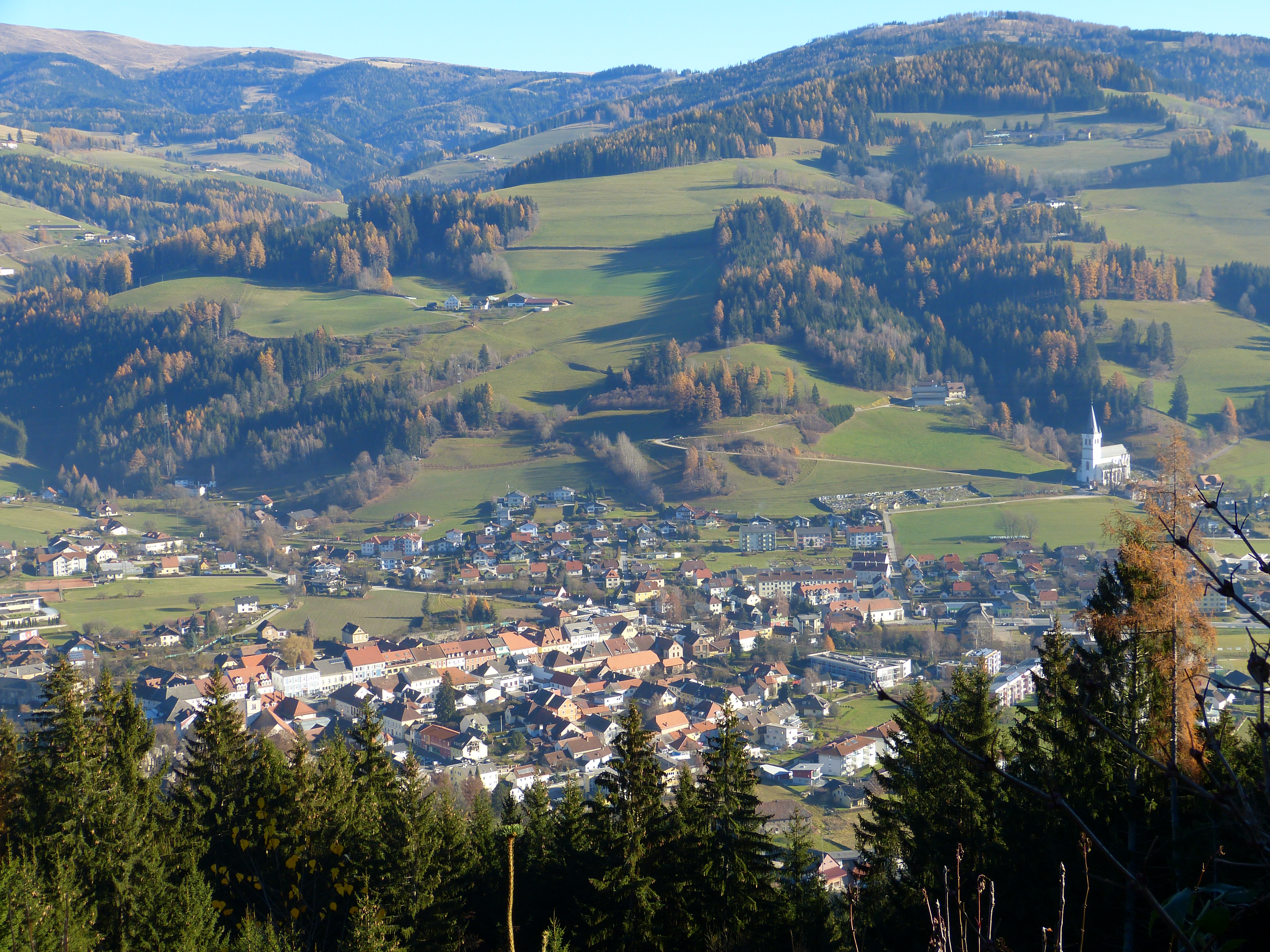
- View over Bad Sankt Leonhard

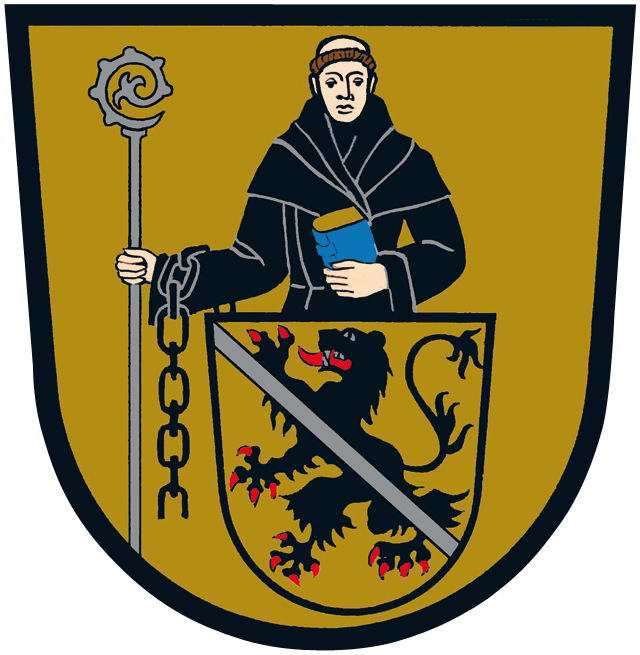
- Coat of arms

- Location within Austria
- Coordinates: 46°58′N 14°48′E
- Country: Austria
- State: Carinthia
- District: Wolfsberg

Government
  - Mayor: Simon Maier (SPÖ)

Area
  - Total: 111.82 km^{2} (43.17 sq mi)
- Elevation: 721 m (2,365 ft)

Population (2018-01-01)
  - Total: 4,375
  - Density: 39.13/km^{2} (101.3/sq mi)
- Time zone: UTC+1 (CET)
  - Summer (DST): UTC+2 (CEST)
- Postal code: 9462
- Area code: 04250
- Website: www.bad-st-leonhard-i-lav.at

Bad St. Leonhard im Lavanttal (Slovene: Sveti Lenart v Labotu) is a spa town in the district of Wolfsberg in the Austrian state of Carinthia.

== Geography ==
The municipality lies in the upper Lavant valley (Lavanttal) north of the district capital Wolfsberg. The municipal area comprises the cadastral communities of Erzberg, Görlitzen, Kliening, Bad Sankt Leonhard proper, Schiefling, Schönberg, Theißing, and Twimberg.

Bad St. Leonhard has access to the Süd Autobahn (A2). The Lavant Viaduct across the valley was inaugurated in 1986; with a height of 165 m (541 ft), it is the second highest bridge in Austria.

== History ==
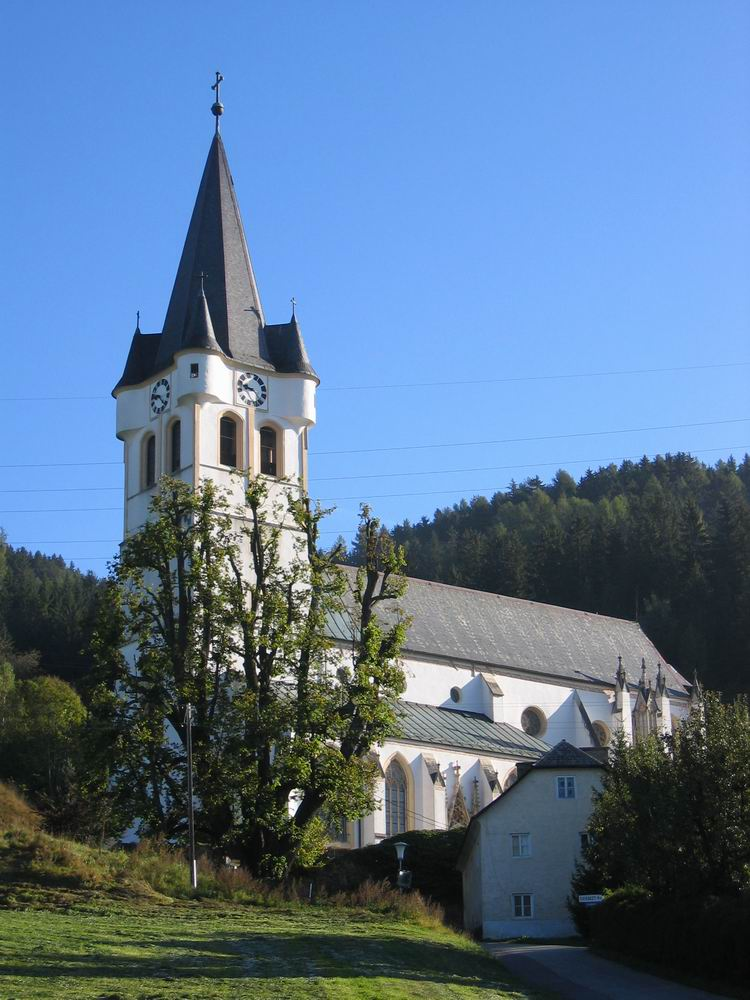
St Leonard's Church

The area was settled since ancient times, when a Roman road led through the Lavanttal up to the Obdach Saddle pass and the Mur valley in present-day Upper Styria. In the 11th century, the surrounding Carinthian estates were enfeoffed to the Bishops of Bamberg by Emperor Henry II.

A first chapel dedicated to Saint Leonard was consecrated during the tenure of Bishop Otto (1102–1139). His successors also had Gomarn Castle erected in order to protect their possessions, mainly from the rivalling Bishops of Lavant who resided at nearby Twimberg Castle. The settlement below the chapel was first mentioned in a 1278 deed, its citizens already had received town privileges by 1311, at the time when the Gothic parish church was erected.

In the 15th century, mining for gold and silver became common in the area, run by the Fugger merchant family from Augsburg. Also, Sankt Leonhard became known for its mineral springs (Preblauer); the waters were mentioned by the physician Paracelsus in 1538. The Bamberg bishops finally sold the estates to the Habsburg empress Maria Theresa in 1759. Sankt Leonhard received the official status of a spa town (Bad) in 1935.

During the Great Depression in the 1930s, several medieval stained glass windows of the parish church were sold and are now on display at The Cloisters museum in New York City.

== Politics ==
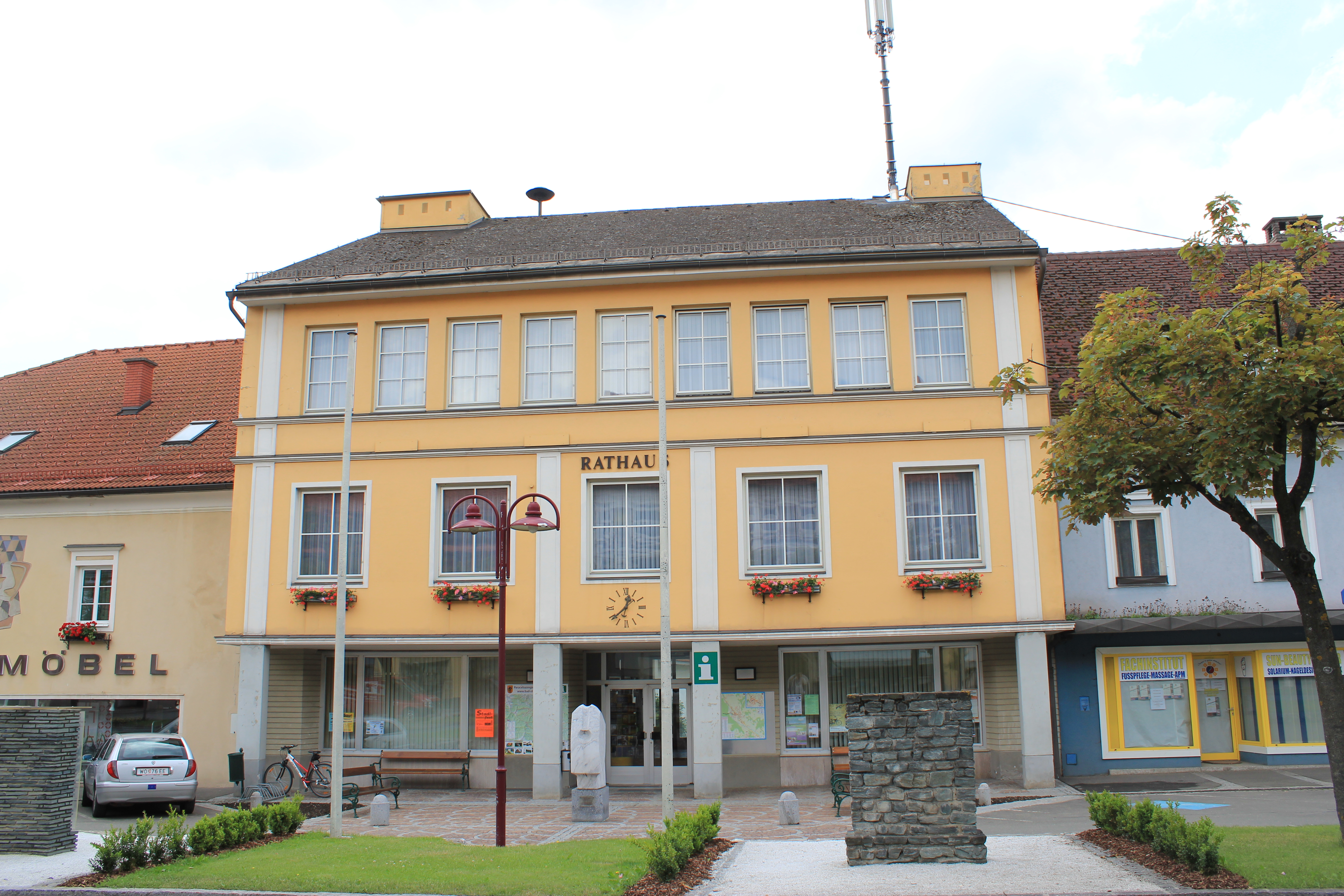
Town hall

Seats in the municipal council (Gemeinderat) as of 2015 local elections:

- Social Democratic Party of Austria (SPÖ): 12
- Liste Dieter Dohr (independent): 6
- Austrian People's Party (ÖVP): 4
- The Greens – The Green Alternative: 1

== Notable people ==
- Johann Tobias Bürg (1766–1835), astronomer, lived and died at Wiesenau Castle
- Inge Sargent (1932–2023), last Mahadevi of Hsipaw
