= Tho Kyaung Bwa =

Ruler of Onbaung, 1400s–1420s?

Tho Kyaung Bwa သိုကြောင်ဘွား Sao Kem Hpa

Sawbwa of Onbaung
- Reign: by 1404/05 – 1420s?
- Predecessor: ?
- Successor: Le Than Bwa (Hsan Hpa)
- Monarch: Minkhaung I
- Born: Unknown; Onbaung?
- Died: 1420s? Onbaung
- Spouses: Sanda of Ava
- Religion: Theravada Buddhism

Tho Kyaung Bwa (Burmese: သိုကြောင်ဘွား, Burmese pronunciation: [ðò dʑàʊɴ bwá], also known as Sao Kem Hpa) was sawbwa (ruler) of Onbaung (Hsipaw) from c. 1400s to c. 1420s. He was a vassal and/or ally of King Minkhaung I of Ava.

== Standard chronicle narrative ==
According to the standard royal chronicles, Tho Kyaung Bwa became a vassal of Ava in 1404/05. In a marriage of state, he married a niece of King Minkhaung I of Ava. In 1412, the sawbwa reported to the Ava court that the neighboring Shan state of Hsenwi, backed by Ming China, had invaded Onbaung. In response, Minkhaung dispatched Crown Prince Minye Kyawswa to drive out the Hsenwi and Chinese forces.

The next ruler of Onbaung mentioned in the standard royal chronicles is Le Than Bwa (Hsan Hpa) in 1425. The main chronicles do not specify the exact date Tho Kyaung Bwa ceased to be the sawbwa, or his relationship, if any, to Le Than Bwa.

== Hsipaw chronicle narrative ==
The Shan language chronicle Hsipaw Yazawin (Onbaung Hsipaw Chronicle) however says that Tho Kyaung Bwa was an ally of King Minkhaung. According to the chronicle, it was Minkhaung that submitted to the sawbwa in February 1415 after the sawbwa had marched and encamped in Sagaing across from the capital Ava (Inwa). The king of Ava gave his niece, Sanda, in marriage to Tho Kyaung Bwa. (Note: (Fernquest 2006) contains inconsistent information. (Fernquest 2006: 54) states that the marriage alliance came in February 1415, citing the Onbaung chronicle via (Aung Tun 2004: 153–154). But (Fernquest 2006: 58) says that the marriage between Sao Kem Hpa and Sanda was in 1393, without providing a citation. It is unclear if the source chronicle provides two different dates, or if one of his dates is a typographical error. The chronicle also claims that his son Hsan Hpa married Sanda after his death.) The chronicle also says Tho Kyaung Bwa he was the father of Hsan Hpa (Le Than Bwa), the next sawbwa of Onbaung–Hsipaw.

== Bibliography ==
- Aung Tun, Sai (2009). History of the Shan State: From Its Origins to 1962. Chiang Mai: Silk Worm Books. ISBN 978-974-9511-43-5.
- Fernquest, Jon (Autumn 2006). "Crucible of War: Burma and the Ming in the Tai Frontier Zone (1382–1454)" (PDF). SOAS Bulletin of Burma Research. 4 (2).
- Harvey, G. E. (1925). History of Burma: From the Earliest Times to 10 March 1824. London: Frank Cass & Co. Ltd.
- Kala, U (2006) [1724]. Maha Yazawin (in Burmese). Vol. 1–3 (4th printing ed.). Yangon: Ya-Pyei Publishing.
- Maha Sithu (2012) [1798]. Myint Swe; Kyaw Win; Thein Hlaing (eds.). Yazawin Thit (in Burmese). Vol. 1–3 (2nd printing ed.). Yangon: Ya-Pyei Publishing.
- Royal Historical Commission of Burma (2003) [1832]. Hmannan Yazawin (in Burmese). Vol. 1–3. Yangon: Ministry of Information, Myanmar.

Tho Kyaung Bwa Ava Kingdom Died: 1420s?
Royal titles
Preceded by ?	Sawbwa of Onbaung by 1404/05 – 1420s?	Succeeded by Le Than Bwa?
