= Hsipaw Palace =

Former palace in Shan State, Myanmar

- သီပေါဟော်
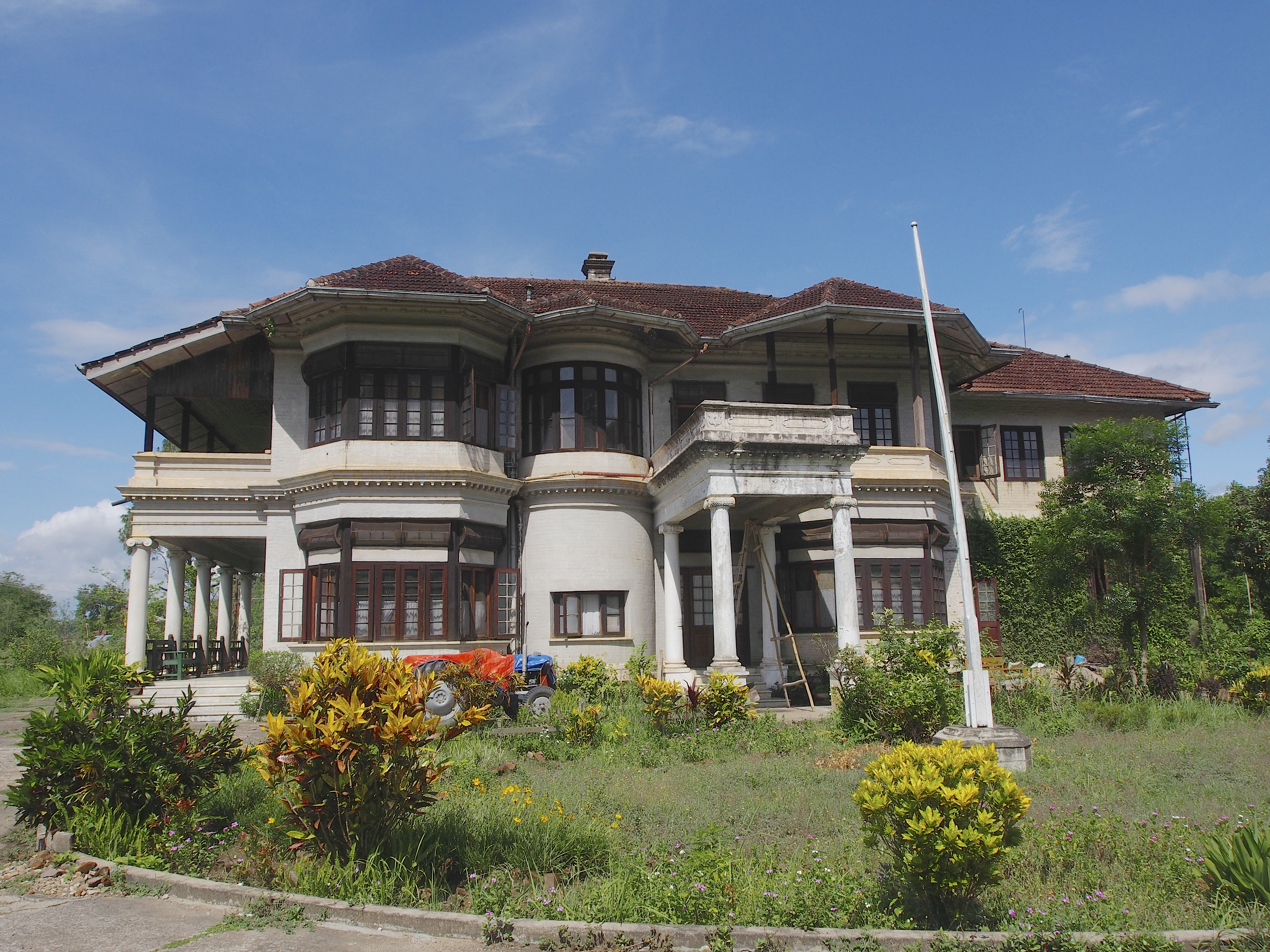
- Interactive map of the Hsipaw Palace area

General information
- Location: Hsipaw, Shan State, Myanmar
- Coordinates: 22.626°N 97.305°E
- Completed: 1924

Hsipaw Palace, also known as the Hsipaw Haw (Burmese: သီပေါဟော်) or East Haw, is the former residence of the ruler of Hsipaw State, a principality in Burma (now Myanmar). Built in the style of an English country villa on a 5-acre compound, the palace is best known for being the residence of Sao Kya Seng and his consort Inge Sargent, and is the sole remaining palace in Hsipaw today.

== History ==
Hsipaw Palace was built by Sao Ohn Kya in 1924. It was the third of three palaces or (haw in Shan) constructed in Hsipaw, the others built by Sao Khun Sai in 1888, and Sakhantha Palace, built by Sao Khe in 1922. Sakhantha Palace, located in the village of Sakhantha, was used as a summer retreat by the ruling family and is built in the neoclassical style. The palace's left wing was burned down during World War II, while the rest of the building remains intact.

Following the 1962 Burmese coup d'état, Sao Kya Seng was detained by authorities. His family vacated the palace premises in 1963, after 11 months of house arrest. In 1972, Sao Kya Seng's nephew Sao Oo Kya moved into the former palace, which was open to the public in 1996.
