= Twilight Over Burma =

Austrian Film

- Poster
- Burmese: မှုန်ရီဆိုင်းတိုင်းမြန်မာ
- Directed by: Sabine Derflinger
- Screenplay by: Rupert Henning
- Based on: Twilight Over Burma: My Life as a Shan Princess by Inge Sargent
- Produced by: Isabelle Welter, Alfred Deutsch
- Music by: Stefan Schrupp
- Release date: October 26, 2015
- Running time: 99 minutes
- Country: Austria
- Languages: English, Austrian German

Twilight Over Burma (Burmese: မြန်မာ့ဆည်းဆာ) is a 2015 Austrian biographical film based on the eponymous novel, an autobiography written by Inge Sargent, the Austrian-born consort of Sao Kya Seng, the last saopha of Hsipaw. The film was directed by Sabine Derflinger and produced by Dor Film; it premiered in Austria on October 26, 2015.

== Plot ==
Inge Sargent, an Austrian student and Sao Kya Seng, a young mining student from Burma fall in love. But it is only at the lavish wedding ceremony that Inge discovers her husband is the ruling prince of Hsipaw, a princely state in Burma. After a coup is staged by the Burmese military, Sao is imprisoned. Inge does everything she can to free him.

== Cast ==
- Daweerit Chullasapya as Sao Kya Seng
- Maria Ehrich as Inge Sargent
- Sahajak Boonthanakit as General Ne Win
- Tanapol Chuksrida as Kawlin
- Regina Fritsch as Mutter
- Kaitlin Orem as Mayari
- Jirapat Phanngoen as Bukong
- Patrik Plenk as Reisender

== Controversy ==
In June 2016, the film was banned by the Burmese Motion Picture Classification Board from screening at the Human Rights Human Dignity International Festival in Yangon for purportedly damaging "ethnic unity within the state." The following month, Thailand followed suit; the Thailand International Film Destination Festival canceled a viewing of Twilight Over Burma without explanation, in order to preserve bilateral relations between Thailand and Myanmar.
