= Inge Sargent =

Last queen consort of Hsipaw (r. 1957–1959)

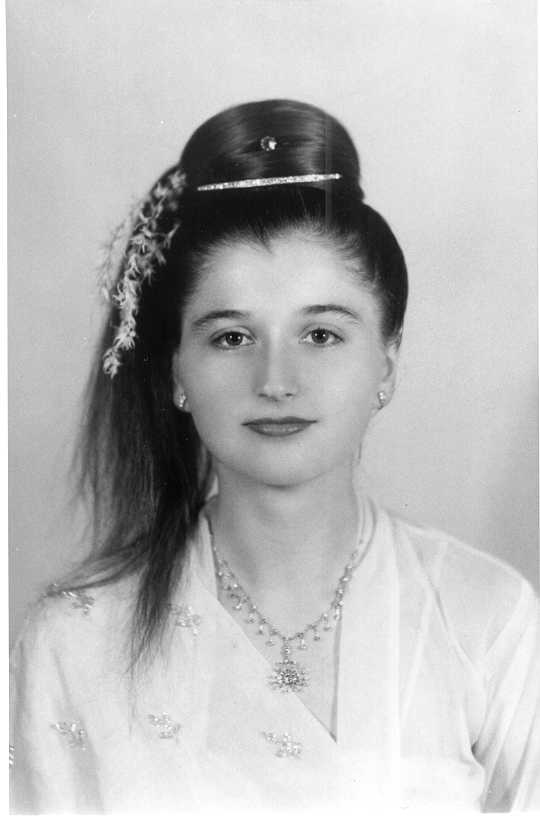
- Sargent, c. 1954

Queen consort of Hsipaw
- Tenure: 2 November 1957 – 1959
- Successor: Position abolished
- Born: Inge Eberhard; 23 February 1932; Bad Sankt Leonhard, Austria
- Died: 5 February 2023 (aged 90); Boulder, Colorado, U.S.
- Spouse: Sao Kya Seng (m. 1953; disappeared 1962); Howard "Tad" Sargent (m. 1968; died 2022)
- Issue: Sao Mayari; Sao Kennari
- Dynasty: Hsipaw State
- Religion: Theravada Buddhism
- Occupation: Author; human-rights activist

Inge Sargent (born Inge Eberhard; 23 February 1932 – 5 February 2023), also known as Sao Nang Thu Sandi (Burmese: စဝ်သုစန္ဒီ), was an Austrian and American author and human-rights activist who was the last Mahadevi of Hsipaw, reigning from 1957 until 1959.

== Early life ==
Eberhard was born on 23 February 1932, in Bad Sankt Leonhard im Lavanttal, Austria. Her father was a forest ranger. When she was six years old, the Nazis annexed her homeland, and her mother was arrested by them on three occasions.

Following World War II, Eberhard decided to study in the United States. In 1951, she received one of the first Austrian Fulbright Scholarships and enrolled at Colorado Women's College.

== Mahadevi ==
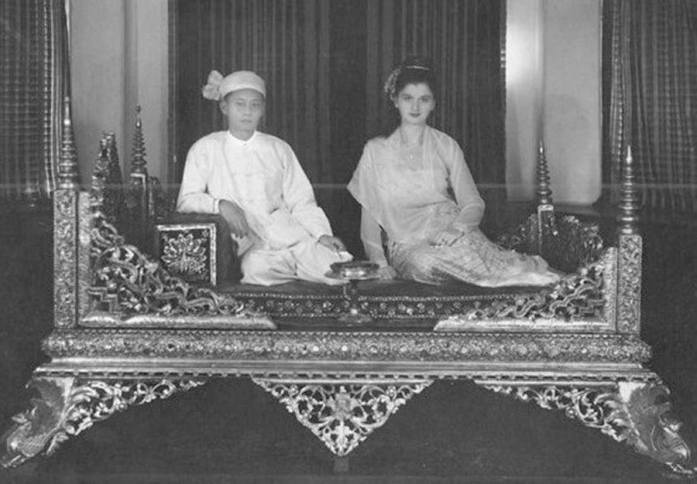
Sao Kya Seng and Mahadevi Sao Nang Thu Sandi, c. 1957

At a party for international students, Eberhard met Sao Kya Seng, an engineering student from Burma who attended the Colorado School of Mines. The couple married on 7 March 1953 at the home of a friend in Colorado.

Following his graduation, the couple moved to Burma. Hundreds of people had gathered at the port of Rangoon to welcome the couple as they arrived on the SS Warwickshire. It was then that her husband revealed that he was the prince of Hsipaw, a princely state in Burma and close to the border with China, which he had previously concealed from her. On November 2, 1957, at the Hsipaw Palace, the couple was officially installed as Saohpalong (Great Lord of the Sky) and Mahadevi (Celestial Princess) of Hsipaw.

Aage Krarup Nielsen, a Danish writer who explored Hsipaw in the late 1950s, expressed in his book "The Land of the Golden Pagodas" that, "It was at first somewhat of a shock for many local people to get a young European lady as their princess but before long, their reserve melted and their Mahadevi today is admired by the entire people of Hsipaw, who regard her as one of their own."

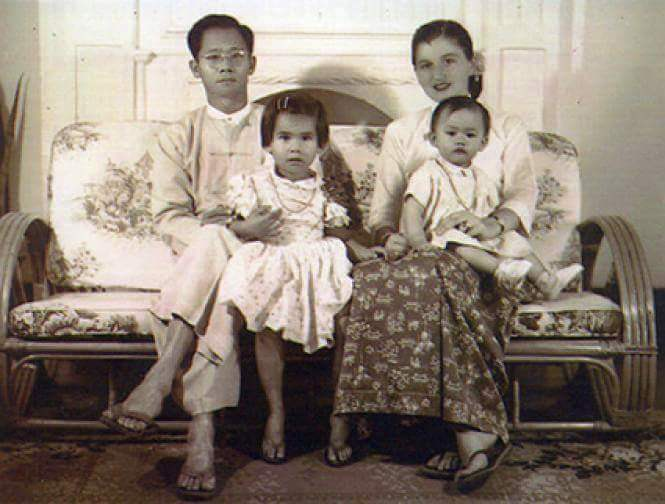
Sao Kya Seng and Inge Eberhard (Sao Nang Thu Sandi) with their two daughters, c. 1955

She learned to speak Shan and Burmese, and worked to improve life in Hsipaw. She became involved in charitable projects such as establishing birthing clinics (called "Hsipaw Maternity and Child Welfare Society"), teaching villagers better nutrition, and starting a trilingual school. She was also selected to be the president of the Mother and Child Association and her work reduced the infant mortality rate. After nine years as rulers of Hsipaw, the couple had two daughters, Sao Mayari and Sao Kennari. The couple's altruistic efforts quickly made them two of Southeast Asia's best-loved rulers.

In 1962, the Burmese army staged a coup under the leadership of General Ne Win. The day before the coup, Sao Kya Seng had attended Parliament in Rangoon and had flown to Taunggyi to visit his dying sister. He was arrested and imprisoned, and Inge and her two daughters were put under house arrest for two years on suspicion of her being a CIA spy. Her bodyguards and drivers were beaten with rifle butts. During these years, she worked tirelessly to discover what happened to her husband, eventually learning that he had been killed in prison. In 1964, she fled with her daughters to Austria with the help of an Austrian embassy official and forged passports.

Upon returning to Austria, she secured a position at the Thai embassy in Vienna, persistently working to unveil the destiny of her husband. Her daughters experienced racism in Austria.

== Later life ==
After living with her parents for two years, in 1966 Eberhard decided to return to Colorado and she became a high-school German teacher at Centennial Junior High School and Fairview High School in Boulder. She retired from her teaching career in 1993.

When General Ne Win visited Vienna in June 1966 for psychiatric treatment under the care of psychiatrist Dr. Hans Hoff, she went to Schloss Laudon, where Ne Win was staying. She attempted to meet with Ne Win to inquire about what had happened to her husband, Sao Kya Seng. However, Ne Win declined to meet her.

In 1968, Eberhard met and married her second husband Howard "Tad" Sargent, a scientist and expert on Antarctica, who encouraged her to write her biography. Her memoir Twilight over Burma was published in 1994. All profits from her book were donated to Burmese refugees living near the borders of Myanmar. She says writing it was a cathartic experience: "Before I wrote the book I used to have nightmares of running with my two little girls while bullets flew past us. But since finishing the book, the nightmares have ended." An Austrian film adaptation of the book, Twilight Over Burma, was created in 2015 and starred Maria Ehrich as Eberhard and Daweerit Chullasapya as Sao Kya Seng. The film adaptation was banned in both Myanmar and Thailand.

In the initial months of 1988, amid Burma's impending unrest, Sao Nang Thu Sandi made a return to Chiang Mai, marking her first visit to Southeast Asia since 1964. Exiles from Hsipaw, residing in northern Thailand, warmly welcomed her at a Chiang Mai hotel, leaving her visibly touched by the genuine affection she received. Touched by the experience, Sao Nang Thu Sandi inquired if there was any way she could assist them in the United States. A participant highlighted that the aid provided by Washington to the Burmese military under the pretext of combating drugs was disastrous. The support ostensibly aimed at fighting drugs resulted in the suffering of poor opium farmers, while the military shielded the main traffickers. Coincidentally, someone close to her was associated with Senator Daniel Patrick Moynihan, the former US ambassador to India. Sao Nang Thu Sandi initiated the process, and through her acquaintance, Moynihan requested a comprehensive investigation into US assistance to Burma. The General Accounting Office conducted the investigation, and the findings were disclosed in a report dated September 1989, titled "Drug Control: Enforcement Efforts in Burma Are Not Effective".

In 1995, Sargent and her husband established the Burma Lifeline Foundation, a charity that aimed to raise funds to help those fleeing the military regime in Burma. In 2000, she was awarded the International Human Rights Award for her continued support for ethnic minorities and for the founding of the Burma Lifeline Foundation. She was the subject of documentary, The Last Mahadevi, in 1999. In 2008, she founded the Sao Thusandi Leadership Award, providing crucial support to emerging young community leaders in Shan State. She persistently wrote letters to the Burmese civilian president, Thein Sein, seeking information about Sao Kya Seng. Unfortunately, these letters were consistently ignored.

Sargent died at home in Boulder, Colorado, on 5 February 2023, at age 90.

== Books ==
- 1992: The Prince of Hsipaw: A True Story of Burma (ISBN 9781870838610)
- 1994: Twilight Over Burma: My Life as a Shan Princess (ISBN 9780824816285)

== Films ==
- The Last Mahadevi (1999 documentary)
- Twilight Over Burma (2015 biographical film)
