= Bawgyo Pagoda =

Buddhist Pagoda in Shan, Myanmar

- ဘော်ကြိုဘုရားကြီး
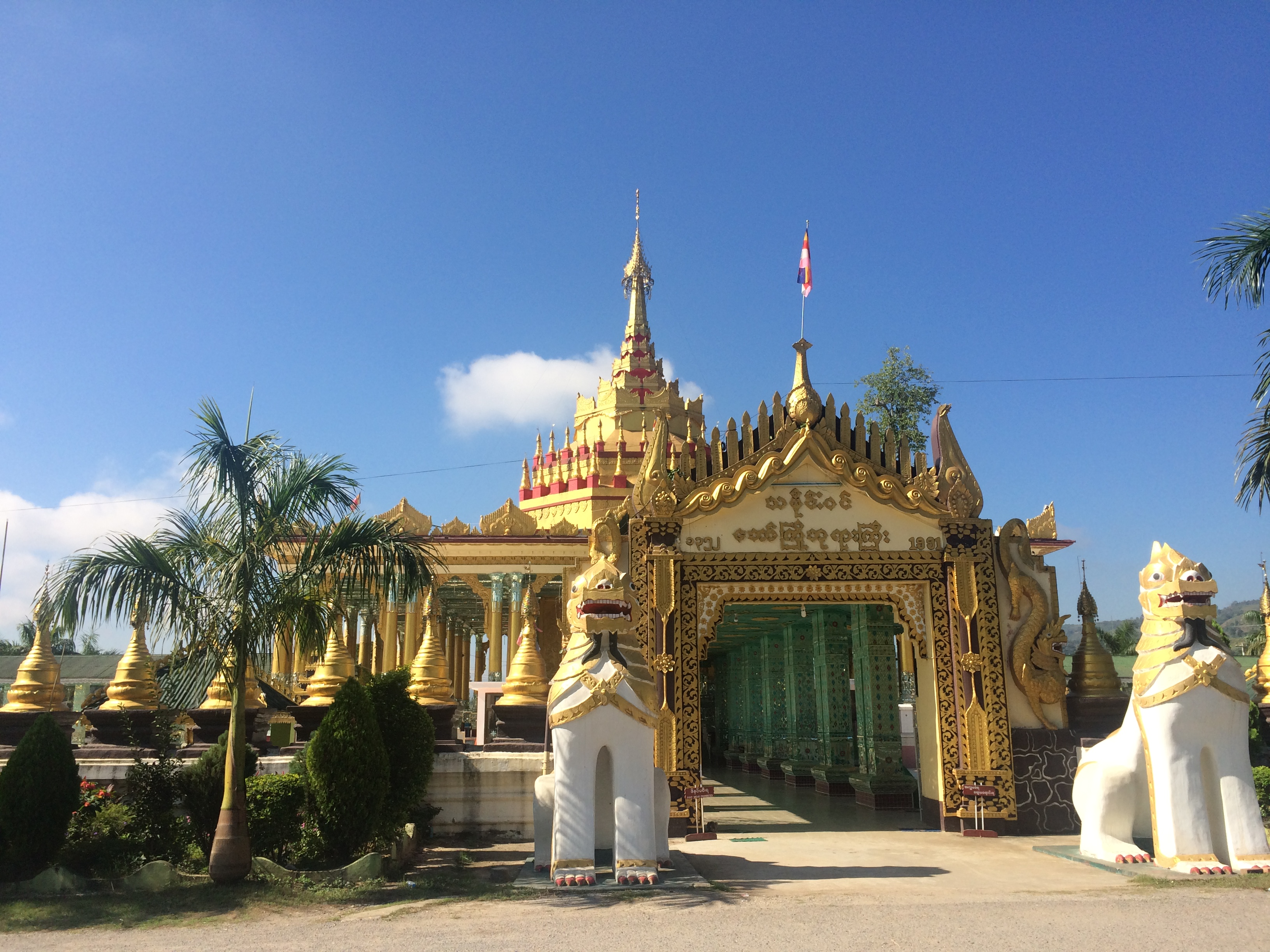

- Location within Myanmar

Religion
- Affiliation: Buddhism
- Sect: Theravada Buddhism
- Region: Hsipaw, Hsipaw State
- Status: active

Location
- Country: Myanmar
- Coordinates: 22.583790°N 97.233756°E

Architecture
- Established: 12th century; ~900 years ago

The Bawgyo Pagoda (Burmese: ဘော်ကြိုဘုရားကြီး) is a Buddhist temple in Hsipaw, Myanmar. Built in the 12th century, the temple is located in Bawgyo village, several miles from the town of Hsipaw. Every March, the temple is the site of a Buddhist festival that commemorates the pagoda's founding.

The pagoda underwent significant renovation in 1995-1996, under the direction of Khin Nyunt.
