= Khun Htun Oo =

Burmese politician (1943–2022)

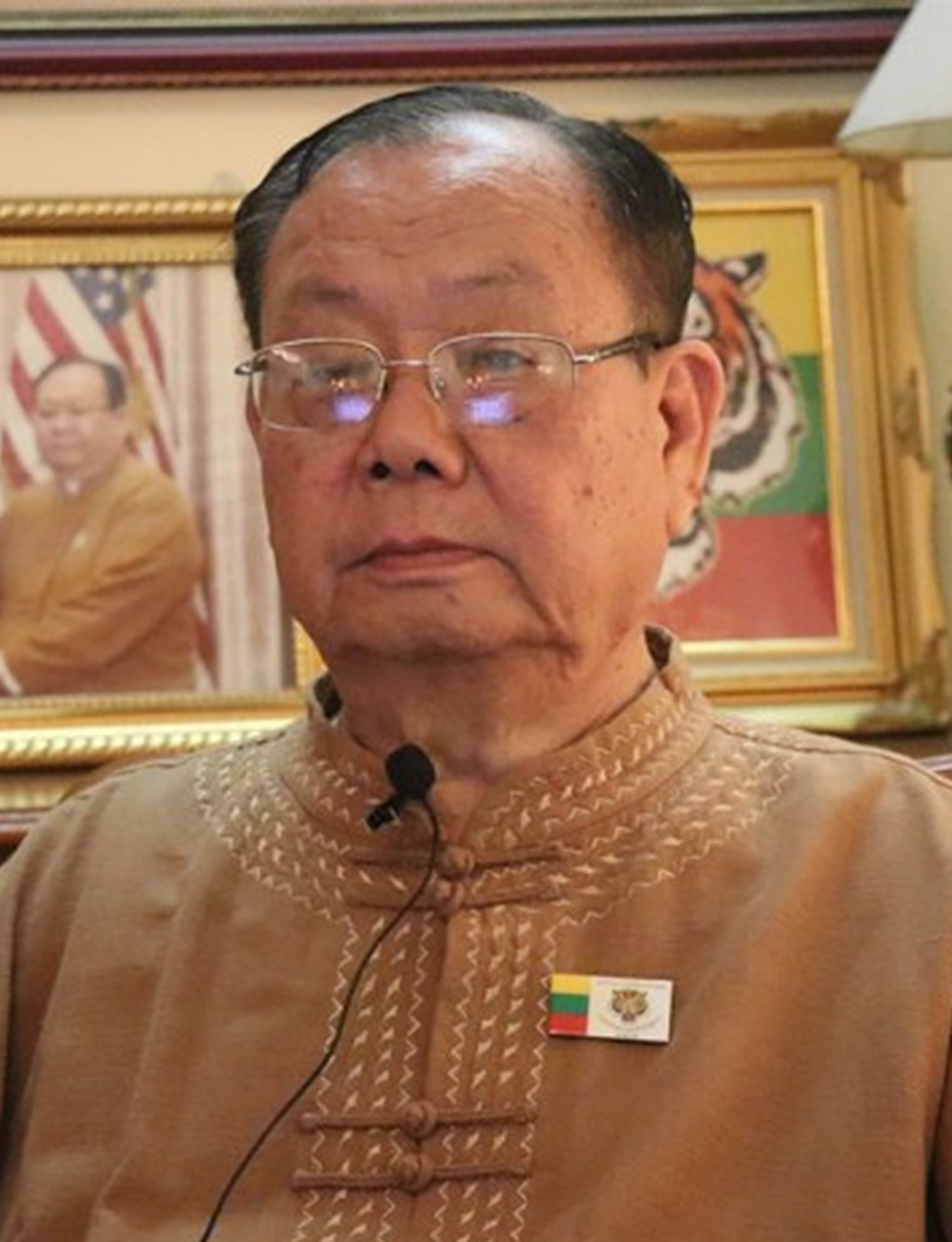
- Born: 11 September 1943; Hsipaw, Burma
- Died: 30 April 2022 (aged 78); His residence at 9 mile, Yangon, Myanmar.
- Citizenship: Myanmar
- Education: St.Elbert, Maymyo; Kambawza College, Taunggyi
- Alma mater: Rangoon University
- Occupation: Politician
- Years active: 1988 – 2022
- Known for: Political prisoner; Pro-democracy activism; Politician
- Parent(s): Sao Kyar Hzon (father); Sao Shwe Yone (mother)

Khun Htun Oo (Burmese: ခွန်ထွန်းဦးpronounced [kʰʊ̀ɰ̃ tʰʊ́ɰ̃ ʔú], Shan: ၸဝ်ႈၶုၼ်ထုၼ်းဢူ, 11 September 1943 – 30 April 2022) was a chairman of Shan Nationalities League for Democracy (SNLD) and a politician who was imprisoned in 2005 for treason, defamation, and inciting dissatisfaction with the Burmese government. His sentence was protested by numerous Western governments and the human rights group Amnesty International, which named him a prisoner of conscience.

== Background ==
Khun Htun Oo was ethnically Shan (Tai), and was born in 1943 in Hsipaw Northern Shan State. He was the nephew of Sao Kya Seng, the last Saopha of Hsipaw who was arrested in 1962 after General Ne Win's 1962 Burmese coup d'état and never seen again. He pursued a Bachelor of Laws at Rangoon University in 1964 before serving as assistant to the Indonesian military attaché in Burma. Khun Htun Oo went on to become "the most senior political representative of the Shan".

After pro-democracy, anti-government protests toppled Ne Win's military dictatorship in 1988, Khun Tun Oo stood for the 1990 parliamentary elections at the head of the Shan Nationalities League for Democracy (SNLD) party. His party gained 23 seats (220,835 votes), and within Shan State, finished ahead of even Aung San Suu Kyi's National League for Democracy (NLD), which had won 59.9% of the vote nationwide. However, the military government annulled the results, the parliament never convened, and the generals continued to rule the country as the State Peace and Development Council (SPDC).

== Activism, arrest, and trial ==
Eight years after the annulment of the election results, SNLD and 3 other ethnic parties worked on a coalition agreement with the NLD. This coalition urged the SPDC to negotiate with the NLD over human rights, but these efforts did not succeed, and Khun Htun Oo's party ultimately urged politicians to boycott the SPDC's coming National Convention. In a 2002 interview with BBC News, he described his party's ultimate objective as "the establishment of a multi-party democratic system". That same year, he publicly protested the exclusion of Burma's ethnic minorities from Union Day celebrations.

Khun Htun Oo's opposition to the government eventually led to his arrest. On 7 February 2005—Shan National Day—Khun Htun Oo met several other politicians for a meal, over which they discussed the SPDC's plans for the coming national transition. He was arrested two days later on charges of "high treason" and "inciting disaffection towards the Government". The other leaders present at the meeting were arrested as well.

In November of that year, the group was tried in a closed trial at Insein Prison. Khun Htun Oo was found guilty on all charges and sentenced to 93 years' imprisonment. Amnesty International criticized the trial as falling "far short of international fair trial standards", noting that the defendants were denied access to family and their own lawyers.

== Imprisonment and international attention ==
Khun Htun Oo and the other Shan State leaders were sent to different prisons in remote area of Burma, hundreds of miles from their hometowns. From 2005 to 2011, Khun Htun Oo was held in Putao prison in northernmost Kachin State where temperature falls below zero in winter. According to reports released from the prison, despite having diabetes and gout he received little medical attention, and was also suffering from swollen legs due to lack of exercise, as well as ischemic heart disease. Amnesty International reported that he also suffers from a peptic ulcer and arthritis. On 9 February 2010, the Democratic Voice of Burma reported that Khun Htun Oo was "losing hair and weight," dropping from around 160 lbs. to around 120 lbs., and on 10 February 2011, that his health was "deteriorating".

Amnesty International named Khun Htun Oo as a prisoner of conscience, and as of May 2011, continued to publicize his case. He was also made an honorary Italian citizen by the mayor of Monza on 10 December 2008. A 2010 United Nations draft resolution calling by name for the freedom of Khun Htun Oo and other political prisoners was co-sponsored by Australia, Austria, Belgium, Canada, Denmark, Finland, France, Germany, Greece, Italy, Netherlands, New Zealand, Norway, Spain, Sweden, Switzerland, Great Britain and the US. In March 2011, Khun Htun Oo was awarded the Nationalities Hero prize by the United Nationalities Alliance, a group representing several minorities of Burma, for his "dedication and struggle for ethnic groups and national reconciliation".

== Release ==
Khun Htun Oo was released on 13 January 2012 in a mass presidential pardon of political prisoners.

== Death ==
According to the Shan Nationalities League for Democracy's official Facebook page, Khun Htun Oo had died on 30 April 2022 in the afternoon around 1:00PM in the house where he resided, located in 9 Mile, Yangon. The SNLD spokesperson, U Saing Latt, commented that it is a huge loss for the Shan people.
