= Le Than Bwa =

Ruler of Onbaung, 1420s–1459/60

Le Than Bwa လယ်သံဘွား Hsan Hpa

Sawbwa of Onbaung
- Reign: by 1425 – 1459/60
- Predecessor: Tho Kyaung Bwa
- Successor: Kham Yut Bwa
- Monarch: Thihathu (1421?–1425); Min Nyo (1425–1426); Narapati I (1444–1459/60)
- Born: 1400s? Onbaung?
- Died: 1459/60; 821 ME; Onbaung
- Issue: Kham Yut Bwa
- Father: Tho Kyaung Bwa
- Religion: Theravada Buddhism

Le Than Bwa (Burmese: လယ်သံဘွား, Burmese pronunciation: [lɛ̀ ðàɴ bwá]; also known as Hsan Hpa, died 1459/60) was sawbwa (ruler) of Onbaung from the 1420s to 1459/60. Initially a vassal of Ava, the sawbwa kept his small Shan-speaking state independent from 1426 to 1444. He is known in Burmese history for his 1425 assassination of King Thihathu of Ava.

The assassination paved the way for his ally Prince Min Nyo of Kale to seize the Ava throne three months later. However, he deserted Nyo at a critical juncture in the subsequent war between Nyo and Gov. Thado of Mohnyin in 1426, clearing the way for Thado's accession. Yet he never submitted to Thado, and exerted pressure on Ava by actively supporting the rebellion of Prince Minye Kyawhtin to the 1440s. But the Chinese invasions forced him to submit to Ava in 1444. He died in 1459/60, and was succeeded by his son Kham Yut Bwa with Ava's military help.

== Background ==
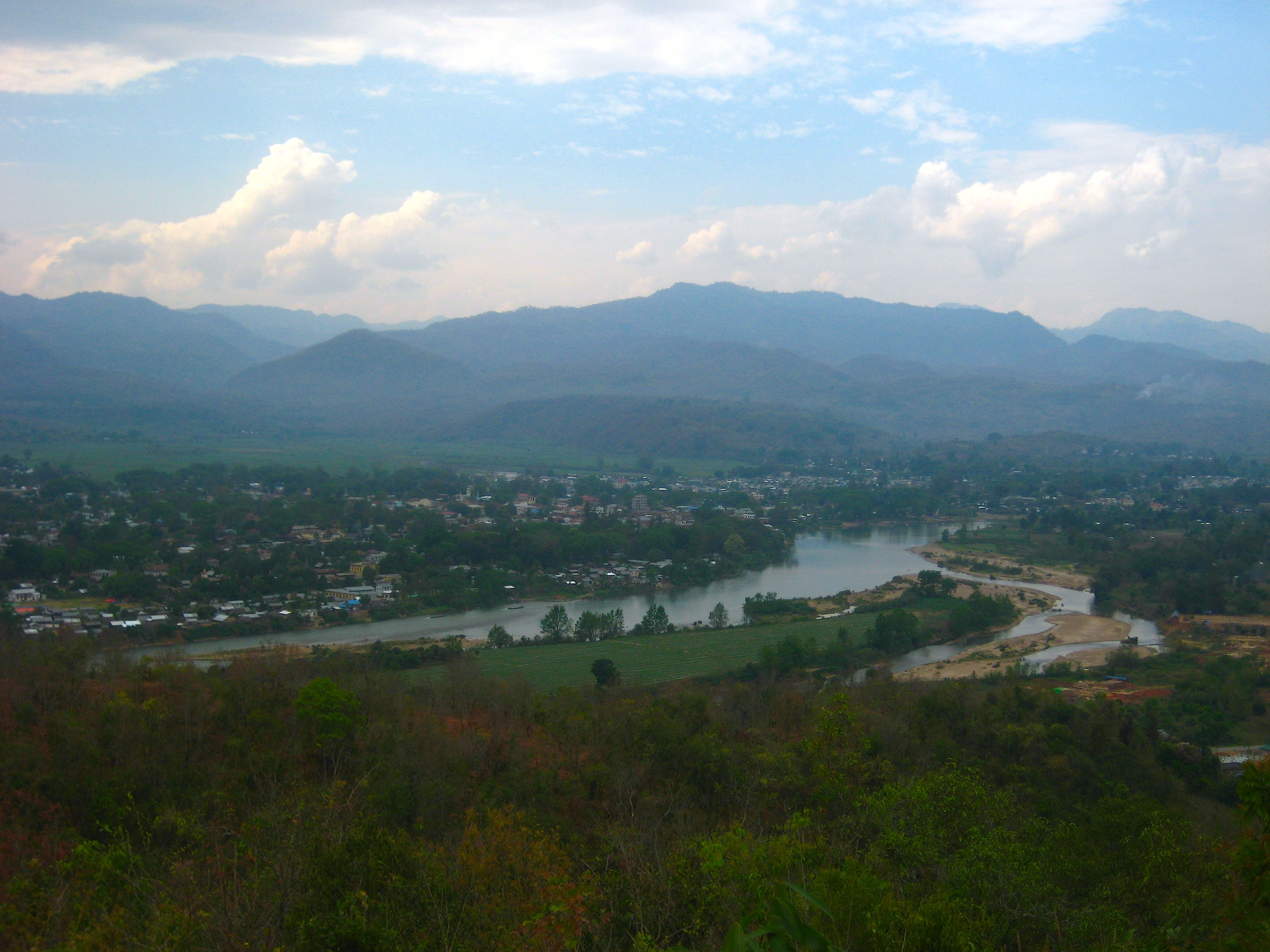
Onbaung, present day Hsipaw (Thibaw)

The royal chronicles mention nothing about his background. The first mention of Le Than Bwa (or Hsan Hpa in Shan) in the chronicles is when he was already the sawbwa (ruler) of Onbaung (Hsipaw/Thibaw), a Shan-speaking vassal state of Ava, in 1425. Presumably, he was related to Tho Kyaung Bwa, the sawbwa of Onbaung in the 1400s and 1410s, and succeeded him. (Note: (Hmannan Vol. 1 2003: 446): Tho Kyaung Bwa submitted to King Minkhaung I of Ava in 766 ME (1404/05). The sawbwa was still alive in 774 ME (1412/13) per (Hmannan Vol. 2 2003: 8). Chronicles do not say when Tho Kyaung Bwa ceased being sawbwa, or who succeeded him.) (One source claims that he was a son of Tho Kyaung Bwa. (Note: (Fernquest Autumn 2006: 58) says that Hsan Hpa was a son of the previous ruler of Onbaung who married an Ava princess named Sanda in 1393. It suggests the information came from "both the Burmese and Hsipaw-Onpaung chronicles" although paragraph includes a citation only to a 2006 Wikipedia article on Queen Shin Saw Bu. The year 1393 and the name of the Ava royal (Sanda) presumably come from the Hsipaw-Onpaung chronicle as they are not found in the standard Burmese chronicles. Chronicles (Hmannan Vol. 1 2003: 446) give 766 ME (1404/05) not 1393 as to when Tho Kyaung Bwa submitted to Ava, and do not mention the name of the princess (a niece of King Minkhaung I).)) While Tho Kyaung Bwa was married to a niece of King Minkhaung I of Ava, and Le Than Bwa was offered the throne of Ava by Queen Shin Bo-Me, the chronicles do not explicitly say that Le Than Bwa was of Ava royal descent. (Note: On the other hand, chronicles (Maha Yazawin Vol. 2 2006: 59), (Yazawin Thit Vol. 1 2012: 269), (Hmannan Vol. 2 2003: 58) do not say that Le Than Bwa did not have a claim to the throne either when Queen Bo-Me offered the throne to him. Even if he were a grandnephew of Minkhaung, his claim would have been superseded by those of many other senior princes.)

== Ava's succession crisis (1425–1426) ==
At any rate, Le Than Bwa was in charge of Onbaung in 1425. His principality marked the limit of Ava's sphere of influence as it was located next to Hsenwi, on the Chinese side. Though he ruled a peripheral state, Le Than Bwa would prove to be a central player in a scheme that plunged Ava into a deep political turmoil for the next two decades.

=== Assassination of Thihathu (1425) ===
Le Than Bwa became involved the palace intrigues in 1425 when he was recruited by Queen Shin Bo-Me to assassinate King Thihathu. Chronicles say that although Bo-Me planned to place her lover Prince Min Nyo of Kale on the throne, she initially tried to win over Le Than Bwa by dangling the possibility of his taking over the throne. Although Le Than Bwa realized that the court would probably not agree to his kingship given senior princes like Prince Nyo waiting in the wing, he nonetheless agreed to execute Bo-Me's scheme. In August 1425, Le Than Bwa and his men ambushed and killed Thihathu at Aung Pinle (modern Amarapura, Mandalay), the location Bo-Me provided. The assassination paved the way for Nyo's accession three months later in November. At his accession, a grateful Nyo rewarded Le Than Bwa with lavish gifts.

=== War between Nyo and Thado (1426) ===
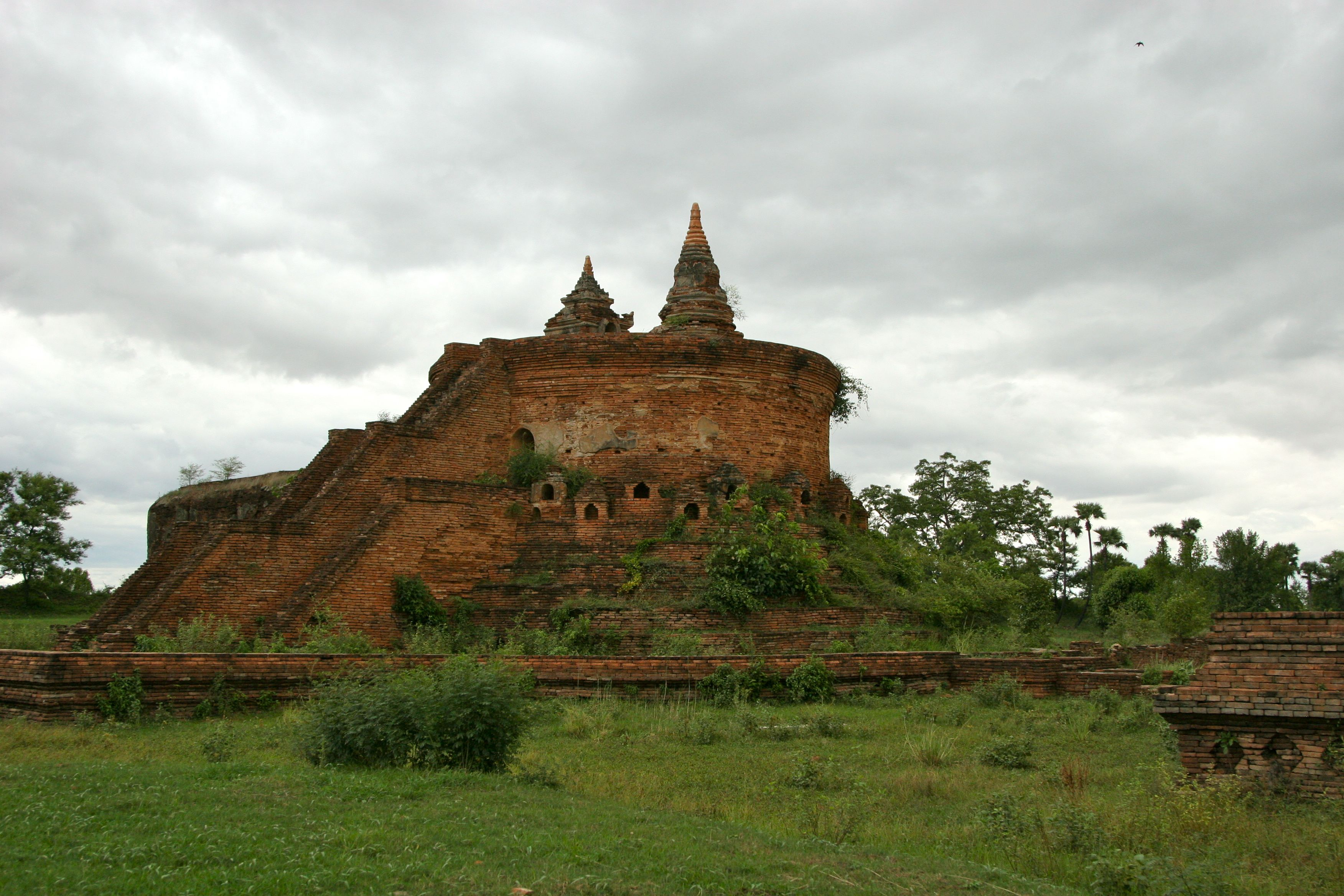
Stupa ruins in Ava (Inwa) today

Le Than Bwa was a senior commander of Ava forces in the subsequent war between Nyo and Gov. Thado of Mohnyin. At the start of the war in February 1426, Le Than Bwa and Gov. Thray Sithu of Myinsaing commanded Ava's defenses, on the eastern and western banks of the Irrawaddy, respectively. When Thado's forces broke through Thray Sithu's defenses, Le Than Bwa took over the overall command of the army at Sagaing, across the river from Ava. But he did not fight. He evacuated Sagaing when Thado gave him a substantial amount of gold and silver to leave the scene. (Note: (Maha Yazawin Vol. 2 2006: 60) does not specify the amount. (Yazawin Thit Vol. 1 2012: 271) says the amount of 10 viss (16.93 kg) of gold, and 50 silver cups. (Hmannan Vol. 2 2003: 59) says 3 viss (4.9 kg) of gold and 50 silver cups.) Ava defenses collapsed afterwards. Other vassal rulers who manned the positions around Ava—the rulers of Toungoo, Taungdwin and Pakhan—too renounced their ties to Nyo, and withdrew to their respective regions. King Nyo and Queen Bo-Me fled the capital. Thado entered the capital on 16 May 1426, and proclaimed himself king. (Note: (Yazawin Thit Vol. 1 2012: 272): Thursday, the 10th waxing of Nayon 788 ME = 16 May 1426)

== Independent rule (1426–1444) ==
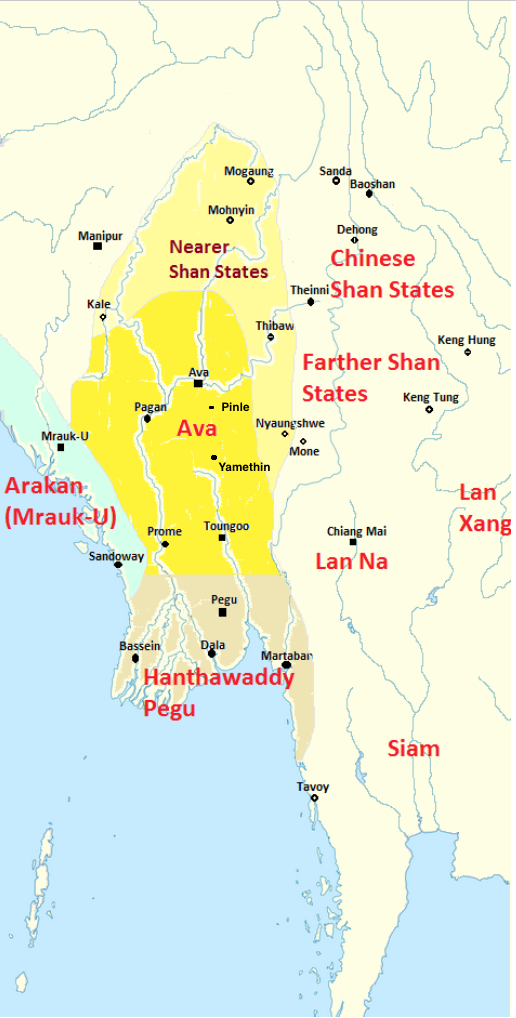
Le Than Bwa of Onbaung (Hsipaw/Thibaw) backed Minye Kyawhtin's rebellion based out of Pinle from 1426 to 1444.

Although he took Thado's bribe, Le Than Bwa, like many other vassal rulers, refused to submit to the new king. The sawbwa would keep the pressure on Ava by supporting an active rebellion in the core region of Ava to 1444.

=== Gaining Ava's recognition (1429) ===
Initially, Le Than Bwa tried to be the kingmaker of Ava. He tried to overthrow Thado by actively backing the rebellion of Prince Minye Kyawhtin, who had a strong claim to the throne. It was mainly his troops that powered Kyawhtin's expeditions to conquer Ava in 1426–1427 and in 1427–1428. The 1427–1428 expedition gained control of Pinle, a well defended town with high brick walls at the edge of the Ava capital region.

The control of Pinle led to Ava's recognition of Onbaung's independence a year later. After Ava forces failed to take Pinle in 1428–1429, Thado sent a mission to Onbaung. The king urged Le Than Bwa to withdraw his support of Minye Kyawhtin in exchange for forming an "alliance", essentially recognizing Onbaung's independence. (Thado also sent a similar mission to Yat Sauk Naung Mun, immediately south of Onbaung, to persuade its sawbwa to withdraw his support of Taungdwin and Yemethin rebellions.) But Le Than Bwa like his counterpart in Yat Sauk refused the offer.

His refusal did not result in any repercussions. Ava was so preoccupied with several rebellions around the core region that it could do nothing about the peripheral states like Onbaung. Indeed, after multiple failed expeditions around the core region in 1430–1434, Thado ceased all military operations for the rest of his reign (to 1439).

=== Return to Ava's fold (1444) ===
Le Than Bwa chose to submit to Ava in 1444. What pushed him over the line was the Chinese military expeditions (into present-day Myanmar) that threatened Onbaung. To be sure, even before the Chinese incursions, his client Kyawhtin was barely holding on to Pinle. By 1443, Thado's successors kings Minye Kyawswa I and Narapati I had defeated long running rebellions in the north and in the south, leaving Pinle as the only holdout. Indeed, Pinle survived Ava's siege in 1443 only because of the Chinese invasions. In 1444, he sent an embassy to the Ava garrison at Kaungton to offer his allegiance to Ava. In 1445, he personally went to Sagaing to attend the opening ceremony of the Htupayon Pagoda that King Narapati had just built. (Minye Kyawhtin did not follow suit. The prince was driven out Pinle and Yamethin later in 1445.)

== Death and aftermath ==
The sawbwa died in 1459/60. (Note: (Maha Yazawin Vol. 2 2006: 84) says he died in 820 ME (1458/59) but (Yazawin Thit Vol. 1 2012: 293) corrects it to 821 ME (1459/60). (Hmmanan Vol. 2 2003: 94–95) keeps Yazawin Thit's correction. Also note that all three chronicles say Kaung Le Bwa the sawbwa of Onbaung. But Kaung Le Bwa was the sawbwa of Kale (Kalay) in the sentence immediately before the mention of the sawbwa of Onbaung's death. (Fernquest 2006: 60) says Hsan Hpa died in 1438, citing the Maha Yazawin chronicle. But 1438 is a typographical error as (Maha Yazawin Vol. 2 2006: 84) gives 820 ME (1458/59), which was later corrected by later chronicles to 821 ME (1459/60).) His son Kham Yut Bwa succeeded but the son shortly after was driven out by one of the vassal lords supported by the Shan state of Yat Sauk. Ava had to send a sizable army (8000 troops, 600 cavalry, 40 elephants) to Yat Sauk. The army was initially driven back by the combined forces of Yat Sauk, Naung-Mun, Mong Nai, and Nyaungshwe (southern Shan states) but eventually prevailed, and restored Kham Yut Bwa to the Onbaung throne.

== Bibliography ==
- Aung-Thwin, Michael A. (2017). Myanmar in the Fifteenth Century. Honolulu: University of Hawai'i Press. ISBN 978-0-8248-6783-6.
- Fernquest, Jon (Autumn 2005). "Min-gyi-nyo, the Shan Invasions of Ava (1524–27), and the Beginnings of Expansionary Warfare in Toungoo Burma: 1486–1539" (PDF). SOAS Bulletin of Burma Research. 3 (2). Archived from the original (PDF) on 3 March 2016.
- Fernquest, Jon (Autumn 2006). "Crucible of War: Burma and the Ming in the Tai Frontier Zone (1382–1454)" (PDF). SOAS Bulletin of Burma Research. 4 (2). Archived from the original (PDF) on 15 April 2019.
- Harvey, G. E. (1925). History of Burma: From the Earliest Times to 10 March 1824. London: Frank Cass & Co. Ltd.
- Kala, U (2006) [1724]. Maha Yazawin (in Burmese). Vol. 1–3 (4th printing ed.). Yangon: Ya-Pyei Publishing.
- Maha Sithu (2012) [1798]. Myint Swe; Kyaw Win; Thein Hlaing (eds.). Yazawin Thit (in Burmese). Vol. 1–3 (2nd printing ed.). Yangon: Ya-Pyei Publishing.
- Royal Historical Commission of Burma (2003) [1832]. Hmannan Yazawin (in Burmese). Vol. 1–3. Yangon: Ministry of Information, Myanmar.

Le Than Bwa Ava Kingdom Born: 1400s? Died: 1459/60
Royal titles
Preceded by Tho Kyaung Bwa?	Sawbwa of Onbaung by 1425 – 1459/60	Succeeded by Kham Yut Bwa
