= Lavant Viaduct =

Coordinates: 46°55′16″N 14°50′22″E

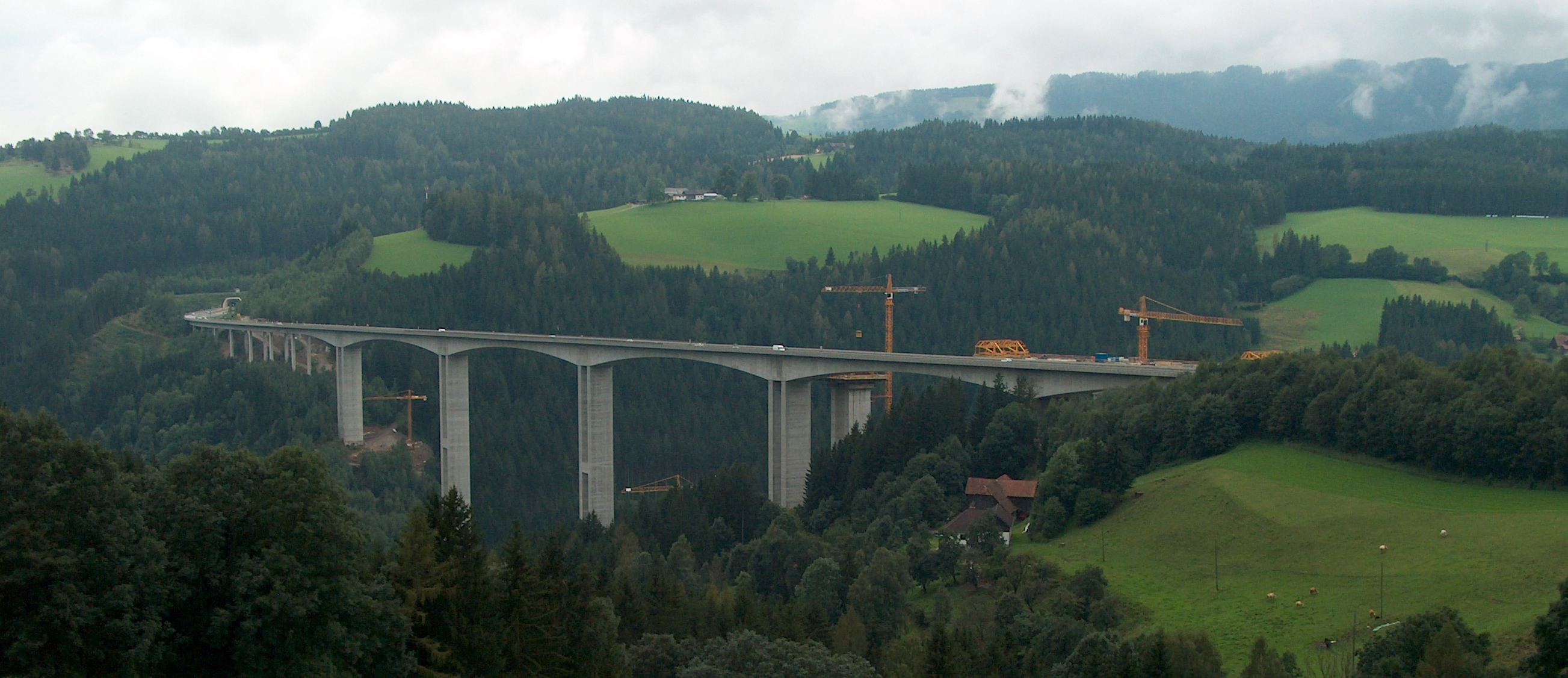
Lavant Viaduct above the Lavant Valley. In the background, the second bridge is still under construction

The Lavant Viaduct (German: Talübergang Lavant) is a motorway bridge crossing the Lavant River on the A2 motorway in Carinthia, Austria. With a length of 1,097 m and height of 165 m, it is also the second-highest bridge in Austria.

The first (left) bridge was opened on 26 July 1986. Due to cost-cutting reasons, the second (right) bridge was not built, and the section from Bad Sankt Leonhard im Lavanttal to Wolfsberg was open only on the left side. Construction of the right side of the bridge started in 2004 and was finished in 2007.
