= Burgruine Twimberg =

Castle ruin in Austria

Coordinates: 46.914°N 14.843°E

- Carinthia, Austria
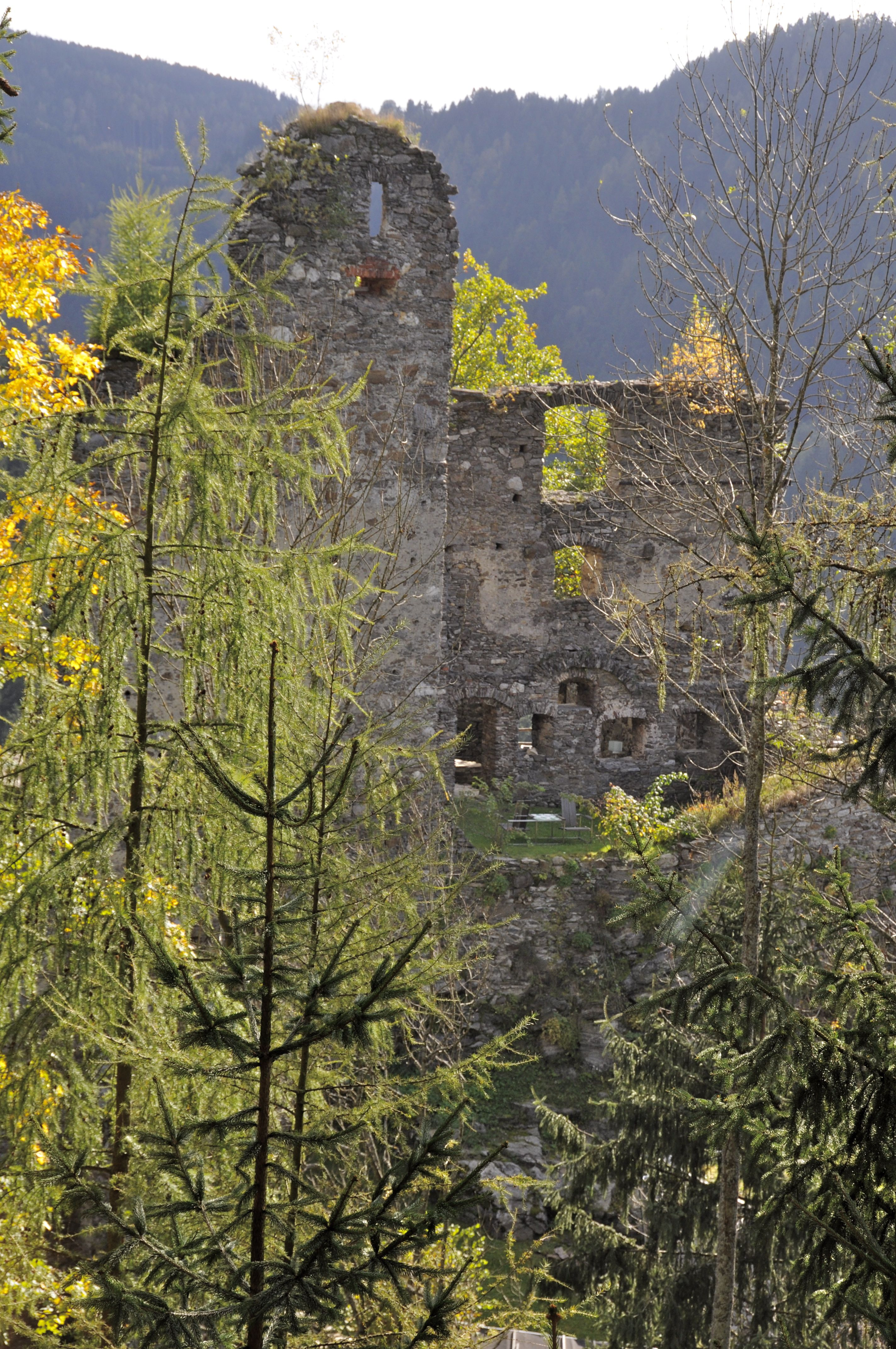

Site information
- Type: Hilltop castle

Site history
- Built: around 931

Burgruine Twimberg is a castle in Carinthia, Austria.

== See also ==
- List of castles in Austria
