= Sao Kya Seng =

Myanmar politician, engineer, and agriculturalist

- စဝ်ကြာဆိုင် ၸဝ်ႈၵျႃႇသႅင်
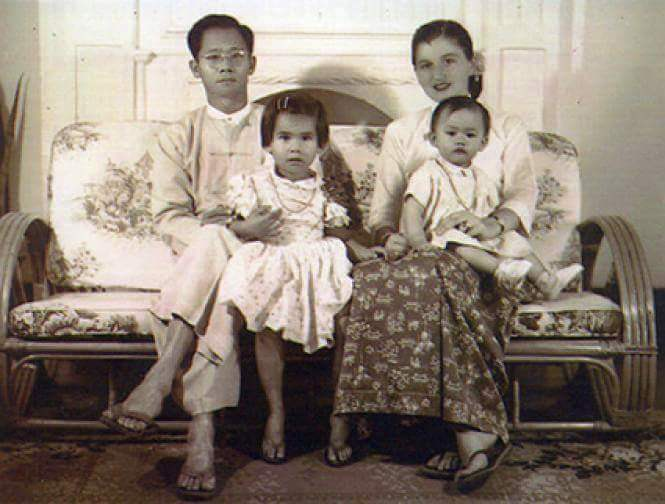
- Sao Kya Seng and his family
- Born: 1924; Hsipaw, Federated Shan States, British Burma
- Disappeared: 3 March 1962 (aged 37–38) near Taunggyi, Burma
- Spouse: Inge Eberhard
- Children: Sao Kennari; Sao Mayari
- Relatives: Tin Shwe, Nang Kham Hlaing, Sao Hlyan Seng (siblings)

Saopha of Hsipaw State
- In office 1947–1959
- Prime Minister: U Nu; Ba Swe; Ne Win
- Minister of Shan State: Sao Hkun Hkio
- Preceded by: Sao Ohn Kya
- Succeeded by: position abolished

Member of Chamber of Nationalities
- In office 1954–1962
- Prime Minister: U Nu; Ba Swe; Ne Win
- Preceded by: position established
- Succeeded by: position abolished
- Constituency: Hsipaw

Personal details
- Party: AFPFL; Union Party
- Education: Colorado School of Mines
- Profession: Mining engineer; Agriculturalist; Politician

Sao Kya Seng or Sao Kya Hseng (Burmese: စဝ်ကြာဆိုင်; Shan: ၸဝ်ႈၵျႃႇသႅင်; 1924 – disappeared 3 March 1962) was a politician, a mining engineer, an agriculturalist and the last Saopha of Hsipaw State, Myanmar, from 1947 to 1959.

== Early life ==
He studied mining engineering at the Colorado School of Mines in Golden, Colorado, United States, from 1949 to 1953. He graduated with a BSc degree in 1953 and then married. His spouse, Sao Nang Thu Sandi or Inge Eberhard, a German-speaking Austrian student who had received a Fulbright Scholarship in 1951, was studying at Colorado Women's College, a constituent college of University of Denver. In 1954, he returned to Burma with her. Inge believed her husband was a mining engineer, but upon arriving in Rangoon, Burma, she was surprised to find a large, cheering crowd welcoming them. It was at that moment Sao Kya Seng disclosed that he was the prince of Hsipaw.

== As ruler ==
After arrival, they were crowned as saopha and mahadevi although Sao Kya Seng had already held this title since 1947. Upon his return in 1953, Sao Kya Seng established the Tai Mining Company with the goal of harnessing his state's abundant mineral resources, including lead, silver, salt, antimony, zinc, and gold. After nine years as rulers of Hsipaw, the couple had two daughters, Sao Mayari and Sao Kennari. Implementing innovative changes to the traditional feudal system of his state, Sao Kya Seng generously granted all princely family paddy fields to the cultivating farmers. He provided free access to tractors and agricultural tools, establishing a progressive approach at his agricultural research center by introducing new crops. Leveraging his background in mining engineering, he launched mineral explorations in Hsipaw, utilizing the proceeds to fund numerous development initiatives. The elderly residents of Hsipaw fondly reminisce about the bygone era of their young princely couple, a time when their quality of life exceeded what they experience today, marked by decades of mismanagement under successive military-dominated regimes.

== Abdication and political career ==
Sao Kya Seng abdicated when Shan rulers relinquished their powers in 1959, marking Burma's transition to a republic. Despite this, many of them continued their political involvement, with most becoming members of the House of Nationalities, the upper house of the bicameral parliament. He served as a member of the Chamber of Nationalities, representing Hsipaw constituency, Shan State from 1954 to 1962. From 1948 to 1962, he served as a member of the Shan State Council and as secretary for the Association of Shan Princes from 1954 to 1962. He was arrested in 1962 after General Ne Win's 1962 Burmese coup d'état. Sao Kya Seng was last seen being taken into custody at an army checkpoint near Taunggyi. It was later revealed that he was killed during his detention that year by the military government, who never admitted responsibility. His wife persistently wrote letters to the Burmese civilian president, Thein Sein, seeking information about Sao Kya Seng. Unfortunately, these letters were consistently ignored.

On October 1, 2015, Sao Kya Seng's alma mater Colorado School of Mines acknowledged his contributions, posthumously awarding him the Distinguished Achievement Medal for his remarkable professional accomplishments. The medal was accepted on his behalf by his wife.

Sao Kya Seng was considered by the Shan people as one of the Shan national leaders who promoted federalism and democracy, together with Sao Shwe Thaik and Sao Hkun Hkio. His nephew, Khun Htun Oo, son of his elder brother Sao Kyar Zon, served as president of Shan National League for Democracy, a major political party representing Shan people.

== In popular culture ==
Sao Kya Seng's wife, Inge, wrote a book, Twilight Over Burma: My Life as a Shan Princess, in 1994 about her marriage and life in Burma. The book became the film, Twilight Over Burma, in 2015. The film was banned in both Myanmar and Thailand.
