= Hsipaw Yazawin =

19th-century Burmese chronicle

Thibaw Yazawin
- Original title: သီပေါ ရာဇဝင်
- Language: Shan
- Series: Shan chronicles
- Genre: Chronicle, History
- Publication date: 19th century
- Publication place: Hsipaw, Kingdom of Burma

Hsipaw Yazawin or Thibaw Yazawin (Burmese: သီပေါ ရာဇဝင်, lit. 'Chronicle of Hsipaw') is a 19th-century Burmese chronicle that covers the history of the Shan state of Hsipaw (Thibaw). It is believed to have been written after the publication of Hmannan Yazawin.

== Bibliography ==
- Cochrane, W.W. (1915). The Shans. Vol. 1. Yangon: Superintendent, Government Printing.
