= Burgruine Gomarn =

Castle ruins in Austria

Coordinates: 46.9636°N 14.7878°E

- Carinthia, Austria
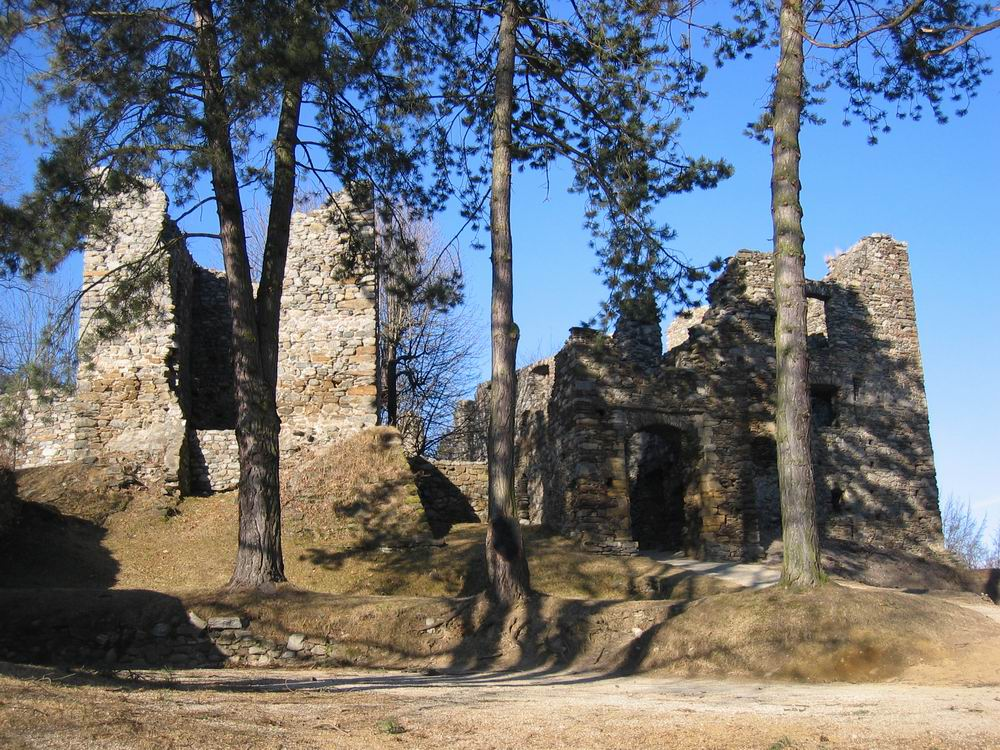
- Gomarn castle ruins

Site information
- Type: Castle

Burgruine Gomarn is a castle in Carinthia, Austria.

== See also ==
- List of castles in Austria
