= Hsipaw State =

Former Shan state in Burma

Coordinates: 27°37′N 97°17′E

Hsipaw သီပေါမြို့ သီႇပေႃႉ
- Möng of the Shan States
- c. 13th century–1959
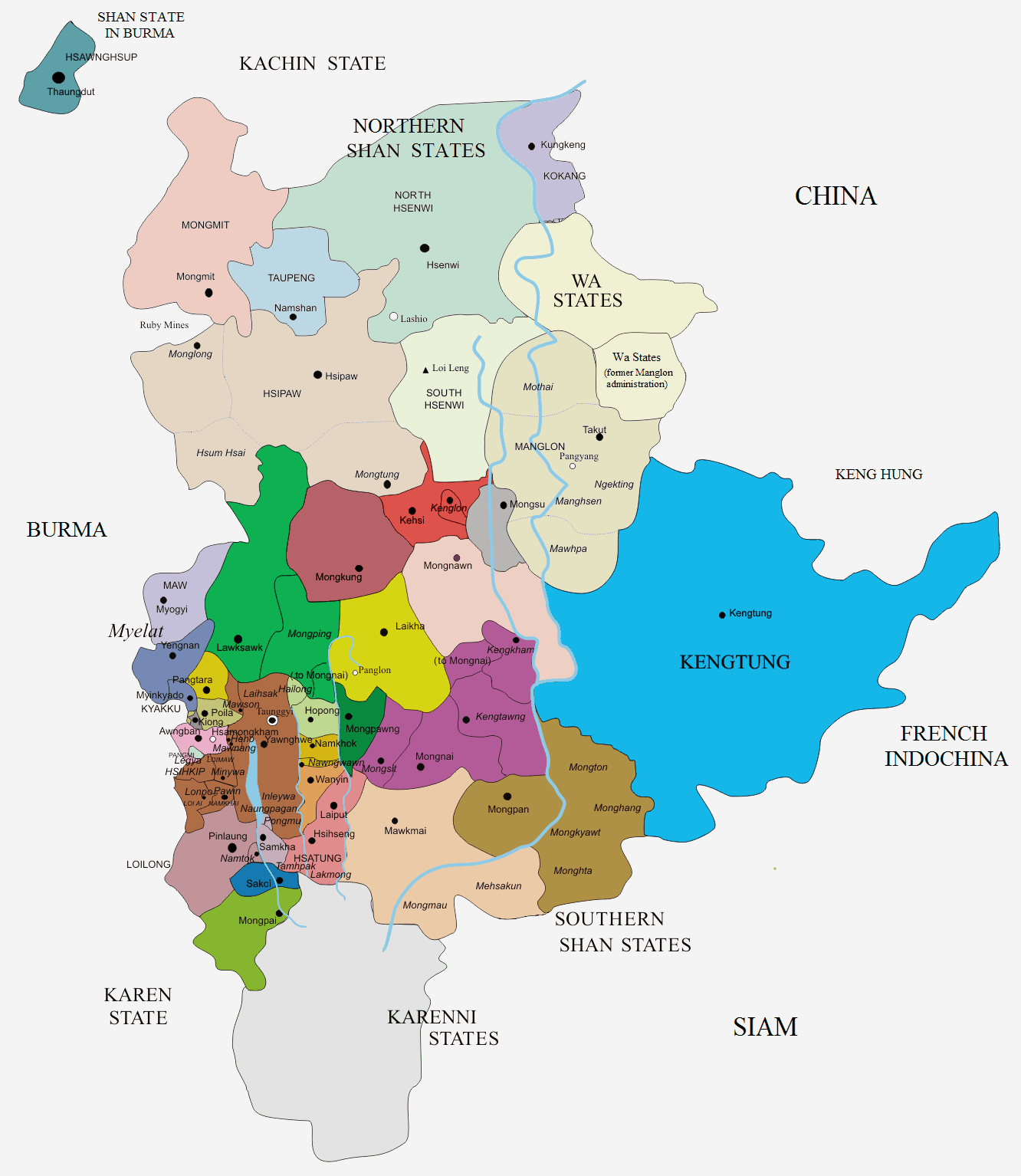
- Hsipaw State (beige, near the upper left) in a map of the Shan States
- Capital: Hsipaw
- Area
  - 1891 Census of India: 8,188 km^{2} (3,161 sq mi)
- Population
  - 1891 Census of India: 200,000
- History
  - Established: c. 13th century
  - Bayinnaung's sovereignty acknowledged: 16th century
  - Abdication of the last Saopha: 1959
Preceded by	Succeeded by
Ava Kingdom	Shan State
- Today part of: Myanmar

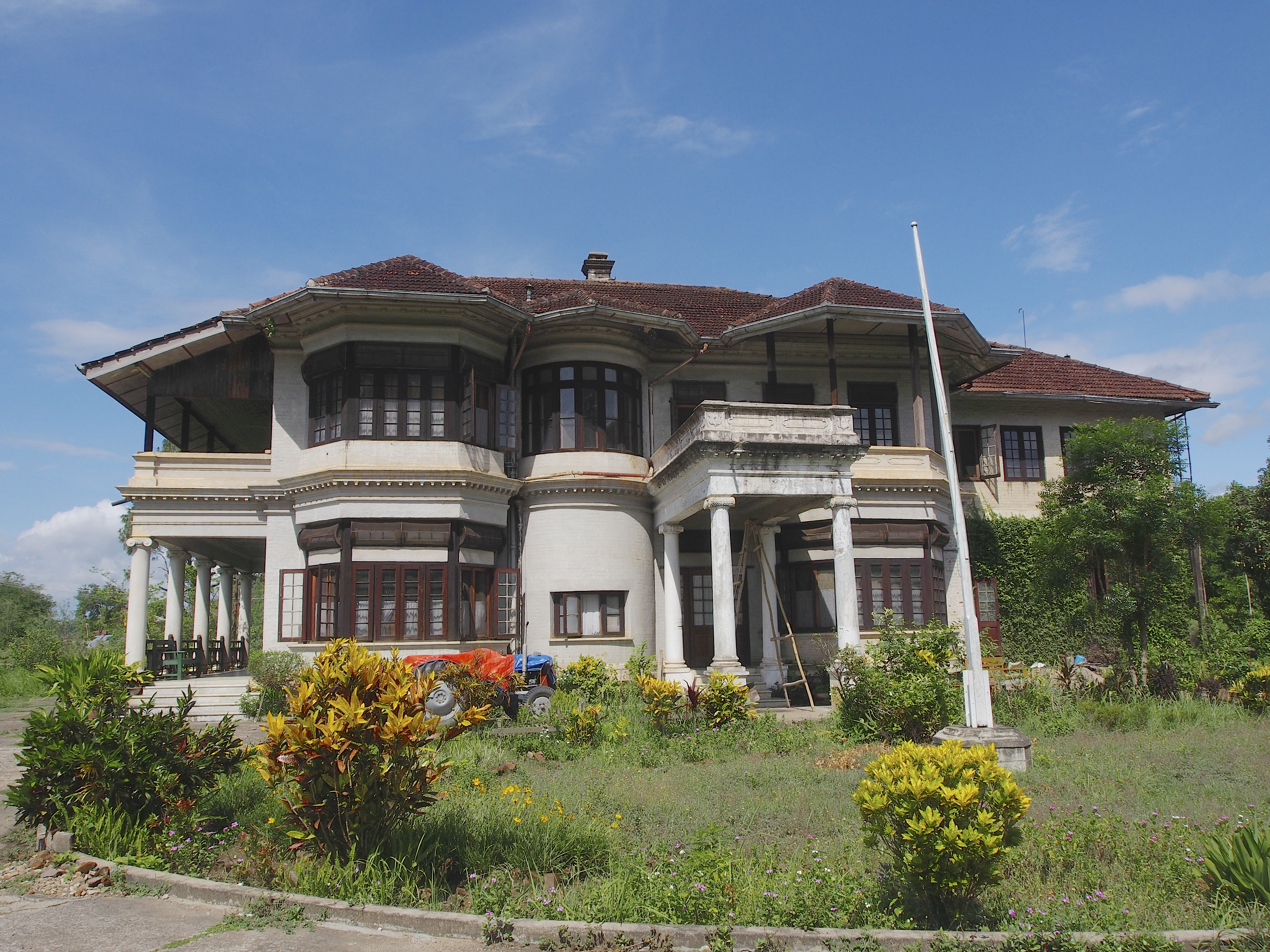
Hsipaw Palace was built in 1924.

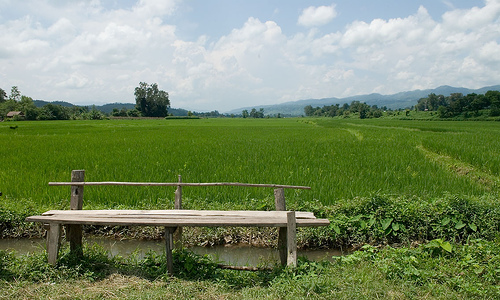
Hsipaw countryside, autumn 2006

Hsipaw, (Note: Shan: သီႇပေႃႉ; Burmese: သီပေါနယ်) also spelled Thibaw, was a Shan state located in what is now Myanmar (Burma). It was also referred to as Ong Pawng (Note: Shan: ဢုင်းပွင်ႇ; Burmese: အုန်းဘောင်) or Onbaung after the name of an old capital. The state was centered around the modern town of Hsipaw.

== History ==
A predecessor state named Duṭṭhavatī (Burmese: ဒုဋ္ဌဝတီ) was said to be founded in 58 BC, according to local tradition.

A Burmese inscription contemporary to Thihathu (c. 1265–1324) recorded that he repulsed an attack coming from Onbaung (Hsipaw). Another conflict broke out between Hsipaw and the Ava kingdom in 1415.

During the Sino-Burmese War (1765–69) the Qianlong Emperor of China invaded the area of Hsipaw. The main Chinese army, led by Ming Rui, was to approach Ava through Hsenwi, Lashio and Hsipaw down the Namtu river. The main invasion route was the same route followed by the Manchu forces a century earlier, chasing the Yongli Emperor of the Southern Ming dynasty. The second army, led by Gen. E'erdeng'e, was to try the Bhamo route again. The ultimate objective was for both armies to clamp themselves in a pincer action on the Burmese capital of Ava. The Burmese plan was to hold the second Chinese army in the north at Kaungton with the army led by Ne Myo Sithu, and meet the main Chinese army in the northeast with two armies led by Maha Sithu and Maha Thiha Thura.

At first, everything went according to plan for the Qing. The third invasion began in November 1767 as the smaller Chinese army attacked and occupied Bhamo. Within eight days, Ming Rui's main army occupied the Shan states of Hsenwi and Hsipaw. Ming Rui made Hsenwi a supply base, and assigned 5000 troops to remain at Hsenwi and guard the rear. He then led a 15,000-strong army in the direction of Ava. In late December, at the Goteik Gorge (south of Hsipaw), the two main armies faced off and the first major battle of the third invasion ensued. Outnumbered two-to-one, Maha Sithu's main Burmese army was thoroughly routed by Ming Rui's Bannermen. Maha Thiha Thura too was repulsed at Hsenwi. The news of the disaster at Goteik reached Ava. Hsinbyushin finally realized the gravity of the situation, and urgently recalled Burmese armies from Siam.

Having smashed through the main Burmese army, Ming Rui pressed on full steam ahead, overrunning one town after another, and reached Singu on the Irrawaddy, 30 miles north of Ava at the beginning of 1768. The only bright spot for the Burmese was that the northern invasion force, which was to come down the Irrawaddy to join up with Ming Rui's main army, had been held off at Kaungton.

In 1886 the saopha of Hsipaw was the first Shan prince that submitted to British rule in Burma, which led to Hsipaw becoming a British protectorate in 1887. According to the biography of Sao Nang Hearn Hkam (the chief wife, Madhidevi of Sao Shwe Thaik, the first president of Myanmar and another saopha of Hsenwi), Hsipaw, along with Kengtung and Yawnghwe were the wealthiest and most powerful saopha states in Shan State.

Between 1938 and 1947 Hsipaw was administered by British Burma. The last ruler of the On Baung dynasty that had been ruling Hsipaw abdicated in 1959. The state became part of Shan State and, despite the independence struggle of the latter, eventually part of Burma.

The saophas played fluctuating roles in regional Shan and national Burmese politics from the 11th century all the way until the 1962 military coup by General Ne Win when all the privileges of the saophas were abolished.

== Rulers ==
The Princes of Hsipaw had the title of 'Saopha'. The following lists all rulers of Hsipaw State, along with their relationship to the prior ruler(s). From the mid-1880s to 1922, the territory was a British protectorate as part of the Shan States (within British Burma in the wider British India), and from 1922 to 1948 as part of the Federated Shan States. As a British possession, the ruler of Hsipaw State was entitled to a nine-gun salute.

#	Rulers	Enthrone	Dethrone	Detail
1	Sao Hkun Hkam Naw	58BC	23BC	
2	Sao Hkun Hkam Kaw	23BC	10AD	Son of Sao Hkun Hkam Naw
3	Sao Hkam Kawt	10	36	Son of Sao Hkun Hkam Kaw
4	Sao Hkam Htawt	36	72	Brother of Sao Hkam Kawt
5	Sao Hkam Möng	72	110	Son of Sao Hkam Htawt
6	Sao Hkam Ung	110	127	Brother of Sao Hkam Möng
7	Sao Hkam Sung	127	171	Brother of Sao Hkam Ung
8	Sao Hkam Kio	171	207	Son of Sao Hkam Sung
9	Paw Ai Phyao	207	237	Former senior officer (Amat)
10	Paw Pan Süng	237	237	Son of Paw Ai Phyao
11	Hso Hom Hpa	237	257	Son of Sao Sam Mya of Mao Löng (Möng Mao), great grandson of Sao Hkam Möng
12	Hso Waep Hpa	257	309	Son of Hso Hom Hpa
13	Hso Het Hpa	309	347	Son of Hso Waep Hpa
14	Hso Gam Hpa	347	380	Uncle of Hso Het Hpa
15	Hso Karm Hpa	380	420	Son of Hso Gam Hpa
16	Hso Pat Hpa	420	465	Brother of Hso Karm Hpa
17	Hso Hap Hpa	465	501	Brother of Hso Pat Hpa
18	Hso Pik Hpa	501	517	Son of Hso Hap Hpa
19	Hso Powt Hpa	517	552	Brother of Hso Pik Hpa
20	Hso Klip Hpa	552	574	Nephew of Hso Powt Hpa
21	Hso Peng Hpa	574	608	Brother of Hso Klip Hpa
22	Hso Kern Hpa	608	640	Son of Hso Peng Hpa
23	Hso Poeng Hpa	640	687	Brother of Hso Kern Hpa
24	Hso Pek Hpa	687	711	Brother of Hso Poeng Hpa
25	Hso Poum Hpa	711	739	Brother of Hso Pek Hpa
26	Hso Soup Hpa	739	761	Son of Hso Poum Hpa
27	Hso Hung Hpa	761	797	Son of Hso Soup Hpa
28	Hso Oum Hpa	797	815	Son of Hso Hung Hpa
29	Hso Hat Hpa	815	860	Son of Hso Oum Hpa
30	Hso Kat Hpa	860	897	Son of Hso Hat Hpa
31	Hso Tam Hpa	897	912	Son of Hso Kat Hpa
32	Hso Tap Hpa	912	947	Brother of Hso Tam Hpa
33	Hso Hkan Hpa	947	954	Son of Hso Tap Hpa
34	Hso Pung Hpa	954	994	Brother of Hso Hkan Hpa
35	Hso Mawk Hpa	994	1022	Son of Hso Pung Hpa
36	Hso Soum Hpa	1022	1028	Son of Hso Mawk Hpa
37	Hso Sam Hpa	1028	1064	Son of Hso Soum Hpa
38	Hso Hit Hpa	1064	1086	Nephew of Hso Sam Hpa
39	Hso Hueng Hpa	1086	1119	Son of Hso Hit Hpa
40	Hso Hsu Hpa	1119	1137	Son of Hso Hueng Hpa
41	Hso Hsawng Hpa	1137	1205	Son of Hso Hsu Hpa
42	Sao Hkun Hso	1160	1205	Son of Hso Hsawng Hpa
43	Sawn Mawng Hawna	1205	1228	Brother of Sao Hkun Hso
44	Hso Hkayeik Hpa	1228	1276	Son of Sawn Mawng Hawna
45	Sao Hkun Pe	1276	1324	Cousin of Hso Hkayeik Hpa
46	Hkun Kyaw Awng	1324	1367	Brother of Sao Hkun Pe
47	Hkun Kyaw Nwe	1367	1401	Son of Hkun Kyaw Awng
48	Hso Kyaung Hpa	1401	1423	Son of Hkun Kyaw Nwe
49	Sao Loi San Hpa	1423	1438	Nephew of Hso Kyaung Hpa
50	Hso Yap Hpa	1438	1448	Cousin of Sao Loi San Hpa
51	Hso Ham Hpa	1448	1454	Son of Hso Yap Hpa
52	Hso Moew Hpa	1454	1461	Brother of Hso Ham Hpa
53	Hso Wip Hpa	1461	1471	Brother of Hso Moew Hpa
54	Hso Piam Hpa	1471	1479	Son of Hso Wip Hpa
55	Hso Haw Hpa	1479	1487	Brother of Hso Piam Hpa
56	Hso Sam Hpa	1487	1519	Brother of Hso Haw Hpa
57	Sao Hkun Mawng	1519	1542	Son of Hso Sam Hpa, later was elected as the King of Ava
58	Hso Hom Hpa	1542	1549	Brother of Sao Hkun Mawng
59	Hso Paw Hpa	1549	1557	Son of Hso Pak Hpa of Mong Nai, grandson of Sao Hkun Mawng
60	Hso Yuew Hpa	1557	1557	Son of Hso Hom Hpa
61	Hso Pak Hpa of Mong Nai	1557	1557	Son of Sao Hkun Mawng
62	Hso Dwawt Hpa	1557	1565	Son of Hso Yuew Hpa
63	Hso Hkai Hpa	1565	1584	Son of Hso Dwawt Hpa
64	Hso Kaw Hpa	1584	1597	Son of Sao Hkun Mawng, brother of Hso Pak Hpa of Mong Nai
65	Sao Hkam Leng	1597	1636	Son of Hso Kaw Hpa
66	Sao Hswe Hking	1636	1655	Son of Sao Hkam Leng
67	Hso Woew Hpa	1655	1675	Son of Sao Hswe Hking
68	Hso Wei Hpa	1675	1702	Son of Hso Woew Hpa
69	Sao Okka Wara	1702	1714	Brother of Hso Wei Hpa
70	Sao Okka Zeya	1714	1718	Brother of Sao Okka Wara
71	Sao Sam Myo	1718	1722	Brother of Sao Okka Zeya
72	Sao Hkun Neng	1722	1752	Brother of Sao Sam Myo
73	Sao Sawra Yawta	1752	1767	Son of Sao Okka Wara
74	Sao Myat Hsan Te	1767	1788	Son of Sao Sawra Yawta
75	Sao Hswe Kya	1788	1809	Son of Sao Myat Hsan Te
76	Hkun Hkwi	1809	1843	Son of Sao Hswe Kya
77	Hkun Paw	1843	1853	Brother of Hkun Hkwi
78	Sao Kya Htun	1853	1858	Son of Sao Hswe Kya
79	Hkun Myat Than	1858	1866	Brother of Sao Kya Htun
80	Sao Kya Hkeng (Sao Hkun Hseng) – 1st reign	1866	1882	Son of Sao Kya Htun, deposed by King Mindon Min of Burma in 1882
81	Sao Hlaing Pa	1882	1886	Son of King Mindon Min of Burma
80	Sao Kya Hkeng (Sao Hkun Hseng) – 2nd reign	1886	1902	Son of Sao Kya Htun, reappointed by King Mindon Min of Burma in March 1886, died 8 May 1902
82	Sao Hkun Hke	1902	1928	Son of Sao Kya Hkeng, born 1872, reigned 8 May 1902, died May 1928
83	Sao Ohn Kya	1928	1938	Son of Sao Hkun Hke, born 1893, died July 1938
—	—	1938	1947	Under direct administration of British India
84	Sao Kya Hseng	1947	1959	The Last saopha of Hsipaw, son of Sao Ohn Kya, born 1924, (some records indicate that he is the son of Sao O, who is the son of Sao Kya Hkeng), disappeared 3 March 1962

== See also ==
- Hsipaw Yazawin
- Sino-Burmese War (1765–1769)

== Bibliography ==
- Fernquest, Jon (Autumn 2006). "Crucible of War: Burma and the Ming in the Tai Frontier Zone (1382–1454)". SOAS Bulletin of Burma Research. 4 (2).
- Hall, D.G.E. (1960). Burma (3rd ed.). Hutchinson University Library. ISBN 978-1-4067-3503-1.
- Haskew, Michael E.; Joregensen, Christer; Niderost, Eric; McNab, Chris (2008). Fighting techniques of the Oriental world, AD 1200–1860: equipment, combat skills, and tactics (Illustrated ed.). Macmillan. ISBN 978-0-312-38696-2.
- Htin Aung, Maung (1967). A History of Burma. New York and London: Cambridge University Press.
- Harvey, G. E. (1925). History of Burma: From the Earliest Times to 10 March 1824. London: Frank Cass & Co. Ltd.
- Kirigaya, Ken (2015). "The Early Syām and Rise of Mäng Mao: Western Mainland Southeast Asia in the "Tai Century"". The Journal of the Siam Society. 103: 235–268. ISSN 2651-1851.
- Kyaw Thet (1962). History of Union of Burma (in Burmese). Yangon: Yangon University Press.
- Sir Arthur Purves Phayre (1884). History of Burma: including Burma proper, Pegu, Taungu, Tenasserim, and Arakan. From the earliest time to the end of the first war with British India. Trübner & co.
- J. G. Scott (1900–1901). Gazetteer of Upper Burma and the Shan States. Rangoon: superintendent, Government printing. 5 vols.
