= Hsipaw =

Hsipaw သီပေါမြို့ ဝဵင်းသီႇပေႃႉ
- Town
- Hsipaw
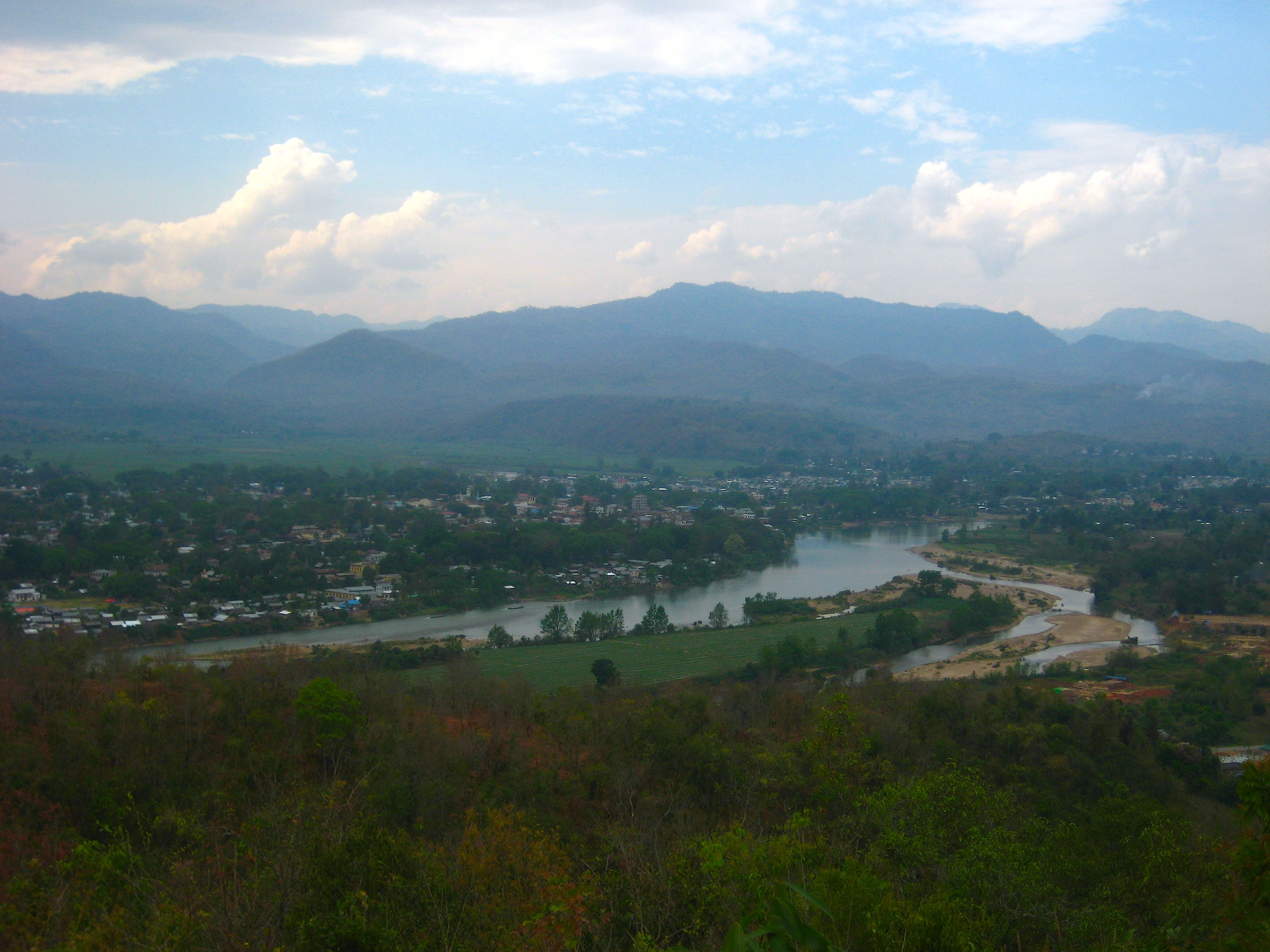
- Hsipaw

- Location in Myanmar
- Coordinates: 22°37′N 97°17′E
- Country: Myanmar
- State: Shan State
- District: Kyaukme District
- Township: Hsipaw Township

Population (2005)
  - Ethnicities: List of ethnicities: Shan; Bamar; Chinese
  - Religions: List of religions: Buddhism; Christianity; Islam; Hinduism; Others
- Time zone: UTC+6.30 (MST)

Hsipaw (Shan: သီႇပေႃႉ; Tai Nuea: ᥔᥤᥴ ᥙᥨᥝᥳ), also known as Thibaw (Burmese: သီပေါ), is the principal town of Hsipaw Township in Shan State, Myanmar on the banks of the Duthawadi River. It is 200 kilometres (120 mi) north-east of Mandalay. Hsipaw contains 11 wards, including South PanTein Ward, North PanTein Ward, Shwe Kyaung Ward, Taungmyo Ward, Oakkyin Ward, Western Ward, Downtown (Myolae) Ward, Myanmar Ward, Zay Ward, and Zatsuu Ward.

== History ==
The capital of Hsipaw was originally On Baung. From the 1450s, it was a faithful vasal of the Kingdom of Ava (1364-1527). After the fall of the latter before the Shans, a prince of On Baung, Sao Hkun Möng, was crowned King of Ava (1543-1546). A few decades later, King Bayinnaung, who reigned in Hanthawaddy kingdom, sent an army against On Baung, whose prince, like the other Shan princes, had to recognize his sovereignty to keep his throne (1557). The shans also had to cede part of their states, including Mogok, but the prince of On Baung obtained confirmation of his pre-eminence over the other shans princes.

The dynasty of On Baung was maintained, paying tribute to the successive Burmese dynasties: Toungoo dynasty (1535-1752) then Konbaung dynasty (1752-1885). In 1714, its capital was transferred to Hsipaw. Sao Kya Tung was his Saopha for the King of Burma Mindon Min, as a reward for his help against Pagan Min.

In February 2021, the Tatmadaw attacked the Restoration Council of Shan State’s camps in Hsipaw Township, breaking the Nationwide Ceasefire Agreement (NCA) according to the RCSS.

In May 2024, the Ta'ang National Liberation Army launched an offensive on the town during Operation 1027.

It has now been recaptured by the Tatmadaw on Oct 16th 2025.

== Shan Saopha ==
Hsipaw State was one of the most well known and powerful saopha Shan States. According to the biography of Sao Nang Hearn Hkam (the chief wife, Madhidevi of Sao Shwe Thaik, the first president of Myanmar and another saopha of Hsenwi), Hsipaw, along with Kengtung and Yawnghwe were the wealthiest and most powerful saopha states in Shan State.

The Saophas played fluctuating roles in regional Shan and national Burmese politics from the 11th century all the way until the 1962 military coup by General Ne Win.

Hsipaw is famous for the Bowgoy Pagoda, situated in Bowgoy Village about 6 miles (9.7 km) away from Hsipaw.

=== Saophas of Hsipaw ===
1) Sao Hkun Hkam Naw 58BC-23BC
2) Sao Hkun Hkam Kaw 23BC-10 son
3) Sao Hkam Kawt 10-36 son
4) Sao Hkam Htawt 36-72 bro
5) Sao Hkam Möng 72-110 son
6) Sao Hkam Ung 110-127 bro
7) Sao Hkam Sung 127-171 bro
8) Sao Hkam Kio 171-207 son
9) Paw Ai Phyao 207-237 Amat
10) Paw Pan Süng 237-237 son
11) Hso Hom Hpa 237-257 son of Sao Sam Mya of Mao Löng
12) Hso Wei Hpa 257-309 son
13) Hso Heb Hpa 309-347 son
14) name unknown 347-380 uncle
15) Hso Kern Hpa 380-420 son
16) Hso Pan Hpa 420-465 bro
17) Hso Hom Hpa 465-501 bro
18) Hso Pek Hpa 501-517 son
19) Hso Paw Hpa 517-552 bro
20) name unknown nephew 552-574
21) Hso Peng Hpa 574-608
22) Hso Kern Hpa 608-640 son
23) Hso Pan Hpa 640-687 bro
24) Hso Pek Hpa 687-711 bro
25) named unknown 711-739 bro
26) Hso Saw Hpa 739-761 son
27) Hso Hom Hpa 761-797 son
28) Hso Um Hpa 797-815 son
29) Hso Hat Hpa 815-860 son
30) Hso Kat Hpa 860-897 son
31) Hso Htam Hpa 897-912 son
32) name unknown 912-947 bro
33) Hso Hkan Hpa 947-954 son
34) Hso Paw Hpa 954-994 bro
35) Hso Mawk Hpa 994-1022 son
36) Hso Sum Hpa 1022-1028 son
37) Hso Sam Hpa 1028-1064 son
38) Hso Rit Hpa 1064-1086 nephew
39) Hso Hom Hpa 1086-1119 son
40) Hso Sum Hpa 1119-1137 son
41) Hso Hsawng Hpa 1137-1205 son
42) Sawn Möng Hawna 1205-1228 bro
43) name unknown 1228-1276 son
44) Sao Hkun Pe 1276-1324 cousin
45) Hkun Kyaw Awng 1324-1367 bro
46) Hkun Kyaw Nwe 1367-1401 son
47) Sao Kern Hpa 1401-1423 son
48) Sao Loi San Hpa 1423-1438 nephew
49) Hso Wei Hpa 1438-1448 cousin
50) Hso Hom Hpa 1448-1454 son
51) name unknown 1454-1461 bro
52) Sao Peng Hpa 1461-1471 bro
53) Hso Pek Hpa 1471-1479 son
54) Hso Haw Hpa 1479-1487 bro
55) Hso Sum Hpa 1487-1519 bro
56) Sao Hkun Möng 1519-1547 son
57) Sao Hom Hpa 1547-1565 son
58) Hso Hom Hpa 1565-1584 son
59) Hso Hkai Hpa 1584-1597 son
60) Sao Hkam Leng 1597-1636 son
61) Sao Hswe Hking 1636-1655 son
62) Hso Sam Hpa 1655-1675 son
63) Hso Wei Hpa 1675-1702 son
64) Sao Okka Wara 1702-1714 bro
65) Sao Okka Zeya 1714-1718 bro
66) Sao Sam Myo 1718-1722 bro
67) Sao Hkun Neng 1722-1752 bro
68) Sao Sawra Yawta 1752-1767 son of Okka Wara
69) Sao Myat Hsan Te 1767-1788 son
70) Sao Hswe Kya 1788-1809 son
71) Hkun Hkwi 1809-1843 son
72) Hkun Paw 1843-1853 bro
73) Sao Kya Htun 1853-1858 son of Sao Hswe Kya
74) Hkun Myat Than 1858-1866
75) Sao Kya Hkeng (Sao Hkun Hseng deposed 1882-86) (d. 1902) 1st time 1866-1882 son of Sao Kya Htun
76) Sao Hlaing Pa 1882-1886 son of King Mindon Min
77) Mar 1886-8 May 1902 Sao Kya Hkeng (Sao Hkun Hseng) 2nd time son of Sao Kya Htun
78) Sao Hkun Hke (b. 1872 - d. 1928) (from 2 Jan 1928, Sir Sao Hke) 8 May 1902-May 1928 son
79) Sao Ohn Kya (b. 1893 - d. 1938) 1928-Jul 1938 son
___Administered by British India 1938-1947___
80) Sao Kya Hseng (b. 1924 - d. 1962) 1947–1959 son.

=== Pretender ===
- Sao Kya Hseng (1959–1962)
- Sao Oo Kya (1962-)

== Climate ==
Hsipaw has a tropical savanna climate (Köppen Aw) bordering upon a humid subtropical climate (Cwa). There is a distinct winter dry season (November–April) and summer wet season (May–October). Temperatures are very warm to hot throughout the year; the winter months (December–February) are milder with quite cool mornings.

Climate data for Hsipaw, elevation 436 m (1,430 ft), (1981–2010 extremes 2001–2010)
Month	Jan	Feb	Mar	Apr	May	Jun	Jul	Aug	Sep	Oct	Nov	Dec	Year
Record high °C (°F)	33.4 (92.1)	35.0 (95.0)	42.3 (108.1)	41.0 (105.8)	42.0 (107.6)	38.0 (100.4)	37.0 (98.6)	36.2 (97.2)	38.0 (100.4)	36.0 (96.8)	33.0 (91.4)	32.0 (89.6)	42.3 (108.1)
Mean daily maximum °C (°F)	27.2 (81.0)	29.9 (85.8)	33.4 (92.1)	35.1 (95.2)	33.4 (92.1)	32.2 (90.0)	31.4 (88.5)	31.5 (88.7)	31.8 (89.2)	31.0 (87.8)	28.7 (83.7)	26.6 (79.9)	31.0 (87.8)
Mean daily minimum °C (°F)	9.3 (48.7)	9.5 (49.1)	12.8 (55.0)	18.1 (64.6)	21.5 (70.7)	23.5 (74.3)	23.6 (74.5)	23.4 (74.1)	22.5 (72.5)	20.5 (68.9)	16.2 (61.2)	12.0 (53.6)	17.7 (63.9)
Record low °C (°F)	4.0 (39.2)	5.0 (41.0)	7.0 (44.6)	13.8 (56.8)	16.9 (62.4)	21.0 (69.8)	21.0 (69.8)	21.0 (69.8)	18.0 (64.4)	13.3 (55.9)	10.7 (51.3)	5.0 (41.0)	4.0 (39.2)
Average rainfall mm (inches)	7.3 (0.29)	21.5 (0.85)	30.1 (1.19)	65.8 (2.59)	159.9 (6.30)	183.3 (7.22)	329.3 (12.96)	336.3 (13.24)	194.3 (7.65)	78.6 (3.09)	48.6 (1.91)	12.6 (0.50)	1,467.6 (57.78)
Source: Norwegian Meteorological Institute

== Gallery ==
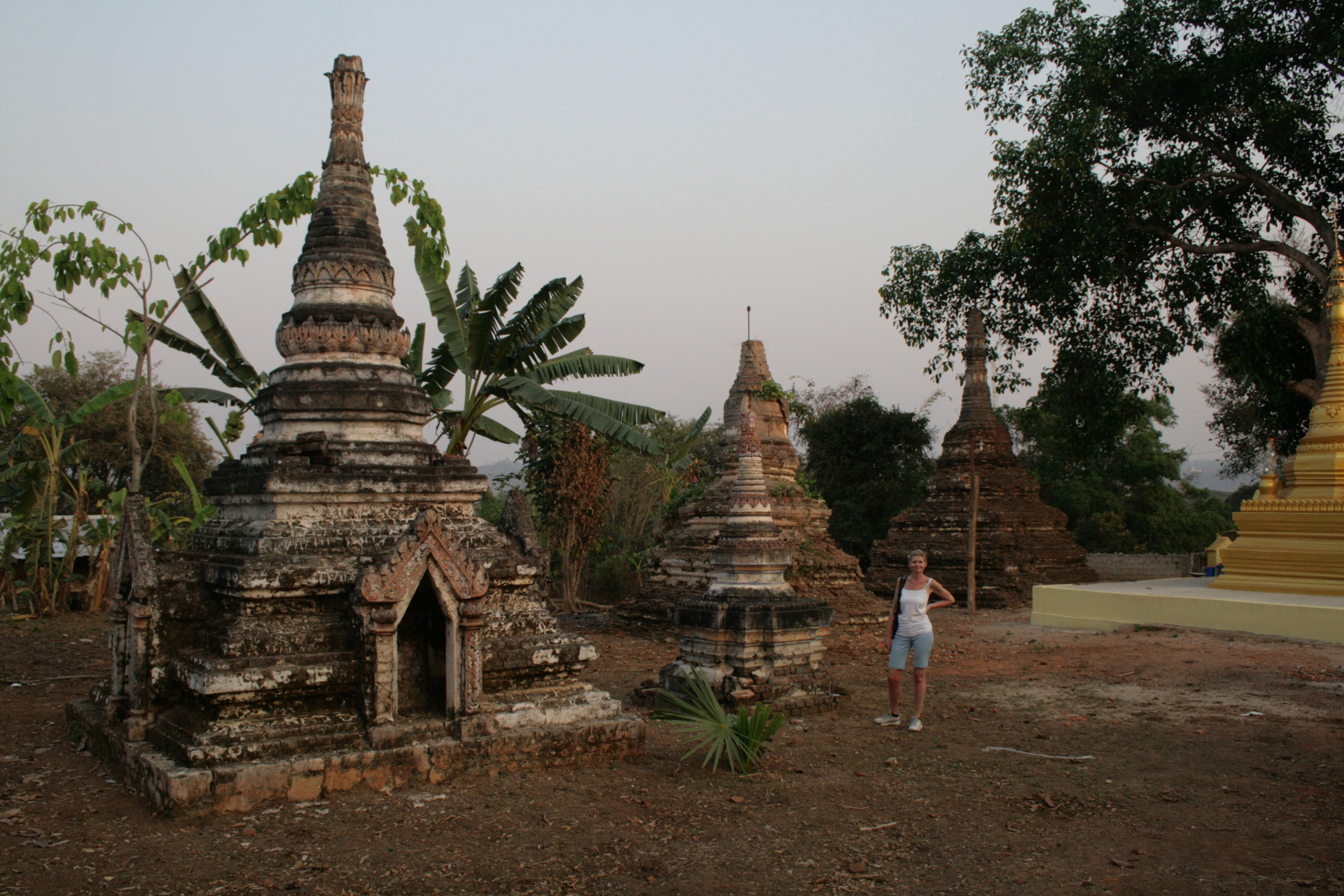
"Little Bagan" (2017)

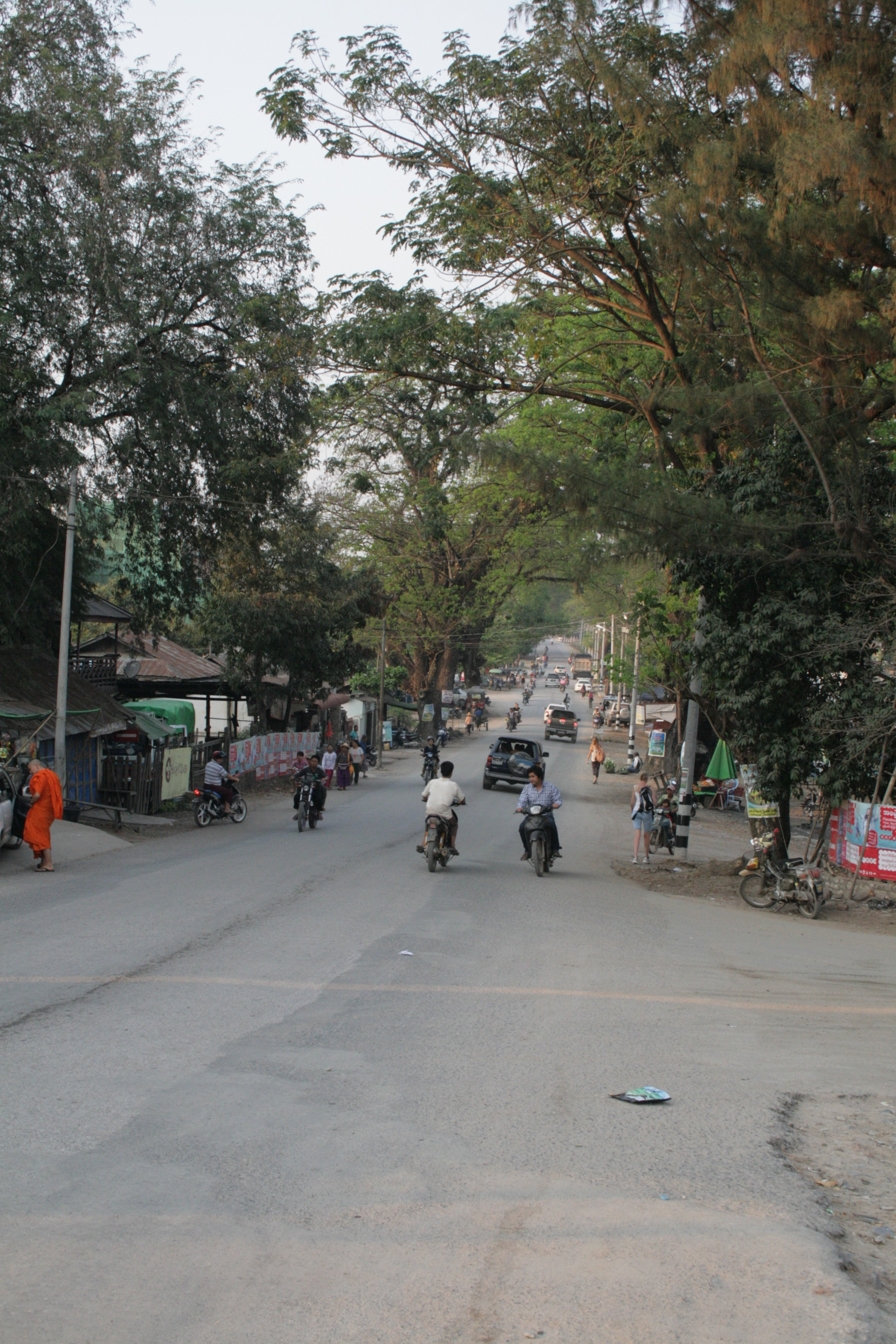
Main road (north to south)

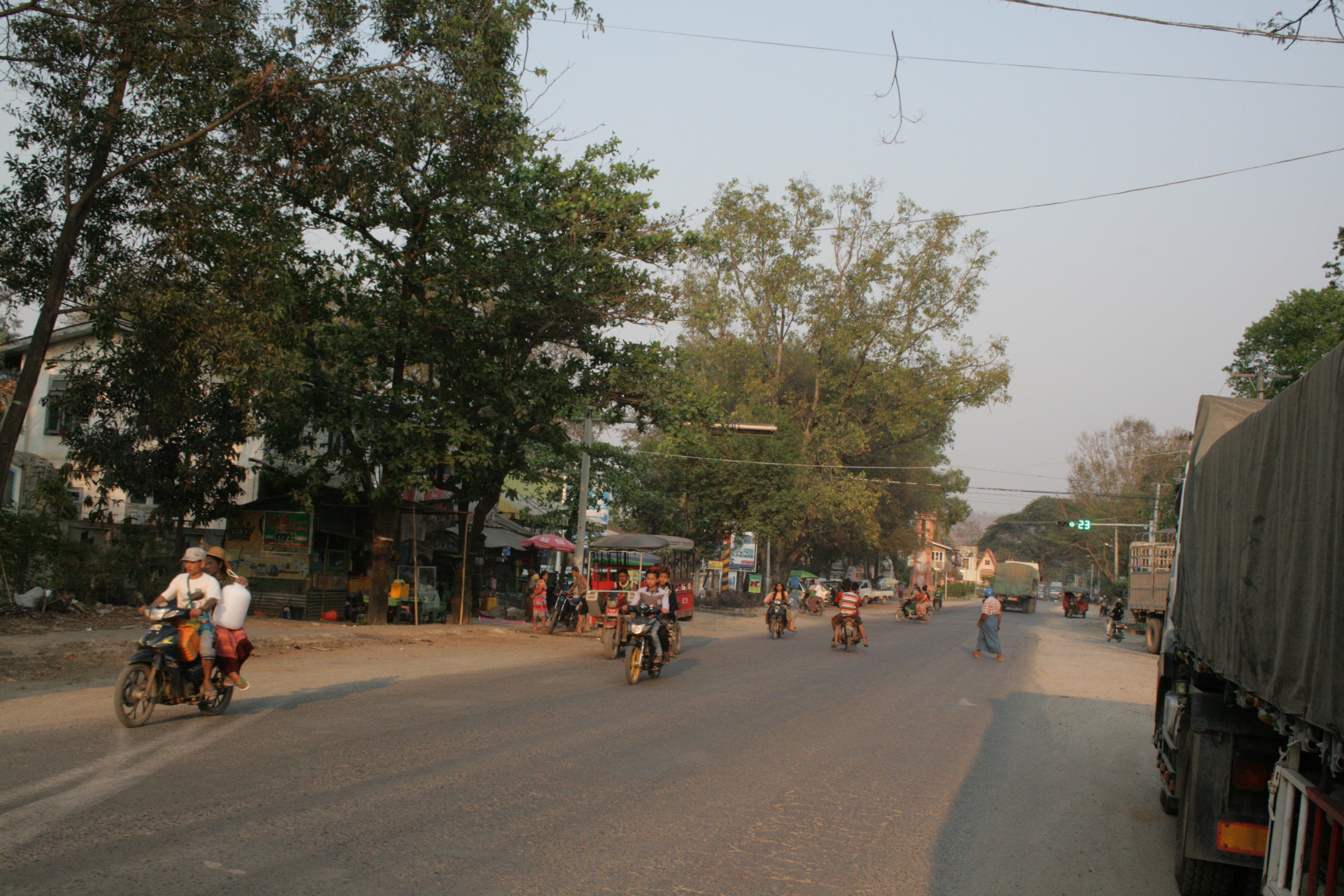
Mandalay-Lashio Rd

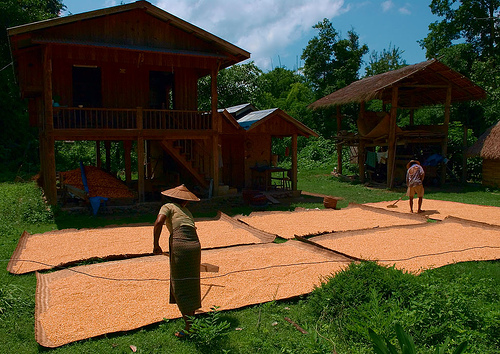
Local houses

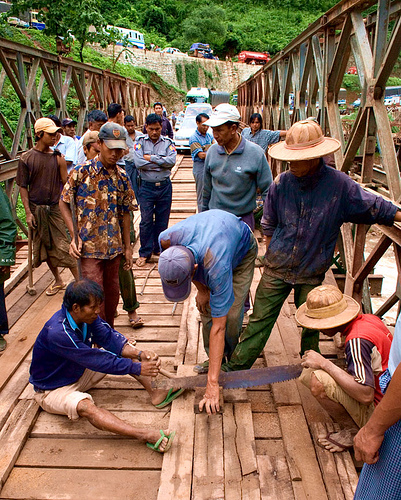
Locals maintaining a bridge

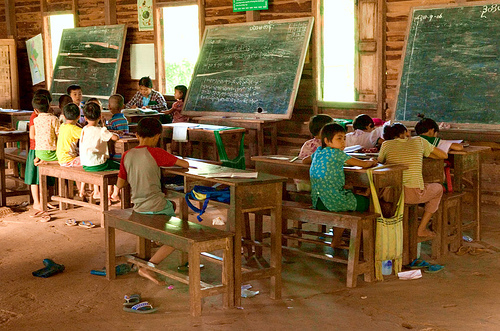
The village primary school
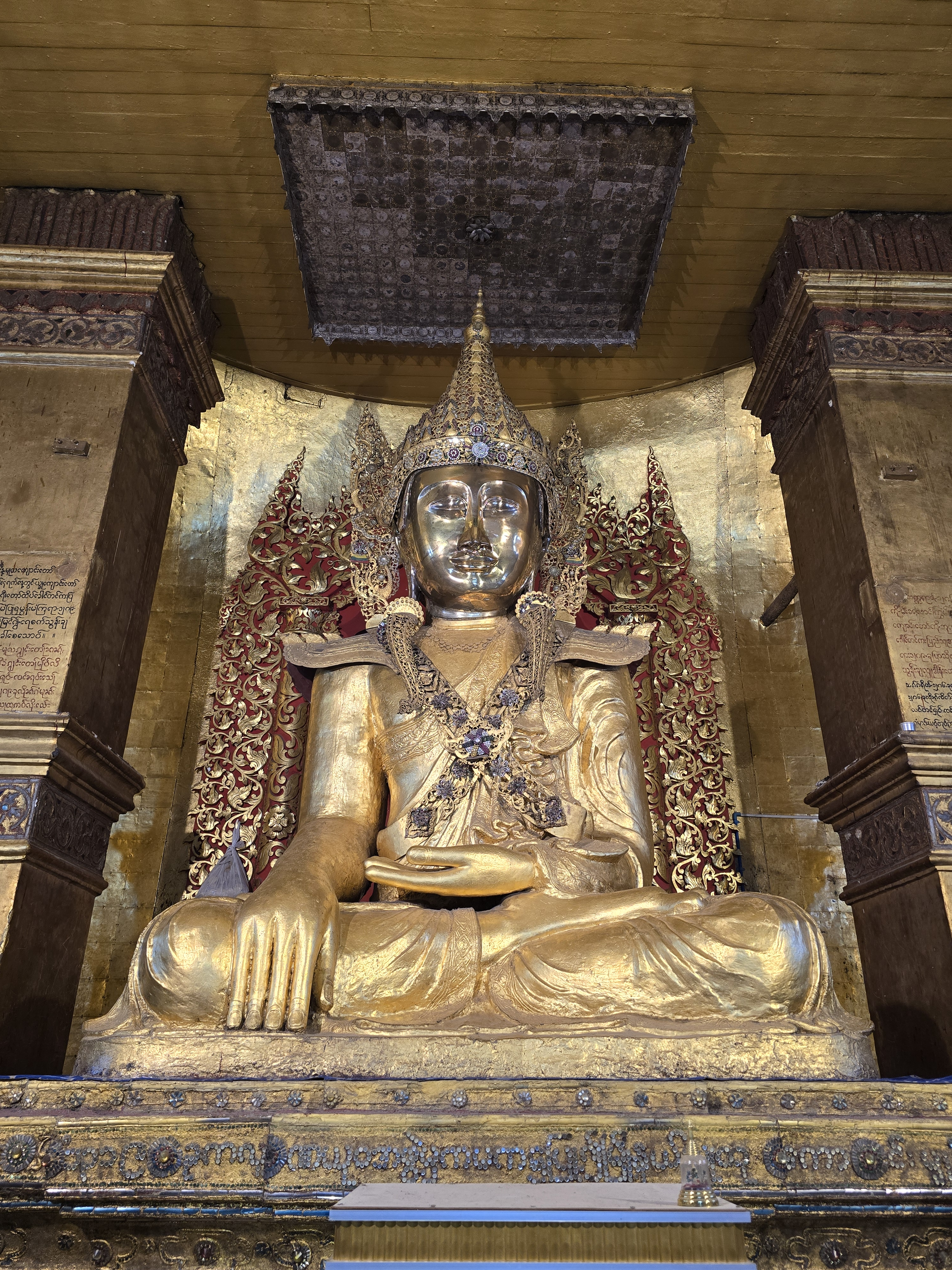
Hsipaw Mahamuni Buddha Statue
