= Prince Amyint =

Burmese prince, son of King Alaungpaya (1743–1777)

- Thuriya Dhammaraja
- Born: 1743; Kingdom of Burma
- Died: 1777 (aged 33–34); Kingdom of Burma
- House: Konbaung dynasty
- Father: Alaungpaya

Prince Amyint (1743–1777) was a Burmese royal prince and a son of Alaungpaya, the founder of the Konbaung dynasty. He held the royal title Thuriya Dhammaraja and was recognized as a senior member of the royal family during the reign of Hsinbyushin. Prince Amyint is recorded in Burmese chronicles as participating in ceremonial functions and holding royal duties appropriate to his rank.

== Life ==
Prince Amyint was born in 1743 in the Kingdom of Burma. He was one of the sons of King Alaungpaya, who established the Konbaung dynasty after unifying Burma. Little is known about his mother from historical sources. During the reign of Hsinbyushin, on the 2nd waxing day of Nayon, 1126 ME, the great Royal Audience was held, and titles were conferred upon royal relatives and ministers. On the 10th waxing day of Nayon, 1126 ME, Prince Amyint was granted the title of Thuriya Dhammaraja. His name appeared in the royal records along with other princes, ministers, and officials, demonstrating his recognized position within the royal court.

Prince Amyint died in 1777 in the Kingdom of Burma at the age of 34. Details about his burial or posthumous recognition remain unclear in the historical chronicles.
