= Bodawpaya =

Bodawpaya ဘိုးတော်ဘုရား
- King of Konbaung, Prince of Badon, Badon King, Royal Grandfather
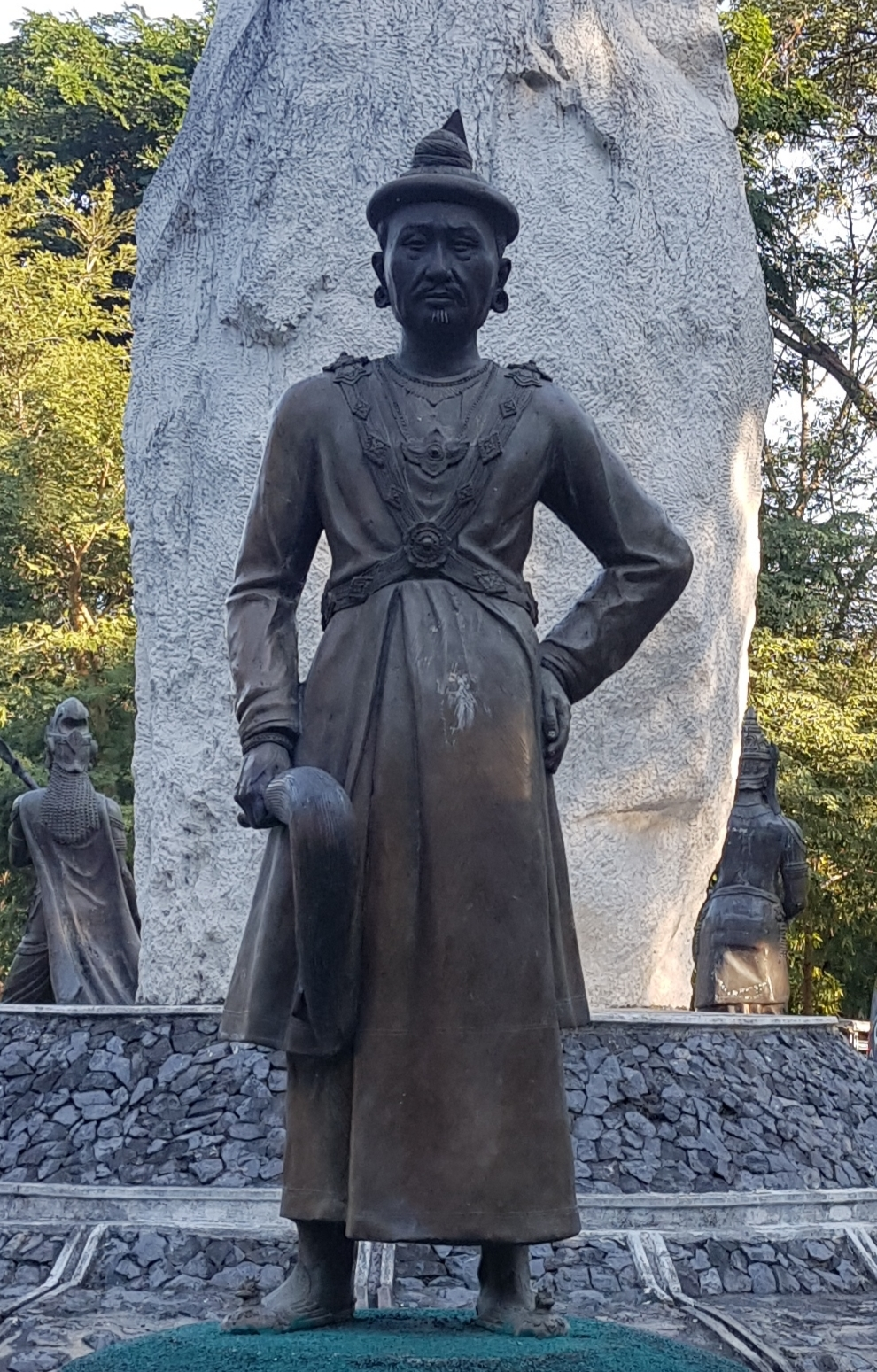
- Statute of Bodawpaya at Mandalay Palace

King of Burma
- Reign: 11 February 1782 – 5 June 1819
- Predecessor: Phaungka
- Successor: Bagyidaw
- Born: Maung Waing မောင်ဝိုင်း 11 March 1745; Moksobo
- Died: 5 June 1819 (aged 74); Amarapura
- Burial: Amarapura
- Consort: Me Lun Me; 207 queens in total
- Issue: 62 sons, 58 daughters including: Thado Minsaw
Regnal name
- Siripavaratilokapaṇdita Mahādhammarājadhirāja (သီရိပဝရ တိလောကပဏ္ဍိတ မဟာဓမ္မရာဇာဓိရာဇာ)
- House: Konbaung
- Father: Alaungpaya
- Mother: Yun San
- Religion: Theravada Buddhism

Bodawpaya (Burmese: ဘိုးတော်ဘုရား, pronounced [bódɔ̀ pʰəjá]; Thai: ปดุง; 11 March 1745 – 5 June 1819) was the sixth king of the Konbaung dynasty of Burma. Born Maung Shwe Waing and later Badon Min, he was the fourth son of Alaungpaya, founder of the dynasty and the Third Burmese Empire. He was proclaimed king after deposing his nephew Phaungkaza Maung Maung, son of his eldest brother Naungdawgyi, at Ava. Bodawpaya moved the royal capital back to Amarapura in 1782. He was titled Hsinbyumyashin (lit. 'Lord of the White Elephants'), not to be confused with his older brother Hsinbyushin. However, he became known to posterity as Bodawpaya (Grandsire) in relation to his successor, his grandson Bagyidaw (Royal Elder Uncle), who in turn was given this name in relation to his nephew Mindon Min. He fathered 70 sons and 67 daughters by about 54 consorts.

== Military expeditions ==
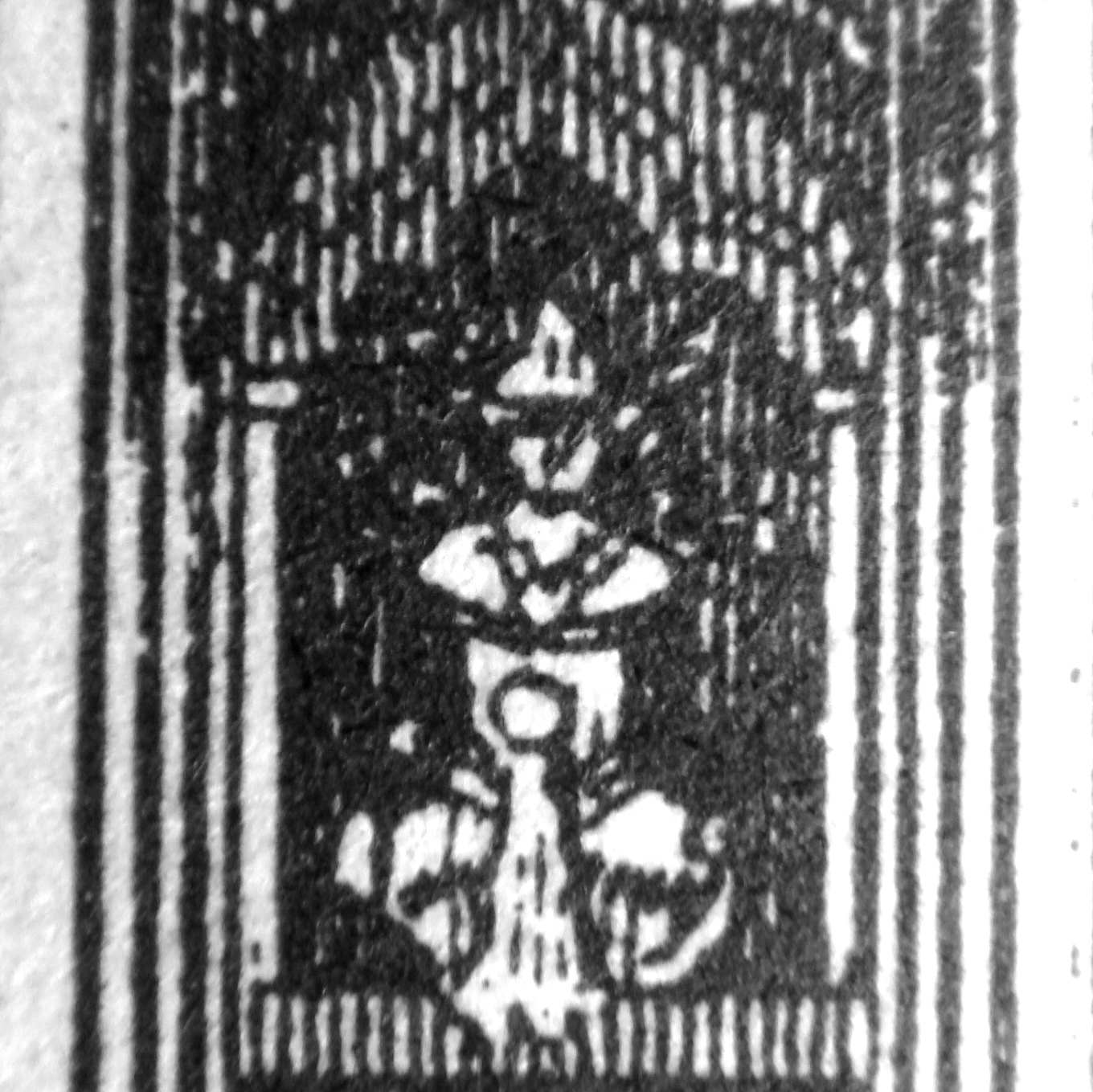
Depiction of King Bodawpaya at the Amarapura palace in 1795 (British Embassy of Michael Symes).

Also known as Bodaw U Waing, he invaded Arakan in 1784, sending his royal armies led by his son, the Heir Apparent Thado Minsaw, across the Western Yoma range of mountains. The capital of Arakan Mrauk U was captured on the last day of 1784. The Mahamuni Buddha image, among other treasures such as the Khmer bronze statues, was brought back to mainland Burma; these can still be seen in Mandalay. Also taken were 20,000 captives as slaves to pagodas and temples, and the nobility at Amarapura. Once Arakan was annexed as a province of Burma, its borders became contiguous with British India. The Arakanese revolted in 1794, and the British Governor of India Sir John Shore (later Lord Teignmouth) sent Captain Michael Symes on an embassy, fully equipped to gather as much information as possible about the country, to the Court of Ava as the kingdom was still known to the Western world.

Bodawpaya invaded Siam in 1785, and was defeated. The Governor of Tavoy revolted in 1791 with the aid of the Siamese, but a punitive expedition sent by Bodawpaya by sea laid siege ending in peace negotiations in 1793 and the ceding of the Tenasserim coast to the Burmese. He invaded Siam again in 1809, but was fended off by Maha Senanurak. The Burmese loss of Lan Na during the failed invasion proved to be the end of their 200-year rule.

In 1816, the Ahom governor of Guwahati in Assam, Badan Chandra Borphukan, visited the court of Bodawpaya to seek help in order to defeat his political rival Purnananda Burhagohain, the Prime Minister of Ahom Kingdom in Assam. A strong force of 16,000 under the command of Gen. Maha Minhla Minkhaung was sent with Badan Chandra Borphukan. The Burmese force entered Assam in January 1817 and defeated the Assamese force in the battle of Ghiladhari. Meanwhile, Purnananda Burhagohain died, and his son Ruchinath Burhagohain fled to Guwahati. The reigning Ahom king Chandrakanta Singha came to terms with Badan Chandra Borphukan and his Burmese allies. The King appointed Borphukan as Mantri Phukan (Prime Minister), and an Ahom princess, Hemo Aideo, was given in marriage to Burmese King Bodawpaya along with many gifts. The Burmese force retired from Assam soon after. A year later, Borphukan was assassinated, and the Ahom king Chandrakanta Singha was deposed by rival political faction led by Purnananda's son Ruchinath Burhagohain. Chandrakanta Singha and the friends of Borphukan appealed to Bodawpaya for help. In February 1819, the Burmese forces invaded Assam for a second time and reinstalled Chandrakanta Singha on the throne of Assam.

== Religion and culture ==
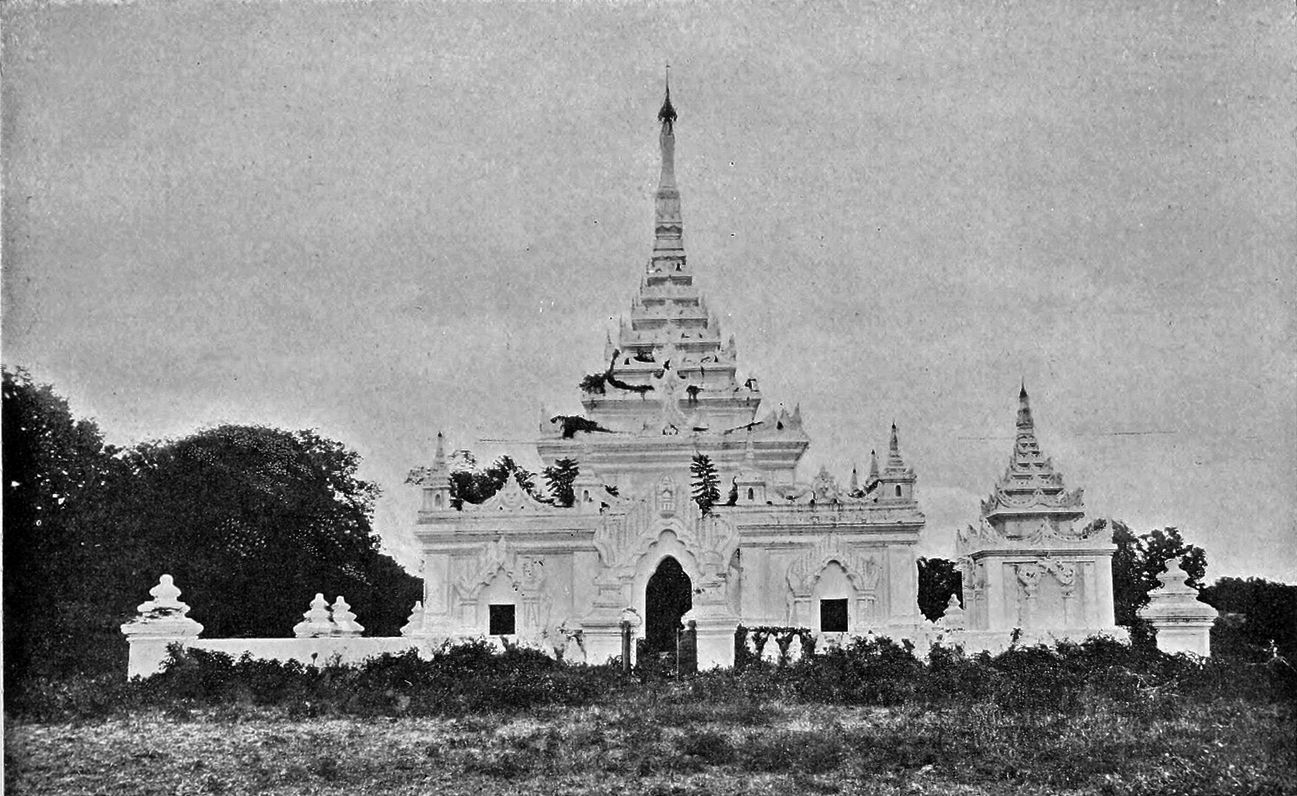
Bodawpaya's tomb in Amarapura.

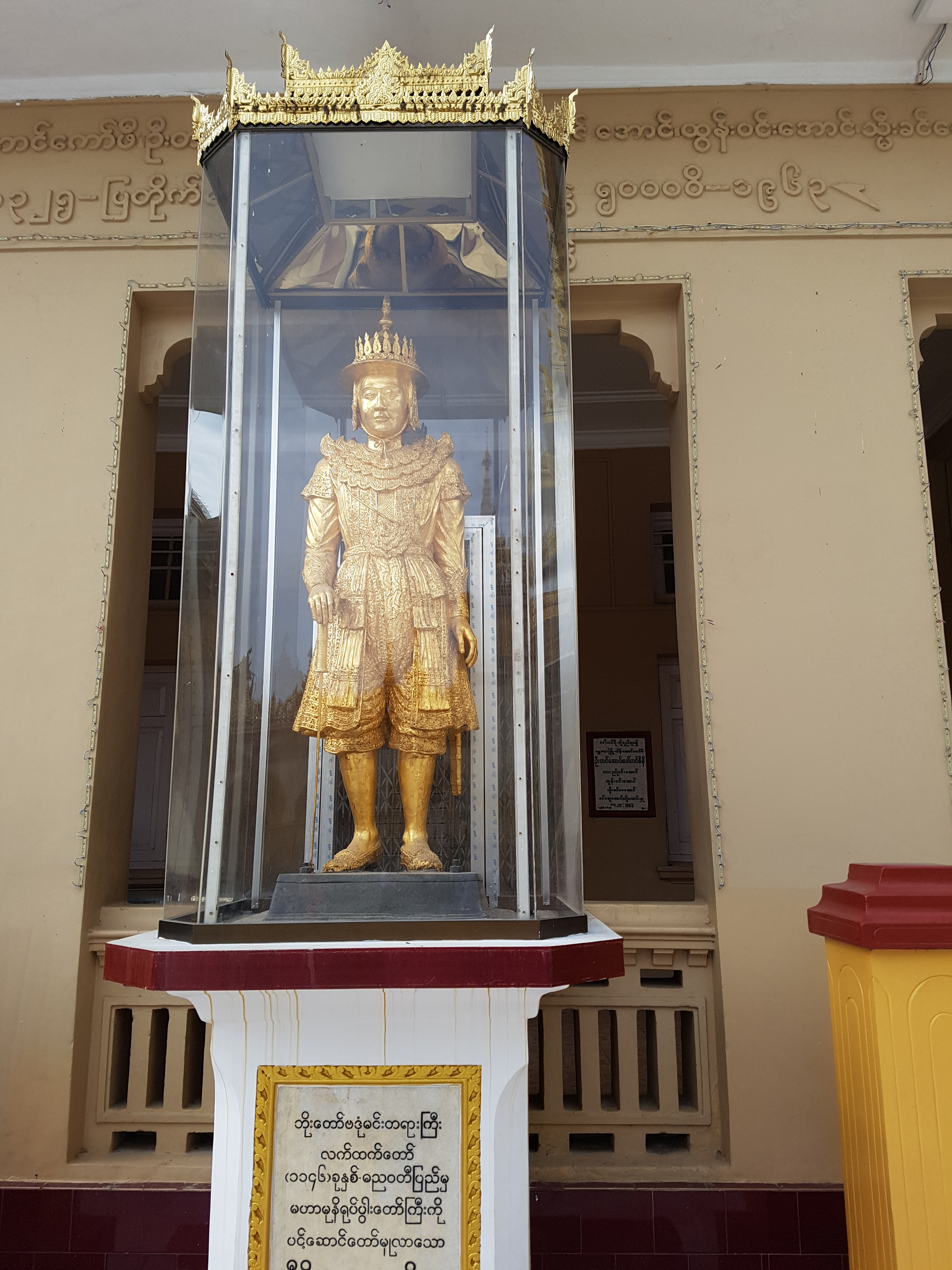
Statue of Shwedaung Min, son of Bodawpaya.

Bodawpaya proclaimed himself the next messianic Buddha or Maitreya (Arimittya), but his claim was firmly rejected by the Sangha. During his reign, scholarship flourished due to the discipline and stability achieved by establishing a chapter of Sangharajas or senior monks charged with the responsibility of safeguarding the purity of the Sangha. He had successfully arbitrated in favour of orthodoxy to cover both shoulders on the alms round in the controversy concerning the correct way of wearing the robes, and the Order of Monks was unified under the Thudhamma order. Burma became the custodian of Buddhism in the region, and the upasampada ordination was reintroduced to Sri Lanka, where it established the Amarapura Nikaya.

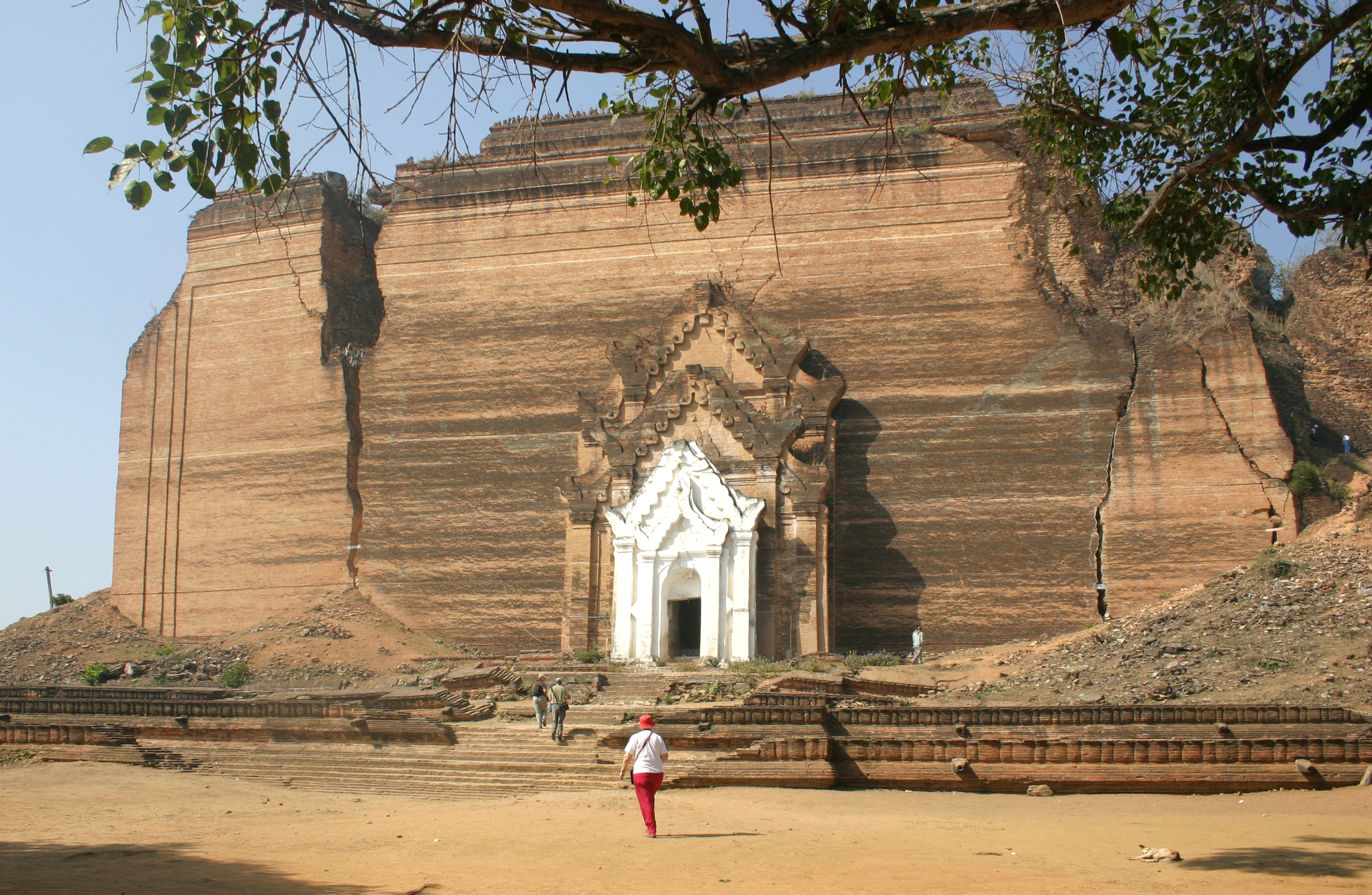
The unfinished Mantalagyi Stupa, intended to be the largest stupa in the world

In 1790, Bodawpaya began the construction of a gigantic stupa called Mantalagyi (Great Royal Stupa) at Mingun, 11 kilometres (6.8 mi) up the River Irrawaddy from Mandalay on the west bank. It was, however, never finished after a prophecy went round saying Payagyi lè apyi that, moksoe thonnya kap – "Once the great pagoda has been wrought, the Moksoe dynasty will come to nought" (ဘုရားကြီးလည်းအပြီးသတ် မုဆိုးသုညကပ်။). It was meant to have stood 150 metres (490 ft), tall enough to be seen from Shwebo in the west, the birthplace of the dynasty, towering above the Minwun Hills. An earthquake in 1838 left huge fissures in the structure, and also caused the heads of the two gigantic chinthes to fall into the river. There was also a gigantic 90 ton bell dedicated to the stupa called the Mingun Bell, cast between 1808 and 1810. It was the largest ringing bell in the world, when the larger bell in Moscow Kremlin, called the Tsar bell, broke, until the larger Bell of Good Luck was cast and first rung for the new year in 2000. During his reign Bodawpaya also proved to be a great patron of the performing arts; he appointed a minister called Thabin Wun (သဘင်ဝန်), and established strict regulations by royal decree (အမိန့်တော် a meint daw). He also ordered a major economic survey of the kingdom in 1784.

Bodawpaya was succeeded after his death in 1819 by his grandson, Prince of Sagaing, who later became known as Bagyidaw. The Heir Apparent, father of Bagyidaw, had died in 1808.

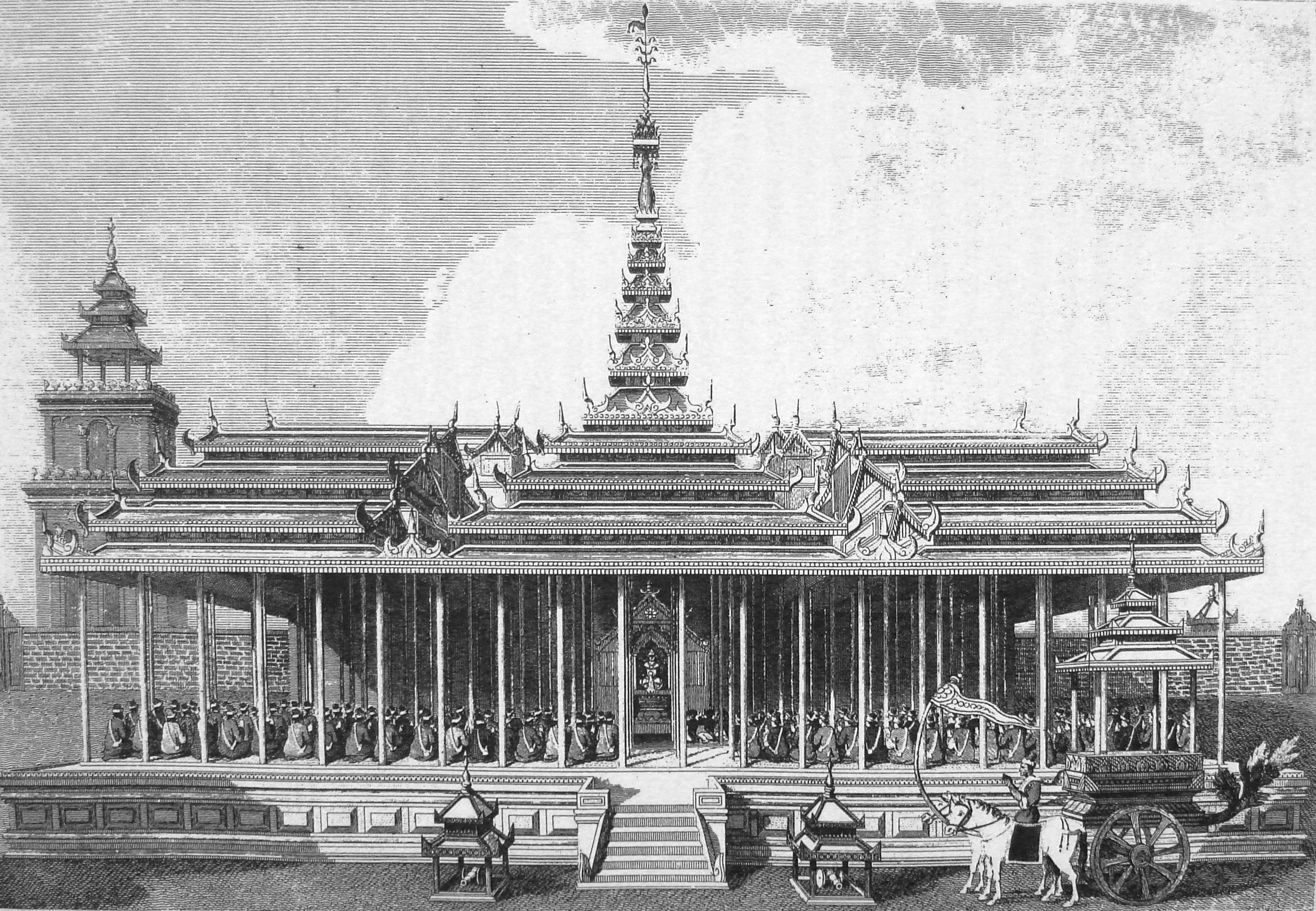
the Amarapura Royal Palace

== Bibliography ==
- Charney, Michael W. (2006). Powerful Learning: Buddhist Literati and the Throne in Burma's Last Dynasty, 1752–1885. Ann Arbor: University of Michigan.
- Koenig, William J. "The Burmese Polity, 1752–1819: Politics, Administration, and Social Organization in the early Kon-baung Period", Michigan Papers on South and Southeast Asia, Number 34, 1990.
- Lieberman, Victor B. " Political Consolidation in Burma Under the Early Konbaung Dynasty, 1752-c. 1820." Journal of Asia History 30.2 (1996): 152–168.
- Hall, D.G.E. (1960). Burma (3rd ed.). Hutchinson University Library. ISBN 978-1406735031.
- Harvey, G. E. (1925). History of Burma: From the Earliest Times to 10 March 1824. London: Frank Cass & Co. Ltd.
- Htin Aung, Maung (1967). A History of Burma. New York and London: Cambridge University Press.
- Letwe Nawrahta and Twinthin Taikwun (c. 1770). Hla Thamein (ed.). Alaungpaya Ayedawbon (in Burmese) (1961 ed.). Ministry of Culture, Union of Burma.
- Maung Maung Tin, U (1905). Konbaung Hset Maha Yazawin (in Burmese). Vol. 1–3 (2004 ed.). Yangon: Department of Universities History Research, University of Yangon.
- Myint-U, Thant (2006). The River of Lost Footsteps—Histories of Burma. Farrar, Straus and Giroux. ISBN 978-0-374-16342-6.
- Phayre, Lt. Gen. Sir Arthur P. (1883). History of Burma (1967 ed.). London: Susil Gupta.

Bodawpaya Konbaung Dynasty Born: 11 March 1745 Died: 5 June 1819
Regnal titles
Preceded by Phaungka	King of Burma; 11 February 1782 – 5 June 1819	Succeeded by Bagyidaw
Royal titles
Preceded by	Prince of Badon; 1764–1782	Succeeded by
