= Phaungkaza Maung Maung =

King of Konbaung for only 7 days, Lord of Phaungka

Phaungkaza Maung Maung ဖောင်းကားစား မောင်မောင်
- King of Konbaung, Lord of Phaungka

King of Burma
- Reign: 6–11 February 1782
- Predecessor: Singu
- Successor: Bodawpaya
- Born: Maung Maung မောင်မောင် 15 September 1763 (Note: The Konbaung Set Yazawin chronicle (Konbaung Set Vol. 1 2004: 381) says he was born on Thursday, 6th waxing of Thadingyut 1125 ME, which translates to Monday, 12 September 1763. The correct date should be 9th waxing of Thadingyut.); Thursday, 9th waxing of Thadingyut 1125 ME; Sagaing
- Died: 11 February 1782 (aged 18); Monday, 14th waning of Tabodwe 1143 ME; Ava (Inwa)
- Burial: Ava
- Consort: Shin Bai Toke two queens in total
- House: Konbaung
- Father: Naungdawgyi
- Mother: Shin Hpo U
- Religion: Theravada Buddhism

Phaungkaza Maung Maung (Burmese: ဖောင်းကားစား မောင်မောင် [pʰàʊɰ̃ɡázá màʊɰ̃ màʊɰ̃]; 15 September 1763 – 11 February 1782) was the fifth king of the Konbaung Dynasty of Burma, whose reign lasted six days. Maung Maung, the eldest son of Naungdawgyi, the second king of the Konbaung Dynasty, and Chief queen Shin Hpo U. He was granted the appenage of Phaungga in fief. On 6 February 1782, the 18-year-old Prince of Phaungka pretended to be a king and entered the palace and seized the throne while his cousin King Singu pilgrimaging to Anyar Thiha Taw Pagoda. Phaungkaza Maung Maung was the shortest lived king among the Konbaung Kings.

Upon ascending the throne, Phaungkaza Maung Maung invited his personal astrologer-monk—renowned for his mastery of Vedic astrology and astronomy—to the palace to offer alms. During the ceremony, the monk subtly advised the king to "clear the kukko trees (lebbeck) from the western side." This was actually a veiled reference rooted in the Vinaya (Buddhist disciplinary code), implying the need to remove the Monday-born Prince Badon (later King Bodawpaya), a potential rival. However, the young and inexperienced king misunderstood the advice literally and ordered the actual kukko trees near the palace to be cut down. His uncle Prince Badon quickly came to the palace and deposed him on 11 February 1782. Maung Maung and his chief queen were drowned to death on the same day.

== Family ==
He had two queens, chief queen was Shin Bai Toke, daughter of U Shun, who was brother of the barn minister U Tun. She gave birth to a son who was named Maung Yike who rebelled against Bodawpaya in 1805, based in Kyun Hla Village. The second queen was Me Bwar, daughter of Min Khe Paung, who was a daughter of King Mahadhammaraza Dipadi, the last king of Toungoo dynasty of Burma. She did not bear any issue.

== Bibliography ==
- Maung Maung Tin, U (1905). Konbaung Set Yazawin (in Burmese). Vol. 1–3 (2004 ed.). Yangon: Department of Universities History Research, University of Yangon.

Phaungkaza Maung Maung Konbaung Dynasty Born: 15 September 1763 Died: 11 February 1782
Regnal titles
Preceded by Singu	King of Burma; 5 February 1782 – 11 February 1782	Succeeded by Bodawpaya
Royal titles
Preceded by	Prince of Phaungka; 17?? – 1782	Succeeded by
