= Min Nyo San =

Thiri Maha Dhamma Yaza Min Nyo San မင်းညိုစံ

Mayor of Moksobo
- Reign: 1710s – 1736
- Successor: Aung Zeya
- Born: c. 1690s
- Died: c. 1760s Shwebo
- Spouse: Saw Nyein Oo
- Issue: Aung Zeya
- Father: Min Sit Naing
- Mother: Khin Min Phyo
- Religion: Theravada Buddhism

Min Nyo San (Burmese: မင်းညိုစံ, pronounced [mɪ́ɴ ɲò sàɴ]) was the father of King Alaungpaya, the founder of the Konbaung Dynasty of Burma (Myanmar). He was the mayor (headman) of Moksobo, and descended from the family that governed the Mu valley since the 15th century. He was awarded the royal title "Thiri Maha Dhamma Yaza" after his son became king.

== Bibliography ==
- Letwe Nawrahta and Twinthin Taikwun (c. 1770). Hla Thamein (ed.). Alaungpaya Ayedawbon (in Burmese) (1961 ed.). Ministry of Culture, Union of Burma.
