= Ne Myo Nawrahta =

- နေမျိုး နော်ရထာ
- Born: Khin Latt, Mu valley
- Military career
- Allegiance: Konbaung Dynasty
- Branch: Royal Burmese Army
- Service years: April 1752 – May 1757
- Rank: General
- Conflicts: Konbaung-Hanthawaddy War
- Awards: Min Kyaw Sithu
- Other work: Mayor of Yangon

Ne Myo Nawrahta (Burmese: နေမျိုး နော်ရထာ, [nè mjó nɔ̀jətʰà]) was a Konbaung era general who later became the first mayor of Yangon. The general was one of the first Sixty Eight Commanders that Alaungpaya selected to fight in his resistance movement against the southern occupation forces of the Hanthawaddy in 1752. The future general was born Shwe Yi (ရွှေရည်) in a small village of Khin Latt (ခင်လတ်) in the Mu valley in present-day Sagaing Region.

He was appointed mayor of Yangon by Alaungpaya on 24 May 1757 (2nd waning of Waso 1119 ME). The king had just enlarged the former village of Dagon which he captured two years earlier to make it the main port city of his kingdom.
