= Saw Nyein Oo =

Maha Dewi Saw Nyein Oo စောငြိမ်းဦး
- Born: c. 1690s Sitoktara
- Died: c. 1760s Shwebo
- Spouse: Min Nyo San
- Issue: Aung Zeya
- Father: Siboktara Min
- Mother: ?
- Religion: Theravada Buddhism

Saw Nyein Oo (Burmese: စောငြိမ်းဦး, pronounced [sɔ́ ɲéɪ̯ɰ̃ ʔú]) was the mother of King Alaungpaya, the founder of the Konbaung Dynasty of Burma (Myanmar). She was awarded the royal title "Maha Dewi" after her second son became king.

== Bibliography ==
- Letwe Nawrahta and Twinthin Taikwun (c. 1770). Hla Thamein (ed.). Alaungpaya Ayedawbon (in Burmese) (1961 ed.). Ministry of Culture, Union of Burma.
