= Yun San =

Yun San ယွန်းစံ

Chief Queen Consort of Burma
- Tenure: 29 February 1752 – 11 May 1760
- Coronation: 17 April 1752
- Predecessor: Maha Nanda Dipadi Dewi
- Successor: Maha Mingala Yadana Dewi
- Born: 1713; Siboktara
- Died: 31 July 1771
- Spouse: Alaungpaya
- Issue: Six sons, four daughters, including Naungdawgyi; Hsinbyushin; Bodawpaya
Names
- Mahā Mangalā Ratanādhipati Sīrirājā Candādevī မဟာမင်္ဂလာရတနာဓိပတိသီရိရာဇာစန္ဒာဒေဝီ
- House: Siboktara
- Father: Thiri Yandaza U Phyo
- Mother: Daw Nyet
- Religion: Theravada Buddhism

Me Yun San (Burmese: မယ်ယွန်းစံ [mɛ̀ jʊ́ɰ̃ sàɰ̃]; 1713–31 July 1771) was the empress consort of King Alaungpaya of Burma (Myanmar), and the royal mother who gave birth to three kings of Konbaung Dynasty: Naungdawgyi, Hsinbyushin and Bodawpaya. She served as the regent while Alaungpaya went to war.

Alaungpaya had officially pronounced that all sons of Yun San would become kings in order of seniority. She is famous for her peace keeping efforts between her two eldest sons, Naungdawgyi and Hsinbyushin, regarding the succession to throne after Alaungpaya's death in 1760. She died during Hsinbyushin's reign in 1771.

== Bibliography ==
- Htin Aung, Maung (1967). A History of Burma. New York and London: Cambridge University Press.

Yun San Konbaung Dynasty Born: 1713 Died: 31 July 1771
Royal titles
Preceded by Maha Nanda Dipadi Dewi	Chief queen consort of Burma; 29 February 1752 – 11 May 1760	Succeeded by Maha Mingala Yadana Dewi
