= Naungdawgyi =

Naungdawgyi Dabayin Min နောင်တော်ကြီး

King of Burma
- Reign: Sunday, 12th Wanning of Kason 1122 - Monday, 9th Wanning of Nadaw 1125 (11 May 1760 – 28 November 1763)
- Coronation: Saturday, 14th Waxing of Wagaung, 1122; 26 July 1760
- Predecessor: Alaungpaya
- Successor: Hsinbyushin
- Born: Maung Lauk မောင်လောက် 10 August 1734; Tuesday, 11th waxing of Wagaung 1096 ME; Moksobo
- Died: Monday, 9th Wanning of Nadaw 1125; 28 November 1763 (aged 29); Sagaing
- Burial: Sagaing
- Consort: Shin Hpo U six queens in total
- Issue: 5 sons and 2 daughters including: Phaungka
Regnal name
- Siripavaradhammarāja သိရီပဝရဓမ္မရာဇာ
- House: Konbaung
- Father: Alaungpaya
- Mother: Yun San
- Religion: Theravada Buddhism

Dabayin Min (Burmese: ဒီပဲယင်းမင်း, "Prince of Dabayin"), commonly known as Naungdawgyi (Burmese: နောင်တော်ကြီး [nàʊɰ̃dɔ̀dʑí], lit. "Elder Brother"; 10 August 1734 – 28 November 1763), personal name Maung Lauk (မောင်လောက်), was the second king of Konbaung Dynasty of Burma (Myanmar), from 1760 to 1763. He was a top military commander in his father Alaungpaya's reunification campaigns of the country. As king, he spent much of his short reign suppressing multiple rebellions across the newly founded kingdom from Ava (Inwa) and Toungoo (Taungoo) to Martaban (Mottama) and Chiang Mai. The king suddenly died less than a year after he had successfully suppressed the rebellions. He was succeeded by his younger brother Hsinbyushin.

== Early life ==
Naungdawgyi was born Maung Lauk (မောင်လောက်) to Yun San and Aung Zeya (later King Alaungpaya) on 10 August 1736 (Tuesday, 11th waxing of Wagaung 1096 ME) in a small village of Moksobo, about 60 miles northwest of Ava (Inwa). He was the eldest child of the couple's nine children. In 1736, his father became the chief of Moksobo, and the deputy chief of the Mu valley, their home region.

Lauk grew up during the period in which the royal authority of the king at Ava had largely dissipated across the kingdom. He watched helplessly as the Meiteis ransack his home region year after year, and could not understand why the king could not prevent these repeated raids. Their sense of helplessness only deepened in 1740, the Mon of Lower Burma broke away, and founded the Restored Hanthawaddy Kingdom centered in Pegu (Bago). Throughout his teens, Lauk and his fellow Upper Burmans watched how Pegu was increasingly winning the war against Ava.

== Heir-apparent and commander ==
By the time Hanthawaddy armies captured Ava in March 1752, his father had persuaded the people of Mu valley to join him in his resistance effort, declared himself king with the royal style of Alaungpaya (lit: The Future Buddha), and founded the Konbaung Dynasty. As the eldest son, Naungdawgyi was appointed the heir apparent although their self-styled "kingdom" consisted of just 46 villages in the Mu valley.

Still just 17, Naungdawgyi fought alongside his father's best commanders against the invading forces of Pegu. Though not as talented as his younger brother Hsinbyushin (Maung Ywa), two years his junior, Naungdawgyi proved to be a top military commander in his own right, leading armies in the Konbaung military campaigns that defeated the Restored Hanthawaddy Kingdom in 1757.

He stayed behind managing the kingdom on his father's behalf during Alaungpaya's later campaigns: Manipur in 1758 and Siam (1759–1760). His father died from a sudden illness in the Siamese campaign in May 1760.

== Succession crisis ==
As the heir-apparent, Naugndawgyi was in line to succeed Alaungpaya who had pronounced that all of his six sons by his first wife would become king in the order of seniority. Yet the succession was not smooth. Throughout Burmese monarchy, succession was usually associated with rebellions by vassal kings and governors, coups, and/or bloody purges. Naungdawgyi's accession was no exception.

The first threat to his authority came from his eldest younger brother Hsinbyushin, who sought the army's support for his attempt at the throne. Hsinbyushin did not get the support but Naungdawgyi forgave his brother at the queen mother's intercession. Naungdawgyi was crowned on 26 July 1760 at Sagaing, and ascended the Peacock throne at Shwebo on 9 February 1761 with the reign name of Thiri Pawara Maha Dhammayaza (Burmese: သိရီပဝရဓမ္မရာဇာ; Pali: Siripavaradhammarāja). Following Alaungpaya's wishes, Hsinbyushin was made the heir-apparent.

== Rebellions ==
Naungdawgyi faced multiple rebellions during his short reign: one by Gen. Minkhaung Nawrahta (1761), two separate ones by the vassal states of Toungoo (1761–1762) and Lan Na (1761–1763). Another vassal state Manipur also came under attack by Manipuri rebels in 1763.

=== Ava ===
Naungdawgyi forgave Hsinbyushin possibly because he was more concerned with a possible insurrection by the army. He had incurred distrust among the army command because he executed two of the generals he disliked as soon as he became king. One of his father's most trusted generals Minkhaung Nawrahta, with whom Naungdawgyi never got along, decided to rebel when he was summoned to see the new king. The general, who commanded deep respect among the troops, and his followers (12,000-strong) seized Ava on 25 June 1760. It took over five months for Naungdawgyi to retake the city in early December. The general was killed by a musket shot as he fled the city. Naungdawgyi was shaken by this tragedy, and was deeply remorseful at the death of one of his father's brothers-in-arms.

=== Toungoo ===
But worse was yet to come. In the following year, two vassal states, Toungoo and Lan Na, revolted. Manipur, another vassal state, came under attack by rebels. The leader of the Toungoo rebellion was none other than Naungdawgyi's uncle, Thado Theinkhathu, who along with a few senior army commanders had decided to challenge his nephew. The Toungoo rebellion was largely a protest at the treatment given to Minkhaung Nawrahta. Naungdawgyi with his army now marched to Toungoo, and laid siege to the city. (Hsinbyushin provided no help to his brother.) It was not until January 1762 that the city surrendered. Weary over the developments, Naungdawgyi pardoned his uncle and the commanders. (Among the pardoned officers included the likes of Balamindin who would go on to lead the army in future wars.)

=== Lan Na and Martaban ===
While Naungdawgyi was laying siege to the Toungoo, the vassal king loyal of Lan Na at Chiang Mai was overthrown. (Southern Lan Na had come back to the fold only in 1757. Prior, the Ping valley of southern Lan Na had been in revolt since 1725.) The leader of the rebellion, Chao Khihut, immediately began defensive preparations, as well as implementing a preemptive offensive strategy. Khihut allowed Talaban, the top Restored Hanthawaddy general who had been on the run, to use Chiang Mai as his base to raise an army to launch an attack. In late 1761, Talaban and his army entered Martaban (Mottama), and for a time, appeared to distract Naungdawgyi's army at Toungoo. But Talaban's army could not rally greater support among the Mon population in Lower Burma, and was driven back. Talaban fell back to the jungle between the Salween River (Thanlwin) and Moei River (present-day Mon State and Kayin State), reduced to conducting guerrilla warfare.

After Toungoo was captured, Naungdawgyi then sent an 8000-strong army to Chiang Mai. The Burmese army captured Chiang Mai in early 1763, and marched right up to the Chinese frontier, demonstrating Burmese control over the entire region.

By then, Talaban had also been captured. The army actually caught Talaban's family first. Talaban came out from hiding and offered his life in return for his family. Struck by chivalry, Naungdawgyi released them all, and took Talaban into his service.

=== Manipur ===
By early 1763, Naungdawgyi had suppressed all the rebellions. Unbeknown to him, Manipur was to be the next trouble spot. In April 1763, the Manipuri king who was driven out by Alaungpaya in 1758 tried to invade his former kingdom with an army that also included a small detachment of English East India Company troops. He had received the company's support in September 1762. But the invading army never made it to Manipur as it got bogged down on their way in Cachar. The English detachment was unprepared to march in terrible terrain.

== Anglo-Burmese relations ==
Fresh off the Negrais affair, the Anglo-Burmese relations remained decidedly frosty. While Naungdawgyi was laying siege to Ava, in September 1760, he received the English East India Company envoy Captain Walter Alves whose mission was to demand reparations for the Burmese sack of the English colony at Negrais in October 1759. The king refused to consider the demand but agreed to release English prisoners. He asked to resume trade as he was in urgent need of munitions. The English, still amid the Seven Years' War, did not deem the Burma trade profitable enough to resume trade.

Instead, the English entered into an agreement with the fugitive Manipuri king to provide military assistance in exchange for land and trade privileges. On 4 September 1762, the Company signed an agreement to provide a contingent of troops to drive out the Burmese from Manipur. In return, the Manipuri rebels promised to cede in perpetuity a rent-free land at a suitable place in Manipur for the installation of a factory and a fort, and also provide every facility for the promotion of trade with China. The Manipuris not only agreed to pay the expenses of English troops but also promised to compensate for the loss suffered by the English at Negrais.

While their first attempt to invade Manipur in 1763 had to be abandoned, Sigh's Manipuri resistance remained active with English help. (They would temporarily drive out the Burmese vassal king in 1764 before being driven back out by Hsinbyushin.)

== Death and succession ==
Naungdawgyi died in November 1763. He was only 29. According to historian Helen James, he died of scrofula, the same illness that inflicted his father and would also take his brother Hsinbyushin. Finally free of rebellions, the king had spent his last few months on works of merit building two pagodas on the Mahananda Lake near Shwebo. He was succeeded by his brother Hsinbyushin. He had five sons and two daughters.

== Bibliography ==
- Alves, Captain Walter. "Diary of the Proceedings of an Embassy to Burma in 1760" (PDF). SOAS. Archived from the original (PDF) on 2011-02-06.
- Bareh, Hamlet (2001). Encyclopaedia of North-East India. Vol. 3. New Delhi: Mittal Publications. ISBN 978-81-7099-790-0.
- Hall, D.G.E. (1960). Burma (3 ed.). Hutchinson University Library. ISBN 978-1-4067-3503-1.
- Harvey, G. E. (1925). History of Burma: From the Earliest Times to 10 March 1824. London: Frank Cass & Co. Ltd.
- Htin Aung, Maung (1967). A History of Burma. New York and London: Cambridge University Press.
- James, Helen (2004). "Burma-Siam Wars and Tenasserim". In Ooi, Keat Gin (ed.). Southeast Asia: a historical encyclopedia, from Angkor Wat to East Timor, Volume 2. ABC-CLIO. ISBN 1-57607-770-5.
- Kyaw Thet (1962). History of Union of Burma (in Burmese). Yangon: Yangon University Press.
- Maung Maung Tin, U (1905). Konbaung Hset Maha Yazawin (in Burmese). Vol. 1–3 (2004 ed.). Yangon: Department of Universities History Research, University of Yangon.
- Myint-U, Thant (2006). The River of Lost Footsteps—Histories of Burma. Farrar, Straus and Giroux. ISBN 978-0-374-16342-6.
- Phayre, Lt. Gen. Sir Arthur P. (1883). History of Burma (1967 ed.). London: Susil Gupta.
- Saratsawadi, Ongsakun (2005). Dolina W. Millar, Sandy M. Barron (ed.). History of Lan Na (2 ed.). Silkworm Books. ISBN 9789749575840.

Naungdawgyi Konbaung Dynasty Born: 10 August 1734 Died: 28 November 1763
Regnal titles
Preceded by Alaungpaya	King of Burma; 11 May 1760 – 28 November 1763	Succeeded by Hsinbyushin
Royal titles
Preceded by	Heir to the Burmese Throne as Prince of Dabayin; April 1752 – 11 May 1760	Succeeded by Hsinbyushin
