= Alaungpaya =

Founder of the Konbaung Empire

Alaungpaya အလောင်းဘုရား
- King of Konbaung
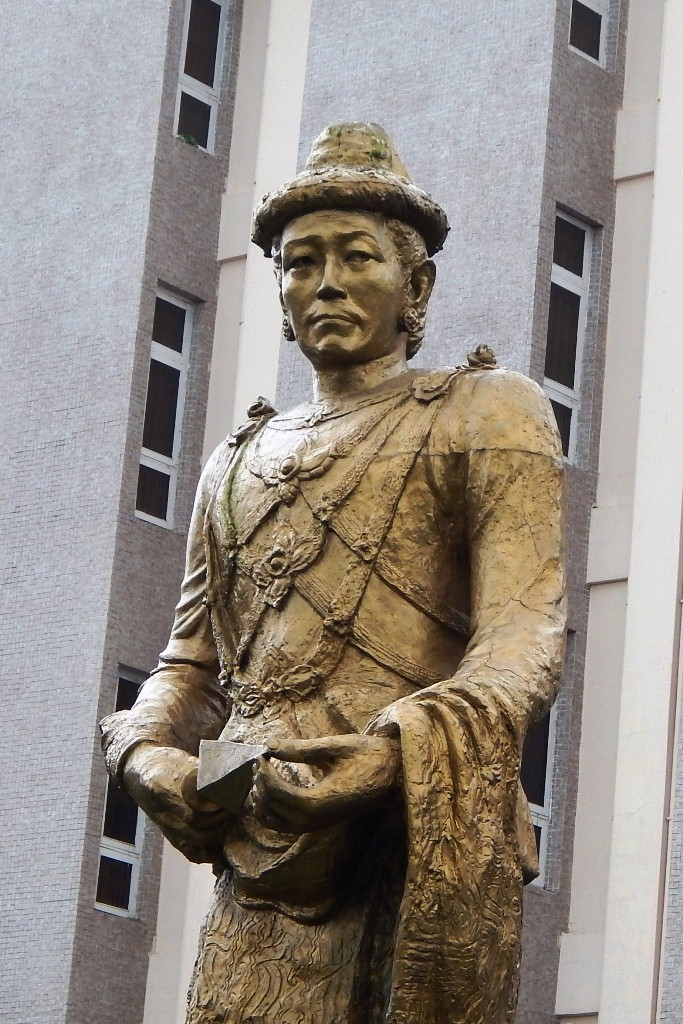
- Statue of Alaungpaya in front of the National Museum, Yangon

King of Burma
- Reign: 29 February 1752 – 11 May 1760
- Coronation: 17 April 1752
- Predecessor: Mahadhammaraza Dipadi
- Successor: Naungdawgyi
- Born: 24 August [O.S. 13 August] 1714; Friday, 1st waning of Tawthalin 1076 ME; Moksobo
- Died: 11 May 1760 (aged 45); Sunday, 12th waning of Kason 1122 ME; Kinywa, Martaban
- Burial: May 1760; Shwebo
- Spouse: Yun San
- Issue among others...: Naungdawgyi; Hsinbyushin; Bodawpaya
Names
- Sīri Pavara Vijaya Nanda Jatha Mahādhammarāja သီရိ ပဝရ ဝိဇယ နန္ဒ ဇဌ မဟာ ဓမ္မရာဇ
- House: Konbaung
- Father: Min Nyo San
- Mother: Saw Nyein Oo
- Religion: Theravada Buddhism

Alaungpaya (Burmese: အလောင်းဘုရား, pronounced [ʔəláʊɰ̃ pʰəjá]; also spelled Alaunghpaya or Alaung-Phra; 24 August [O.S. 13 August] 1714 – 11 May 1760) was the founder and first king of the Konbaung dynasty of Burma. By the time of his death from illness during his campaign in Siam, this former chief of a small village in Upper Burma had unified Burma, subdued Manipur, conquered Lan Na and launched successful attacks against the French and British East India companies who had given help to the Restored Hanthawaddy Kingdom. He added settlements around Dagon, and called the enlarged town Yangon.

He is considered one of the three greatest monarchs of Burma alongside Anawrahta and Bayinnaung for unifying Burma for the third time in Burmese history.

== Background ==
The future king was born Aung Zeya (အောင်ဇေယျ "Successful Victory") at Moksobo, a village of a few hundred households in the Mu River Valley about 100 km (62 mi) northwest of Ava (Inwa) on 24 August 1714 to Min Nyo San (မင်းညိုစံ) and his wife Saw Nyein Oo (စောငြိမ်းဦး). He was the second son of a lineage of gentry families that had administered the Mu Valley for generations. His father was a hereditary chief of Moksobo and his uncle, Kyawswa Htin (ကျော်စွာထင်), better known as Sitha Mingyi (စည်သာမင်းကြီး), was the lord of the Mu Valley District. Alaungpaya claimed descent from kings Mohnyin Thado, Narapati I and Thihathura of Ava, and ultimately the Pagan royal line. He came from a large family and was related by blood and by marriage to many other gentry families throughout the valley. In 1730, Alaungpaya married his first cousin Yun San (ယွန်းစံ), daughter of chief of a neighboring village, Siboktara (စည်ပုတ္တရာ). They went on to have six sons and three surviving daughters. (The fourth daughter died young.)

Family tree of King Alaungpaya (Note: See the king's family tree in Alaungpaya Ayedawbon (Letwe Nawrahta 1961: 12–13). Nawrahta I was the younger brother of King Mohnyin Thado, and commandant of the Northern Horse (မြောက်‌ဖက်ကိုးသင်း), a nine-battalion hereditary cavalry from the northern Mu valley. Furthermore, the name of "Sagaing Minthami" (lit. "Princess of Sagaing) in Ayedawbon is given here as Min Hla Htut per (Hmannan Vol. 2 2003: 83). Still per (Hmannan Vol. 2 2003: 83), Min Hla Htut and her husband Mingyi Phyu of Sagaing were first cousins, once removed.)

Atula Thiri	Narapati I of Ava; 1413–1468 r. 1442–1468
Thihathura of Ava; 1431–1480 r. 1468–1480	Ameitta Thiri	Nawrahta I of Myedu	Min Hla Htut of Sagaing	Mingyi Phyu of Sagaing
Bodaw Shin Medaw	Nawrahta II of Myedu
Min Thinkhaya	Min Shwe Chu
Min Ne Wun	Min Padamya	Min Ne Tun
Min Ye Saw	Min Ye Htwe	Khin Myo Hpaw
Hmantha Mingyi	Min Chit Ma-Nyi	Mingyi Shwe
Min Mya-Kon	Min Toe Khin	Min Nandi
Siboktara Min	Min Sit Naing of Talok	Khin Min Pyo
Saw Nyein Oo	Min Nyo San
Aung Zeya; 1714–1760 r. 1752–1760

== Chief of Moksobo and deputy chief of Mu valley ==
Aung Zeya grew up during a period in which the authority of Taungoo Dynasty was in rapid decline. The "palace kings" at Ava had been unable to defend against the Manipuri raids that had been ransacking increasingly deeper parts of Upper Burma since 1724. Ava had failed to recover southern Lanna (Chiang Mai), which had revolted in 1727, and did nothing to prevent the annexation of northern Shan States by the Manchu Qing dynasty in the 1730s.

The Mu Valley was directly on the path of Manipuri raids year after year. Although Burma (now Myanmar) was far larger than Manipur (now in India), Ava had been unable to defeat the raids or organize a punitive expedition to Manipur itself. The people watched helplessly as the raiders torched villages, ransacked pagodas, fired poisoned arrows, and took away captives.

It was during these troubled times in the absence of royal authority that men like Aung Zeya came forward. He assumed his father's responsibilities as chief of his village in his early twenties. A tall man for the times, (5-foot-11-inch in height (1.80 m) as described by an English envoy), the solidly built, sunburnt Aung Zeya displayed his natural ability to lead men and was viewed as a leader by his gentry peers throughout the valley. They began to take matters into their own hands to defend against the raids.

The sickly regime at Ava was wary of any potential rivals. In 1736, Taungoo Yaza, commander-in-chief of the army of Ava, summoned Aung Zeya to Ava to check if the village headman was a potential threat to the regime. Satisfied that the 22-year-old had no designs on the throne, Taungoo Yaza on behalf of the king bestowed the title Bala Nanda Kyaw (ဗလနန္ဒကျော်) to Aung Zeya. Aung Zeya became deputy to his uncle the lord of Mu Valley, and the administrative officer kyegaing (ကြေးကိုင်, [tɕéɡàɪɰ̃]), responsible for tax collection and for the preservation of order.

== Founding of Konbaung Dynasty ==
The authority of Ava continued to decline in the following years. In 1740, the Mon of Lower Burma broke away and founded the Restored Hanthawaddy Kingdom with the capital at Bago. Ava's feeble attempts to recover the south failed to make a dent. Low-grade warfare between Ava and Bago went on until late in 1751, when Bago launched its final assault, invading Upper Burma in full force. By early 1752, Hanthawaddy forces, aided by the French East India Company-supplied firearms and Dutch and Portuguese mercenaries, had reached the gates of Ava. The heir-apparent of Hanthawaddy, Upayaza, summoned all administrative officers in Upper Burma to submit. Some chose to cooperate, but others, like Aung Zeya, chose to resist.

Aung Zeya persuaded 46 villages in the Mu Valley to join him in resistance. He found a ready audience in "an exceptionally proud group of men and women" of Upper Burma who longed to redress the numerous humiliations that their once proud kingdom had suffered. On 29 February 1752 (Full moon of Tabaung 1113 ME), as the Hanthawaddy forces were about to breach the outer walls of Ava, Aung Zeya proclaimed himself king with the royal style of Alaungpaya ("One Who Is the Future Buddha", Maitreya) and founded the Konbaung Dynasty. His full royal style was Thiri Pawara Wizaya Nanda Zahta Maha Dhamma Yazadiyaza Alaung Mintayagyi (သီရိပဝရ ဝိဇယနန္ဒဇာထ မဟာဓမ္မ ရာဇာဓိရာဇာ အလောင်းမင်းတရားကြီး).

Not everyone was convinced, however. After Ava fell on 23 March 1752, Alaungpaya's own father, Nyo San, urged him to submit. He pointed out that although Alaungpaya had scores of enthusiastic men, they only had a few muskets, and that their little stockade did not stand a chance against a well-equipped Hanthawaddy army that had just sacked a heavily fortified Ava. Alaungpaya was undeterred, saying: "When fighting for your country, it matters little whether there are few or many. What does matter is that your comrades have true hearts and strong arms." He prepared the defenses by stockading his village, now renamed Shwebo, and building a moat around it. He had the jungle outside the stockade cleared, the ponds destroyed and the wells filled.

== Reunification of Burma (1752–1759) ==
=== Upper Burma (1752–1754) ===
Konbaung was only one among many other resistance forces that had independently sprung up across a panicked Upper Burma. Fortunately for the resistance forces, the Hanthawaddy command mistakenly equated their capture of Ava with the victory over Upper Burma, and withdrew two-thirds of the invasion force back to Bago, leaving just a third (less than 10,000 men) for what they considered a mop-up operation.

At first, the strategy seemed to work. Hanthawaddy forces established outposts as far north as present-day northern Sagaing Region and found allies in the Gwe Shan people of Madaya in present-day northern Mandalay Region.

Nonetheless, Alaungpaya's forces wiped out the first two Hanthawaddy detachments sent to secure his allegiance. Next, they survived the month-long siege by the Hanthawaddy army of several thousand led by General Talaban himself and drove out the invaders in a rout. The news spread. Soon, Alaungpaya was mustering a proper army from across the Mu Valley and beyond, using his family connections and appointing his fellow gentry leaders as his key lieutenants. Success drew fresh recruits everyday from many regions across Upper Burma. Most other resistance forces as well as officers from the disbanded Palace Guards had joined him with such arms as they retained. By October 1752, he had emerged the primary challenger to Hanthawaddy and driven out all Hanthawaddy outposts north of Ava as well as their allies, the Gwe Shan. A dozen legends gathered around his name. Men felt that when he led them they could not fail.

Despite repeated setbacks, Bago still did not send in reinforcements even as Alaungpaya consolidated his gains throughout Upper Burma. On 3 January 1754, Konbaung forces retook Ava. Alaungpaya now received homage from the nearer Shan States as far north as Momeik.

In March 1754, Hanthawaddy finally sent its entire army, laying siege to Ava and advancing up to Kyaukmyaung a few miles from Shwebo. Alaungpaya personally led the Konbaung counterattack and drove out the southern armies by May.

=== Lower Burma (1755–1757) ===
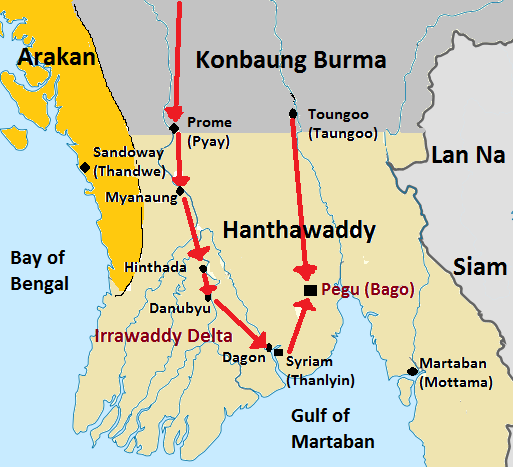
Konbaung invasion of Lower Burma 1755–1757. Tribute sent by Sandoway, Chiang Mai, Martaban, Tavoy after fall of Bago.

The conflict increasingly turned into an ethnic conflict between the Bamar north and the Mon south. The Hanthawaddy leadership escalated "self-defeating" policies of persecuting southern Bamars. They also executed the captive king of Taungoo in October 1754. Alaungpaya was only happy to exploit the situation, encouraging remaining Bamar troops to come over to him. Many did.

Swelled by levies from throughout Upper Burma, including Shan, Kachin, and Kuki contingents, he launched a massive invasion of Lower Burma in a blitzkrieg in January 1755. By May, his armies had conquered the entire Irrawaddy Delta and captured Dagon, which he renamed Yangon. However, his advance came to a sudden halt at the French-defended main port city of Thanlyin, which repelled several Konbaung charges.

Alaungpaya sought an alliance with the East India Company and also sought out more arms, but no alliance or arms materialized. Konbaung forces finally took the city after a 14-month siege in July 1756, ending the French intervention in the war. The Konbaung forces then overcame determined but vastly outnumbered Hanthawaddy defenses, and sacked Bago in May 1757. The 17-year-old kingdom was finished.

Afterwards, Chiang Mai and other states in present-day northwest Thailand, which had been in revolt since 1727, promptly sent in tribute. In the south too, the governors of Mottama and Dawei also sent tribute.

=== Farther Shan States (1758–1759) ===
In 1758, Alaungpaya dispatched an expedition to the northern Shan and Tai states (present-day northern and eastern Kachin State, northern Shan State, and Xishuangbanna Dai Autonomous Prefecture) which had been annexed by the Qing since the mid-1730s. By early 1759, the Burmese had successfully reestablished their authority. A later Qing attempt to reconquer the region would lead to the Sino-Burmese War (1765–69).)

=== Cape Negrais (1759) ===
Alaungpaya then turned his attention to the East India Company (EIC) outpost at Cape Negrais at the southwestern tip of the Irrawaddy Delta. The British, concerned with the success of French-backed Hanthawaddy, had landed on the island back in 1753, constructing a fort there. During the war with Hanthawaddy, Alaungpaya offered to cede the island to the British in return for military help. However, the British turned down Alaungpaya's offer, as they claimed they could not spare any arms because they too were engaged in their own war against the French. In 1758, Alaungpaya got the news that the East India Company's agents had sold ammunition and arms (500 muskets) to Mon rebels. (Historian G. E. Harvey claims that the news was a fabrication of Alaungpaya's advisers and that the arms provided were five muskets, not 500.) On 6 October 1759, a 2,000-strong Konbaung battalion overran the fort, demolishing it as they withdrew.

== External wars ==
=== Manipur (1756, 1758) ===
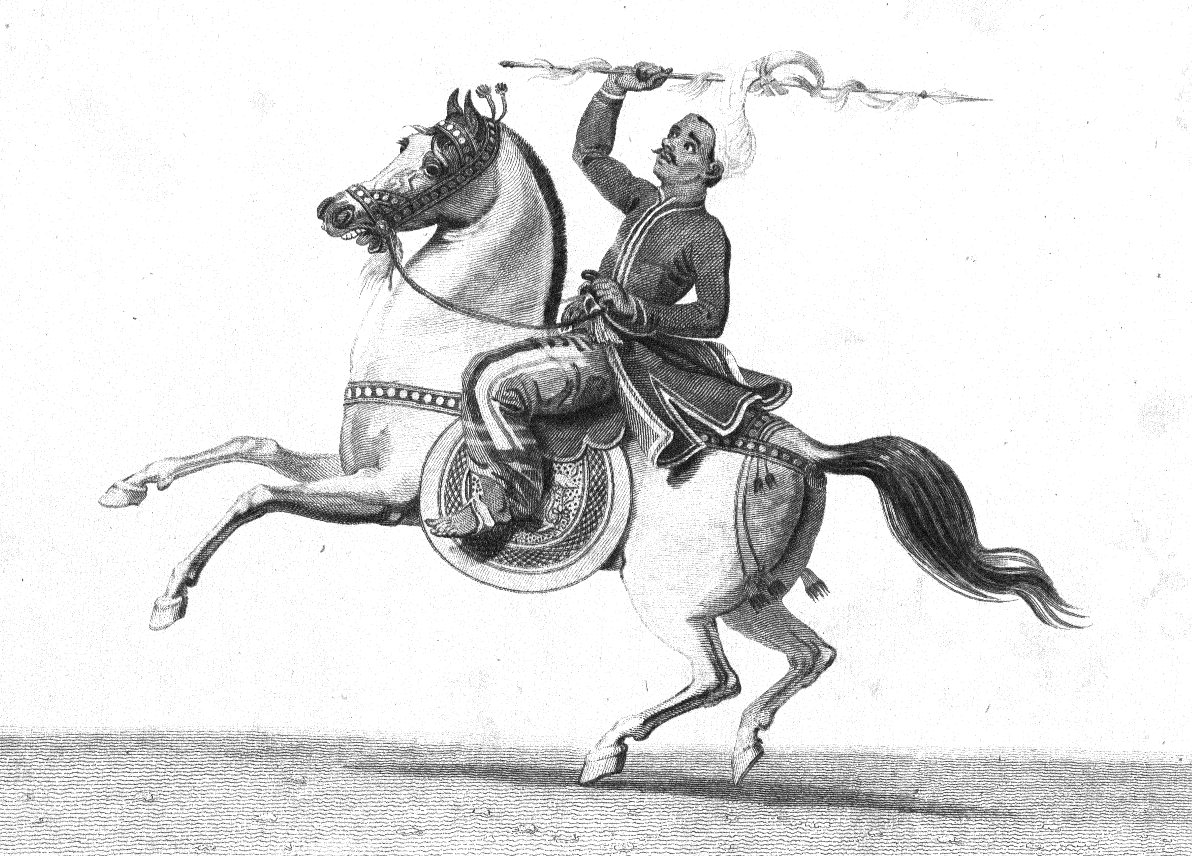
A Manipuri Cassay horseman in the service of Konbaung army

Alaungpaya, who grew up watching Manipuri raids ransacking his home region year after year, was determined to return the favor as soon as he was able. While most of his forces were laying siege to Syriam, he sent an expedition to Manipur to "instill respect". In early 1756, the Burmese army defeated the Manipuri army and ransacked the entire country, which the Manipuris call the First Devastation. After Lower Burma was defeated, Alaungpaya himself led another expedition in November 1758, this time to place the Burmese nominee to the Manipuri throne. His armies invaded by the Khumbat route in the Mainpur valley, and overcame fierce Manipuri resistance at Pallel, on their march to Imphal, the Manipuri capital. After Pallel, the Burmese entered Imphal without firing a shot. The Konbaung armies, according to the Manipuris, committed "unspeakably cruel" crimes against the populace, inflicting "one of the worst disasters in its history". But historian GE Harvey writes: Alaungpaya "was only doing unto them as they had done unto his people". Alaungpaya raised his nominee to the Manipuri throne and returned with his army. He also brought back many Manipuri cavalry, who became an elite cavalry corps in the Burmese army, known as the Cassay Horse. (This was the start of the Konbaung dynasty's long, draining involvement in Manipur. The small kingdom would prove a troublesome tributary, regularly putting up rebellions in 1764, 1768–1770, and 1775–1782. The Burmese involvement ceased after 1782 until they came back in 1814.)

=== Siam (1759–1760) ===
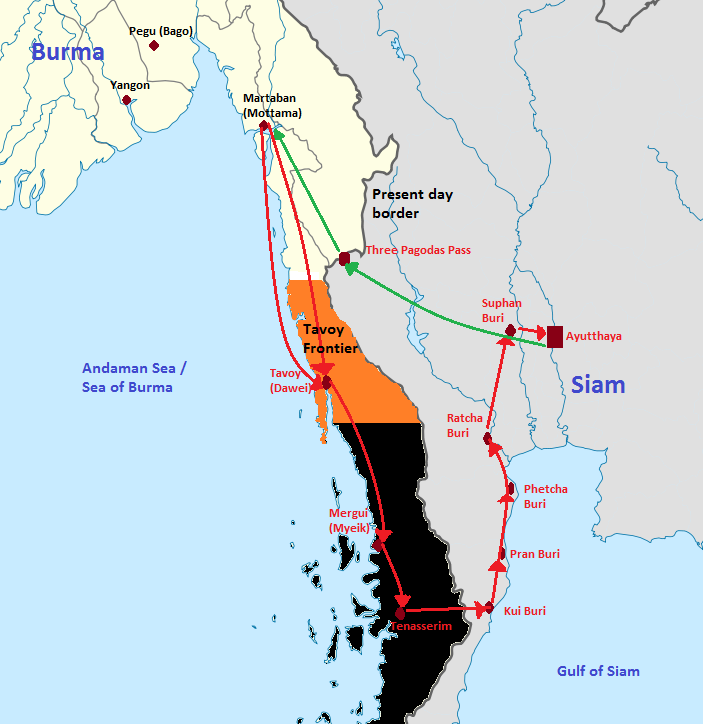
The main battle route in the Burmese-Siamese War

The Ayutthaya Kingdom was one of Southeast Asia's most wealthiest and most cosmopolitan polities in the 18th century. Prior to the Konbaung dynasty's rise, Ayutthaya Siam and Taungoo Burma had been relatively peaceful for over 150 years, with a brief period of hostilities when King Narai of Ayutthaya launched an ill-fated expedition to vassalize Burmese-aligned Lan Na in the mid 17th century. The Konbaung dynasty had harbored to seize Ayutthaya's wealth and resources for the benefit of its own rulers.

Siamese and Burmese interests in the Tenasserim have clashed on and off since the 16th century. Since the Burmese reconquest of Northern Tenasserim in the early 17th century, control of the economically lucreative Tenasserim coast was shared between Siam and Burma: Burma controlling the Northern Tenasserim ports of Mawlamyine and Tavoy while Siam controlled the Southern Tenasserim ports of Mergui and Tenasserim.

Ayutthaya's support of the Mon rebels against Upper Burma, particularly in the aftermath of the fall of Lower Burma encouraged Alaungpaya to attempt an all-out attack on Ayutthaya in order to end Ayutthaya as a formidable opponent against Alaungpaya's interests for internal security and in an attempt to recreate Bayinnaung's conquests.

==== Siege of Ayutthaya ====
After the rainy season of 1759, Alaungpaya and his armies returned to the south to deal with the still-unstable Lower Burma. One year back, a major Mon rebellion broke out, temporarily driving out the Konbaung governor of Pegu (Bago). Although the rebellion was put down, Mon resistance was still operating in the upper Tenasserim coast (present-day Mon State), where Konbaung control was still largely nominal. Siam provided shelter to the rebel leaders and their resistance troops. Alaungpaya sought assurances from the Siamese king that they would not intervene in the Burmese affairs and to surrender rebel leadership. But the Siamese king refused Burmese demands and prepared for war.

In December 1759, Alaungpaya's 40,000-strong Burmese army left Martaban to invade Siam via Tenasserim. His second son, Hsinbyushin was his deputy. The Burmese occupied the town of Tenasserim, moved eastward over the Tenasserim Hills to the shore of the Gulf of Siam, turned north and captured the coastal towns, Kuwi, Pran Buri, and Phetchaburi. Siamese resistance stiffened as the Burmese approached the capital of Ayutthaya, but nonetheless, they were driven back with heavy losses in men, guns, and ammunition.

The Burmese armies reached Ayutthaya in April 1760. Only five days into the siege, however, Alaungpaya suddenly fell ill. Thai sources say he was wounded by a cannon shell explosion while he was inspecting the cannon corps at the front, but Burmese sources state clearly that he fell ill, and given the inglorious nature of death by illness it is unlikely they were trying to hide the truth. His ailment has been stated as "dysentery" or "scrofula"

The Burmese began their retreat on 17 April 1760 (3rd waxing of Kason 1122 ME). Only Minkhaung Nawrahta's 6000 men and 500 Cassay cavalrymen remained as the rearguard, successfully fending off Siamese attacks along the route of retreat.

Although the Burmese did not achieve the ultimate objective of toppling Ayutthaya, they formally annexed the upper Tenasserim coast and shifted the border down the coast at least to the Dawei-Myeik corridor.

== Death ==
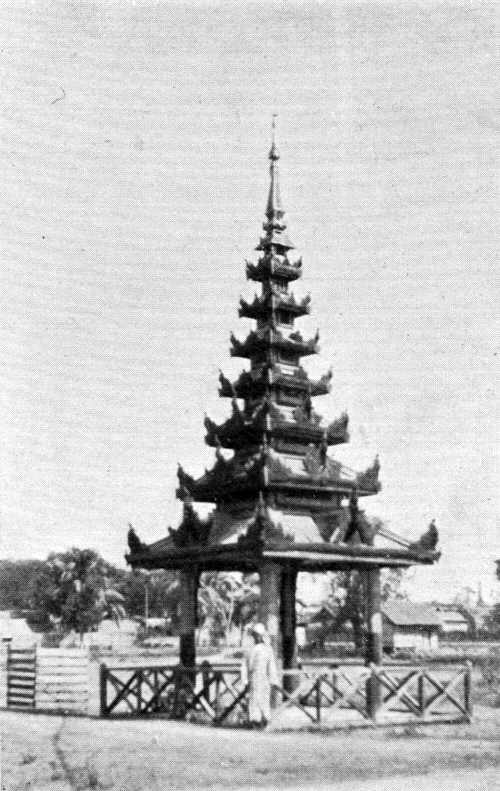
Alaungpaya's tomb in Shwebo.

Alaungpaya died on Sunday, 11 May 1760 (12th waning of Kason 1122 ME) at the dawn, at Kinywa, near Martaban, after being rushed back from the Siamese front by the advance guard. He had longed for the sights and sounds of home, Shwebo for one last time but it was not to be. His death was made public at Yangon, and his body was taken upstream on a state barge. At Kyaukmyaung landing stage near Shwebo, the whole court came out to meet it, and bore it solemnly through the Hlaingtha Gate of Shwebo. He was buried with the ritual of the kings in the palace city, which once had been his lowly village, amid the mourning of an entire people. He had reigned only eight years, and was not yet 46 when he died. Historian Harvey writes that "men are remembered by the years they use, not by the years they last".

Alaungpaya was succeeded by his eldest son, Naungdawgyi, despite his second son Hsinbyushin's attempt to take over the throne.

== Administration ==
=== Government ===
Alaungpaya spent most of his reign in the military campaigns. For the administration of his newly acquired territories, he largely continued the policies of the Restored Taungoo kings—the most important aspect of which was to reduce the number of hereditary viceroyships. Aware that hereditary viceroyships were a constant cause of instability, the king appointed governors in most of his newly conquered territories throughout the Irrawaddy valley. By and large, he reappointed existing governors if they submitted to him without a fight. In fact, most ethnic Mon governors of the south retained their position. He appointed only three viceroys: one at the Seven Hill Districts (present-day Magway Region centered around Mindon), another at Taungoo and the other at Bago, and none of them was hereditary. He made the viceroyships only because of his special personal relationships with those men. (The viceroy of Taungoo was his younger brother, for example. After the death of the incumbents, the offices automatically became governorships.) In accordance with the Taungoo policy, he allowed hereditary viceroyships only in the peripheral regions like the Shan States and Lan Na. (Later Konbaung kings would gradually reduce the number of hereditary viceroyships even in the Shan States.)

One key policy change that Alaungpaya initiated, and followed by latter Konbaung kings, was the establishment of military colonies and civilian settlement in Lower Burma. This policy would prove instrumental in eclipsing the Mon civilization by the early 19th century.

=== Infrastructure ===
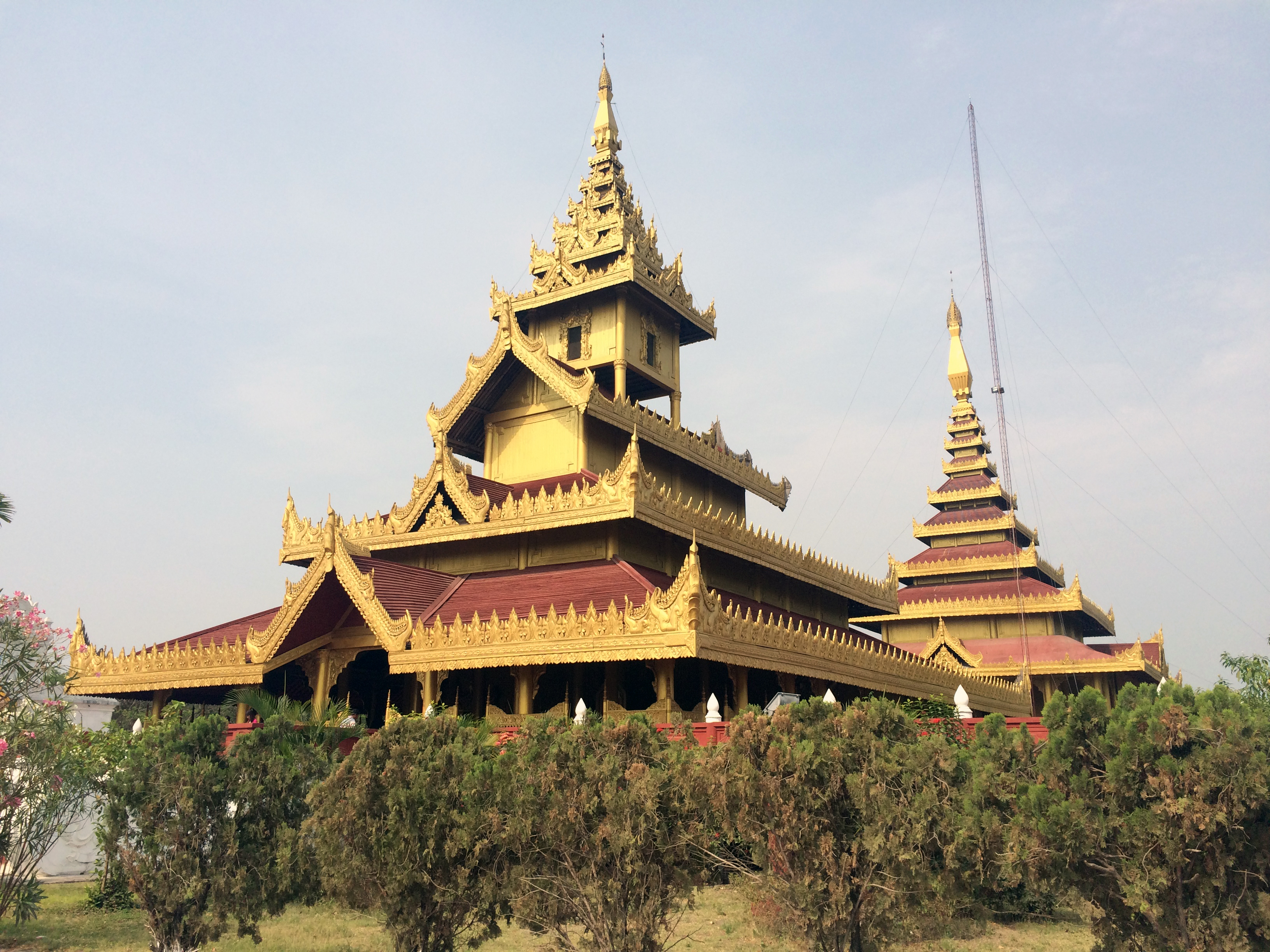
Shwebo Palace

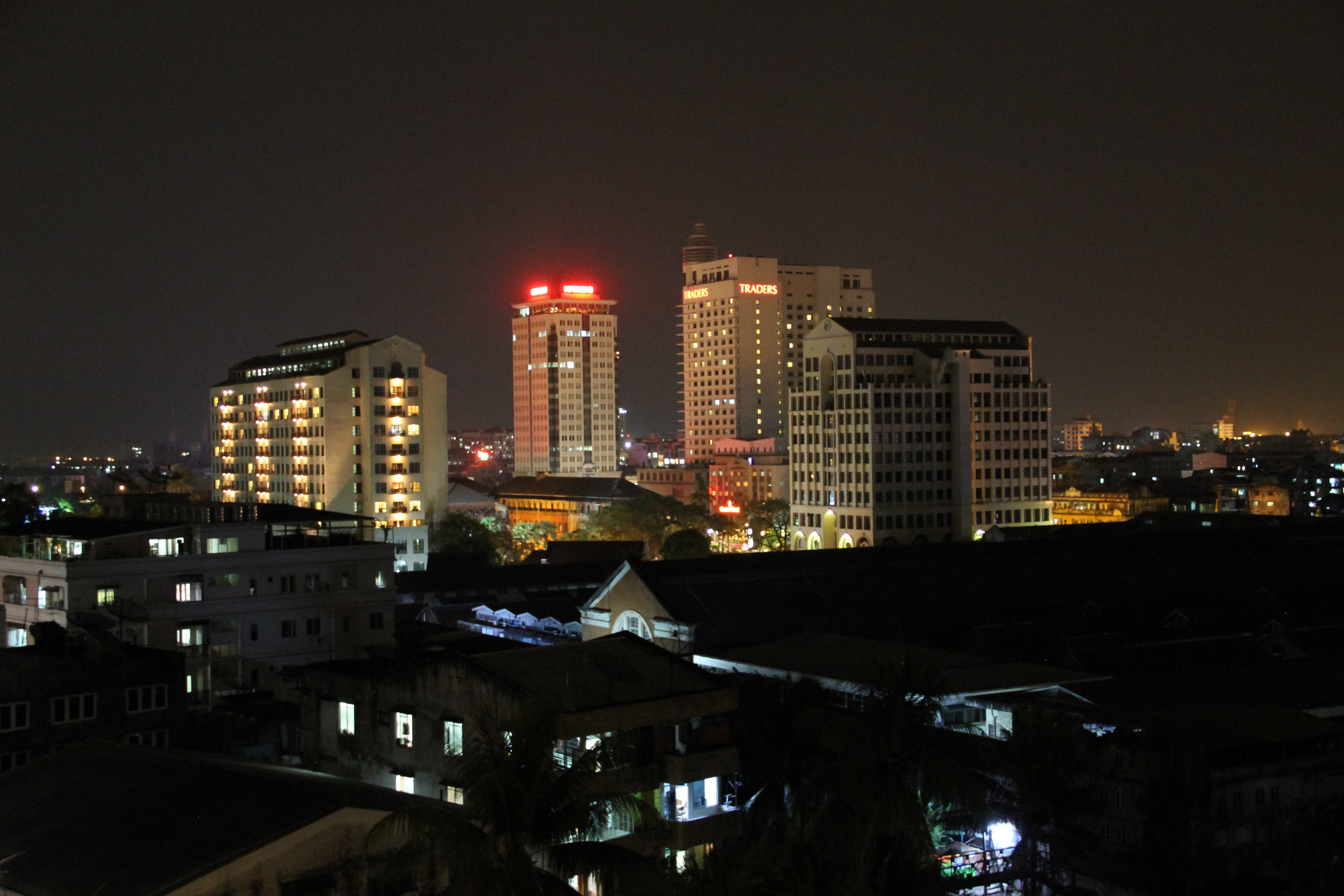
Yangon today

Most of the non-military work he commissioned came during a few brief hiatuses between campaigns. In 1752, he designated Shwebo as the capital of his kingdom and enlarged what once was a mid-size village into a sizable city. He built a palace on the model of those erected by the ancient kings. In 1758, he built the Mahananda Lake to supply Shwebo with water. He also built canals by damming the Mu river for agriculture but the work decayed after his death.

His most significant and enduring work was the founding of Yangon. After he conquered the pagoda town of Dagon in 1755, he added settlements with people from his home region. (The Mu-valley place names like Ahlon and Kyaukmyaung still endure to this date in Yangon.) (Note: According to the chronicle Alaungpaya Ayedawbon, Alaungpaya added military settlements surrounding the "old town of Dagon", and called the area Yangon. (Letwe Nawrahta, Twinthin 1961: 190–191): Alaungpaya captured Thanlyin-Kin (Yankin), a village outside Dagon on the 4th waxing of Kason 1117 ME (13 May 1755), and Dagon itself two days later on 15 May 1755. The following day, on 16 May 1755, he pronounced at the wooden fort constructed outside the "old town of Dagon" (ဒဂုံ မြို့ဟောင်း), and named the area Yangon. He proceeded to capture Tamwe on the 5th waning of Kason (29 May 1755), and added it to the forward perimeter of Yangon. The initial enlargements were primarily, if not solely, for military purposes. Per (Letwe Nawrahta, Twinthin 1961: 193–204), further enlargements (e.g., into Dawbon) ensued as part of the Battle of Syriam/Thanlyin (1755–1756) powered by a steady stream of military reinforcements from Upper Burma during the 14-month siege of Thanlyin. Even after the final defeat of Restored Hanthawaddy in May 1757, the military settlements surrounding Dagon remained; Yangon remained a garrison town. (Letwe Nawrahta, Twinthin 1961: 222): The town's first mayor Ne Myo Nawrahta was a general, appointed on the 2nd waning of Waso 1119 ME (2 July 1757). In all, what began as military settlements became permanent. (Lieberman 2003: 205): The Konbaung court encouraged "military colonies and civilian resettlement" using manpower from Upper Burma throughout Lower Burma in the following years. Although the region surrounding the original Dagon is now known as Yangon, the original Dagon is still known as Dagon to date.) By the eve of the First Anglo-Burmese War, Yangon had replaced Syriam (Thanlyin) as the chief port city of the kingdom.

=== Judiciary ===
For the land of the law, in 1755 he commissioned the Manu Kye dhammathat (lit. Manu Kye Law Book), a compilation of existing laws and customs, and of the rulings preserved in previous law books. Although the law book was poorly arranged and offered little explanations on contradictory passages, it attained enormous popularity, owing to its encyclopedic nature and to its being written in simple Burmese with little Pali.

=== Leadership style ===
Alaungpaya was a charismatic military "leader of the first quality" who deeply inspired his people to do greater things. He was lavish in his praise and rewards but also merciless in failure. According to GE Harvey, "men felt that when he led them they could not fail", and "to be named at one of his investitures was the ambition of men's lives."

== Legacy ==
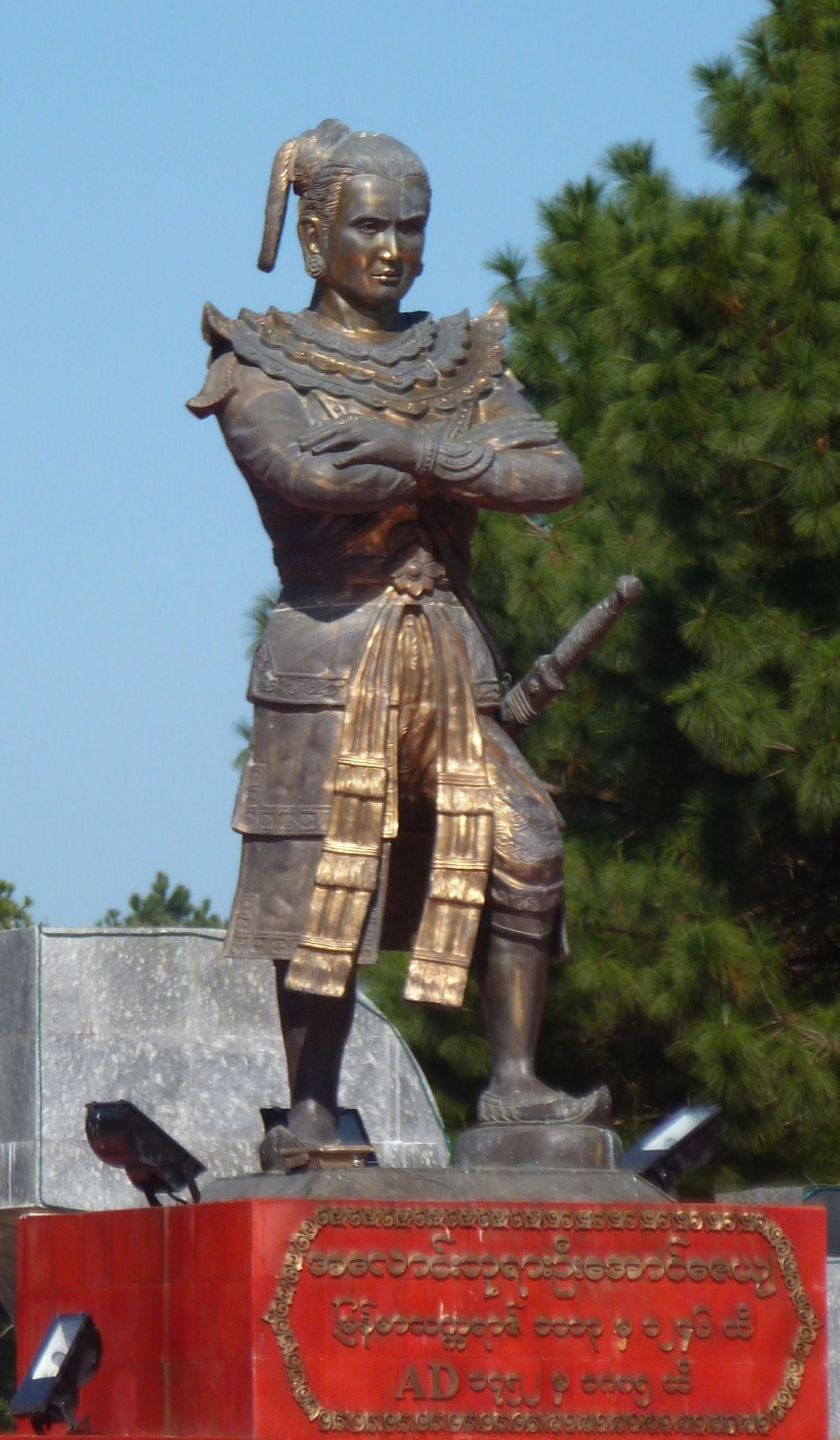
Statue of Alaungpaya in front of the DSA

=== Rise of Konbaung Dynasty ===
The most important legacy of Alaungpaya was the restoration of central rule in Burma for the first time in four decades, and the rise of the Konbaung Dynasty. Alaungpaya, according to the Burmese historian Htin Aung, led a people "divided and broken, humiliated and ashamed" and "left to his successors a people united and confident, holding up their heads again in pride and in glory". But Htin Aung also cautions that Alaungpaya "had led his people in waging war but his leadership was still sorely needed to wage a peace. He had roused his people to the fever heat of nationalism but he was denied the time and the opportunity to calm them down to tolerance and restraint". Indeed, overconfident Konbaung kings that followed him would go to war with all the neighbors in the next seven decades on their way to founding the second-largest Burmese empire, until they were defeated by the British in present-day northeastern India.

=== Charges of Bamar nationalism ===
Alaungpaya has also been named as the first king of Burma to consciously manipulate ethnic identity as a means to military and political domination. To date, Mon nationalists hold him accountable for the utter destruction of the Mon country, and the end of centuries-long Mon dominance of Lower Burma. According to one Mon nationalist historian, "the racial oppression practiced by Alaungpaya was worse than that of previous kings. He ended the cultural autonomy adopted by the Burmese rulers of the Pagan era, and by kings Tabinshwehti and Bayinnaung, and colonized the Mon state".

The charges need to be balanced with the fact that Alaungpaya was merely reacting to what historian Victor Lieberman calls "dismally self-defeating" policy of ethnic polarization of the Restored Hanthawaddy. It was the self-professed Mon kingdom that first attacked his homeland in 1752 and had begun persecutions and pogroms against Bamars in the south since 1740. The upstart southern kingdom had portrayed itself "as a quintessentially Mon kingdom, ordained by prophecy, wherein Mon language and cultural symbols would enjoy pride of place, and the Burman north would become a tributary". About 8,000 Bamars were massacred in 1740 alone. After executing scores of Avan captives in 1754, the Hanthawaddy leadership obliged all Bamars to wear an earring with the stamp of the Bago heir-apparent and to cut their hair in Mon fashion as a sign of loyalty to the southern kingdom. Moreover, while Alaungpaya was merciless in his sacks of Thanlyin and Bago where the moats "ran red with gore", elsewhere he reappointed Mon governors who submitted.

In all, Alaungpaya's rule of Lower Burma lasted less than two years, most of which he spent elsewhere fighting. Indeed, it was the latter kings of Konbaung that increasingly suppressed Mon culture with each rebellion in 1762, 1774, 1783, 1792, and 1824–1826.

=== Commemorations ===
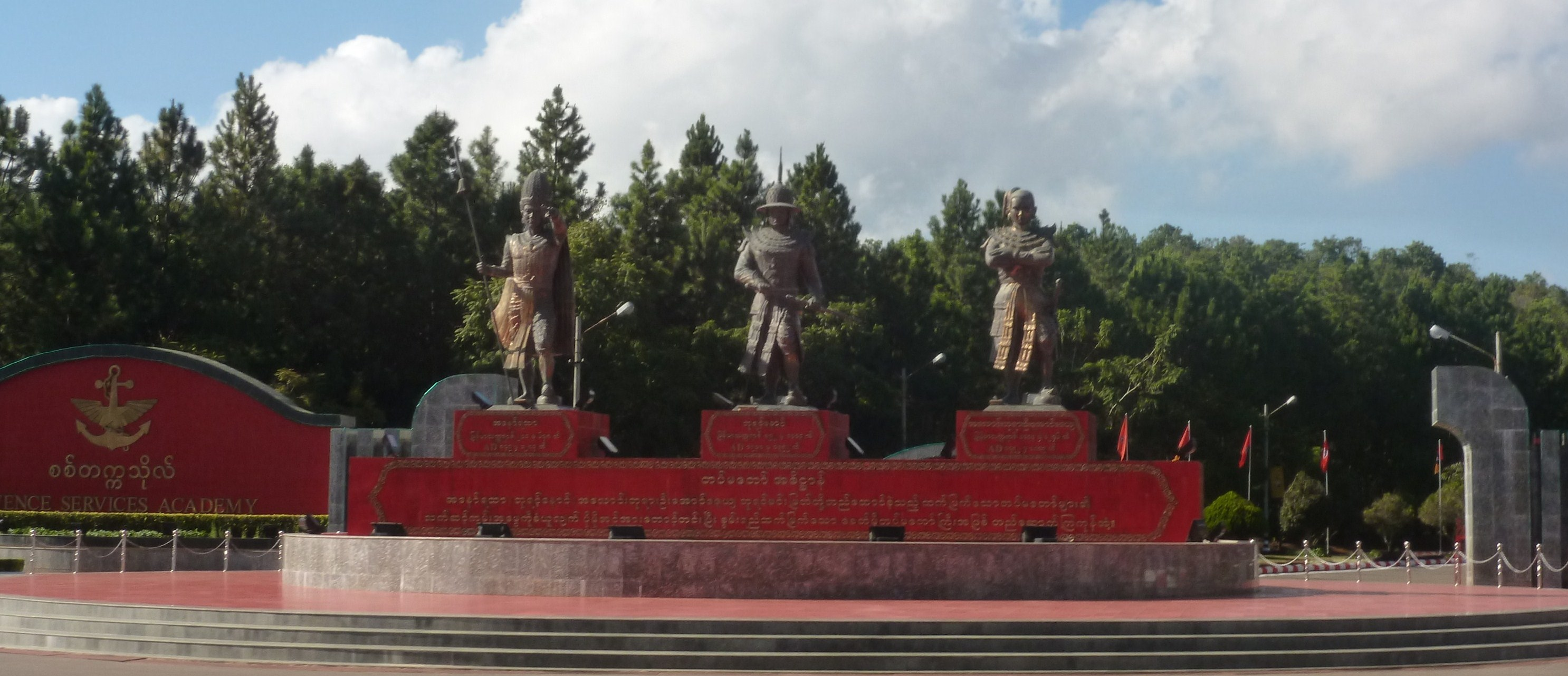
Statue of Alaungpaya (far right) along with the statues of Anawrahta (far left) and Bayinnaung (middle) in front of the DSA.

Alaungpaya, as the founder of the Third Burmese Empire, is considered one of the three greatest Burmese kings, alongside Anawrahta and Bayinnaung, the founders of the First and Second Burmese Empires, respectively. He is commemorated by:

- Team Alaungpaya, one of the five student teams in Burmese schools.
- A statue of Alaungpaya is one of three statues of kings that towers over Naypyidaw Square. The other two are statues of Anawrahta and Bayinnaung.
- A statue of Alaungpaya is one of three statues of kings in front of the Defence Services Academy. The other two are statues of Anawrahta and Bayinnaung.
- UMS Aung Zeya, Myanmar Navy frigate.
- Aung Zeya Bridge, a suspension bridge in Yangon.
- Aung Zeya Road, a road in Yangon.
- The Golden Letter of King Alaungpaya to King George II of Great Britain of 7 May 1756 was inscribed into the UNESCO Memory of the World register. It contains a proposal for trade between the two countries, with text engraved on a pure gold leaf, decorated with 24 rubies. It is the sole surviving golden letter from Burma.

== Family ==
=== Consorts ===
1. Me Yun San, Chief Queen
2. Shin Pyei
3. Shin Min Du
4. Thida Mahay
5. Shin Kla
6. Shin Shwe Kho Gyi
7. Shin Shwe Kho Gale

=== Sons ===
1. Naungdawgyi, 1734–1763
2. Hsinbyushin, 1736–1776
3. Amyint Mintha, 1743–1777
4. Bodawpaya, 1745–1819
5. Pakhan Mintha, 1749–1802
6. Sitha Mintha, 1753–1782
7. Pindale Mintha, 1754–1785
8. Myingun Mintha, d. 1804
9. Kodaw-gyi, died young
10. Myawaddy Mintha, d. 1792

=== Daughters ===
1. Khin Myat Hla, died young
2. Me Tha, Sri Maha Mangala Devi, Princess of Kanni, b. 1738
3. Me Myat Hla, 1745–1788
4. Me Sin, Princess of Bago, 1747–1767
5. Me Minkhaung, Princess of Pandaung
6. Min Shwe Hmya, Princess of Zindaw, b. 1754
7. Me Nyo Mya, Princess of Pin

== Bibliography ==
- Charney, Michael W. (2006). Powerful Learning: Buddhist Literati and the Throne in Burma's Last Dynasty, 1752–1885. Ann Arbor: University of Michigan.
- Hall, D.G.E. (1960). Burma (3rd ed.). Hutchinson University Library. ISBN 978-1-4067-3503-1.
- Harvey, G. E. (1925). History of Burma: From the Earliest Times to 10 March 1824. London: Frank Cass & Co. Ltd.
- Htin Aung, Maung (1967). A History of Burma. New York and London: Cambridge University Press.
- James, Helen (2004). "Burma–Siam Wars". In Ooi, Keat Gin (ed.). Southeast Asia: a historical encyclopedia, from Angkor Wat to East Timor, Volume 2. ABC-CLIO. ISBN 1-57607-770-5.
- Koenig, William J. (1990). "The Burmese Polity, 1752–1819: Politics, Administration, and Social Organization in the early Kon-baung Period", Michigan Papers on South and Southeast Asia, Number 34. Ann Arbor: University of Michigan.
- Kyaw Thet (1962). History of Union of Burma (in Burmese). Yangon: Yangon University Press.
- Letwe Nawrahta; Maha Sithu of Twinthin (1961) [c. 1770]. Hla Thamein (ed.). Alaungpaya Ayedawbon (in Burmese). Ministry of Culture, Union of Burma.
- Lieberman, Victor B. (1996), "Political Consolidation in Burma Under the Early Konbaung Dynasty, 1752-c. 1820.", Journal of Asia History, vol. 30, no. 2, pp. 152–168
- Lieberman, Victor B. (2003). Strange Parallels: Southeast Asia in Global Context, c. 800–1830, volume 1, Integration on the Mainland. Cambridge University Press. ISBN 978-0-521-80496-7.
- Maung Maung Tin, U (1905). Konbaung Hset Maha Yazawin (in Burmese). Vol. 1–3 (2004 ed.). Yangon: Department of Universities History Research, University of Yangon.
- Myint-U, Thant (2006). The River of Lost Footsteps—Histories of Burma. Farrar, Straus and Giroux. ISBN 978-0-374-16342-6.
- Phayre, Lt. Gen. Sir Arthur P. (1883). History of Burma (1967 ed.). London: Susil Gupta.
- Royal Historical Commission of Burma (1832). Hmannan Yazawin (in Burmese). Vol. 3 (2003 ed.). Yangon: Ministry of Information, Myanmar.
- South, Ashley (2003). Mon Nationalism and Civil War in Burma: the Golden Sheldrake. Psychology Press. ISBN 0-7007-1609-2.

Alaungpaya Konbaung Dynasty Born: 24 August 1714 Died: 11 May 1760
Regnal titles
Preceded by Mahadhammaraza Dipadi	King of Burma; 29 February 1752 – 11 May 1760	Succeeded by Naungdawgyi
