= Hsinbyushin =

Third Emperor of the Kongaung Dynasty of Burma from 1763 to 1776

Hsinbyushin Myedu Min ဆင်ဖြူရှင်
- Lord of the White Elephant, Prince of Myedu

King of Burma
- Reign: Monday, 9th Wanning of Nadaw 1125 - Monday, 10th Wanning of Nayon 1138; 28 November 1763 – 10 June 1776
- Coronation: Wednesday, 2nd Wanning of Nayon 1126; 16 May 1764
- Predecessor: Naungdawgyi
- Successor: Singu
- Born: Maung Ywa (မောင်ရွ); Sunday, 4th Wanning of Tawthalin, 1098; 12 September 1736; Moksobo
- Died: Monday, 10th Wanning of Nayon 1138; 10 June 1776 (aged 39); Ava (Inwa)
- Burial: Ava
- Consort: Me Hla; 15 queens in total
- Issue: 20 sons, 20 daughters including: Singu
Regnal name
- Sirisūriyadhamma Mahadhammarāja Rājadhipati (သီရိသူရိယဓမ္မ မဟာဓမ္မရာဇာ ရာဇာဓိပတိ)
- House: Konbaung
- Father: Alaungpaya
- Mother: Yun San
- Religion: Theravada Buddhism

Hsinbyushin (Burmese: ဆင်ဖြူရှင်, IPA: [sʰɪ̀ɰ̃ pʰjú ʃɪ̀ɰ̃], lit. 'Lord of the white elephant'; 12 September 1736 – 10 June 1776), also known as Maung Rwa (Burmese: မောင်ရွ ;Thai: พระเจ้ามังระ) or Prince of Myedu (မြေဒူးမင်း), was the third emperor of the Konbaung dynasty of Burma (Myanmar) from 1763 to 1776. The second son of the dynasty founder Alaungpaya is best known for his wars with Qing China and Siam, and is considered the most militaristic king of the dynasty. His successful defense against four Qing invasions preserved Burmese sovereignty. His 1765 invasion of Ayutthaya brought an end to the Ayutthaya Kingdom. The near simultaneous victories over Qing and Siam has been referred to as testimony "to a truly astonishing elan unmatched since Bayinnaung." He also raised the Shwedagon Pagoda to its current height in April 1775.

The deputy commander-in-chief during his father's reunification campaigns (1752–1759), Hsinbyushin as king pursued an expansionist policy against his neighbors. By 1767, his armies had put down a rebellion in Manipur, captured the Laotian states, sacked and destroyed Ayutthaya, and driven back two invasions by China. However, his reckless decision to wage two simultaneous wars against China and Siam nearly cost the kingdom its independence. The third Chinese invasion forced Hsinbyushin to hastily withdraw from Siam, until an uneasy truce in 1769.

The specter of war kept the state heavily militarized, setting the stage for army commanders to mistreat the population. In 1773, the army command provoked a rebellion by ethnic Mon troops, only to suppress the mutiny with "undue severity". The warlord behavior by local governors and army commanders only increased in 1774 when Hsinbyushin suffered from what turned out to be a long illness that would ultimately claim his life. In 1775, periphery vassals states of Lan Na and Manipur both revolted. He died in June 1776 while the Burmese forces were still engaged in Siam and Manipur. The Burmese armies withdrew from Siam right after his death, leaving Lan Na under Siamese control. His wars would eventually lead to the present-day Burmese control of the Taninthayi Region, the Northern and Eastern portions of Shan State, and Kachin State.

== Early life ==
The future king was born Maung Ywa (မောင်ရွ) to Aung Zeya and Yun San in Moksobo, a large village in the Mu river valley located about 60 miles northwest of Ava, on 12 September 1736. His father Aung Zeya was the chief of the village of a few hundred households, and was part of gentry families that had administered the Mu valley for generations. His father came from a large family, and was related by blood and by marriage to many other gentry families throughout the valley. Aung Zeya claimed descent from a 15th-century cavalry commander and ultimately the Pagan royal line.

Ywa grew up during the period in which the authority of King Mahadhammaraza Dipadi of the Toungoo dynasty had largely dissipated across the kingdom. The Manipuris had been raiding increasingly deeper parts of Upper Burma between the Chindwin River and Irrawaddy River since the mid-1720s. Ywa's home region was directly on the path of the raids, and took the brunt of the raids. With the Burmese court unable to deal with the small kingdom of Manipur, the Burmese watched helplessly as the raiders torched villages, ransacked pagodas, and taking away captives. In 1740, the Mon of Lower Burma broke away, and founded the Restored Hanthawaddy Kingdom. The central authority of the king had effectively disappeared, and a profound sense of helplessness pervaded and deepened. The Hanthawaddy armies finally toppled the Toungoo dynasty on 23 March 1752 when they captured Ava.

== Military commander (1752–1760) ==
Ava army in a 19th-century painting

On 29 February 1752, three weeks before the fall of Ava, Aung Zeya founded the Konbaung dynasty to resist the upcoming Hanthawaddy rule, styling himself King Alaungpaya. The Konbaung resistance was just one of many resistance forces that had sprung up across Upper Burma (mostly by panicked ethnic Burmans but also by ethnic Shans). Many young men from 46 villages in the Mu valley, who longed to redress the humiliations of the previous decades, answered Alaungpaya's call. The 15-year-old Ywa enthusiastically joined his father's call. (He would later prove to be the most militaristic of all Konbaung kings).

Ywa, now styled as Thado Minsaw, quickly proved a capable military commander—certainly, the most capable of Alaungpaya's sons, and became a top commander in his own right. By December 1753, the Konbaung forces had driven back Hanthawaddy invasion forces back to Ava, the fallen capital. The 17-year-old prince was given the overall command to recapture Ava. The prince's assault on 3 January 1754 succeeded, forcing Hanthawaddy troops to withdraw in disarray. Pleased, Alaungpaya made his second son the governor of Ava, (which had been totally sacked by the retreating Hanthawaddy forces).

Just three months later, the Hanthawaddy invasion forces were back, this time in their full might. Konbaung forces led by Hsinbyushin and his elder brother Naungdawgyi were badly defeated at present-day Myingyan District. Hsinbyushin fell back to Ava, and had to defend the city against a siege by the invaders. Hsinbyushin's defenses held. Other Hanthawaddy armies also advanced up to Mu valley, the Konbaung homeland, but were driven back. In April 1754, Hsinbyushin also broke the siege of Ava, and pursued the retreating Hanthawaddy armies down to Minbu. Alaungpaya granted Hsinbyushin the town of Myedu in fief, for the latter's successful defense of Ava. He would be known as the Prince of Myedu from then on.

Throughout the rest of the 1750s, Hsinbyushin was a key top commander in Alaungpaya's campaigns which by 1759 had reunited all of Burma (and Manipur), and driven out the French and the British Empire who had provided arms to Hanthawaddy. Hsinbyshin was second-in-command of the Burmese forces in Alaungpaya's invasion of Siam (1759–1760), which overran the Siamese defenses and reached the gates of Ayutthaya in April 1760. But the Burmese forces had to retreat hastily as Alaungpaya suddenly fell ill from scrofula. Hsinbyushin retreated back alongside his father's litter, and was by his father's bedside when the king died near a small village in Martaban (Mottama).

== Heir-apparent (1760–1763) ==
Alaungpaya was succeeded by his eldest son Naungdawgyi. Alaungpaya had pronounced that all of his six sons by his first wife would become king in the order of seniority. At Alaungpaya's deathbed, Hsinbyushin had promised his father to uphold his wish. But right after his father's death, Hsinbyushin made a blatant attempt to take over the throne, asking the top military command to support him. But he failed to receive sufficient support. Naungdawgyi forgave his brother at the queen mother's intercession because he needed to deal with an insurrection by Gen. Minkhaung Nawrahta, a highly decorated commander with whom Naungdawgyi had a long difficult relationship, and one who led the rearguard action in Siam, as well as a rebellion by his uncle, Thado Theinkhathu, the viceroy of Toungoo.

Hsinbyushin, now officially the heir-apparent per Alaungpaya's wish, watched his brother the king try to put down the rebellions, and offered no help. Naungdawgyi was able to put down the rebellions by January 1762, and even recaptured Lan Na in January 1763. By then Naungdawgyi's authority was unrivaled, and Hsinbyushin was prepared to stay as the heir-apparent for the long haul. Then in November 1763, Naungdawgyi, only 29, suddenly died. The ambitious Hsinbyushin, now 27 years old, ascended to the throne.

== Reign ==
On 28 November 1763, Hsinbyushin ascended to the throne. His full royal style at the coronation ceremony on 16 May 1764 was Thiri Thuriya Dhamma Razadhipati Hsinbyushin. He later assumed the new reign name of Thiri Thuriya Dhamma Mahadhammaraza Razadhipati (သီရိသူရိယဓမ္မမဟာဓမ္မရာဇရာဇဓိပတိ; Pali: Sirisūriyadhamma Mahadhammarāja Rājadhipati) on 3 January 1768.

=== Administration ===
Ava

The first order of business was to rebuild the ruined city of Ava, which he wished to make his capital. By the royal order issued on 27 November 1764, the relocation of the kingdom's capital to Ava from Sagaing was announced. The gates of restored Ava were named after the conquered states: on the east side, Chiang Mai, Martaban, Mogaung; on the south, Kaingma, Hanthawaddy, Myede, Onbaung (Thibaw); on the west, Gandalarit, Sandapuri (Viengchang), Kenghung; on the north, Tenasserim and Yodaya (Siam). He officially moved to Ava in April 1765, after his return from the Manipuri campaign.

=== Culture ===
In 1765, Hsinbyushin commissioned the translation of the Vyakarana, the Sanskrit works on grammar, medicine, astrology, erotic lore, etc. The Maungdaung Sayadaw translated with the help of nine Brahmin scholars Hsinbyushin had invited to his court from Varanasi, India. In 1771, an official at his court compiled a new law book called Manusara Shwe Min Dhammathat, based on older law books, in Burmese and Pali. In 1774, he raised the Shwedagon Pagoda to its present height, gilding it with his own weight in gold and erecting a golden spire studded with gems to replace the one thrown down during the 1769 earthquake.

Though mostly known for his wars, Hsinbyushin was deeply interested in poetry. One of his minor queens, Ma Htwe, was a noted poet. Letwe Thondara, a secretary to the Hluttaw council, whom Hsinbyushin had exiled to Meza Hill (in present-day Katha District), earned his recall two months later by writing the well known Meza Taung-Che poem, bewailing his grief and loneliness.

=== Military campaigns ===
==== Manipur (1764–1765) ====
Hsinbyushin was determined to renew the war against Siam, and began making preparations as soon as he became king. A year later, in November 1764, Hsinbyushin had two armies (one in Kengtung in Shan States, and the other in Martaban in the south) stationed, planning the invasion. While Hsinbyushin was busy preparing, Manipur, which had been a tributary state since 1758, revolted. Hsinbyushin did not recall his armies. In December 1764, the king himself led the expedition to Manipur. The Burmese army easily defeated the Manipuri army, taking Imphal. The raja of Manipur fled. Hsinbyushin brought back hundreds of Manipuris. The king and his armies arrived back to a newly rebuilt capital of Ava in April 1765.

==== Laotian states (1765) ====
As a first step toward a war with the Siamese, Hsinbyushin decided to secure the northern and eastern flanks of Siam. In January 1765, a 20,000-strong Burmese army led by Ne Myo Thihapate based in Chiang Mai invaded the Laotian states. The Kingdom of Vientiane agreed to become Burmese vassal without a fight. Luang Prabang resisted but Thihapate's forces easily captured the city in March 1765, giving the Burmese complete control of Siam's entire northern border.

==== Siam (1765–1767) ====
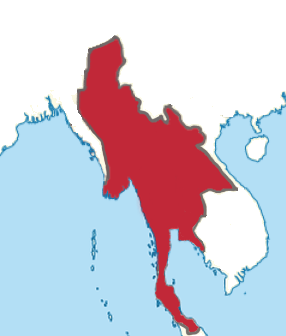
The territorial extent of the Burmese Empire in 1767

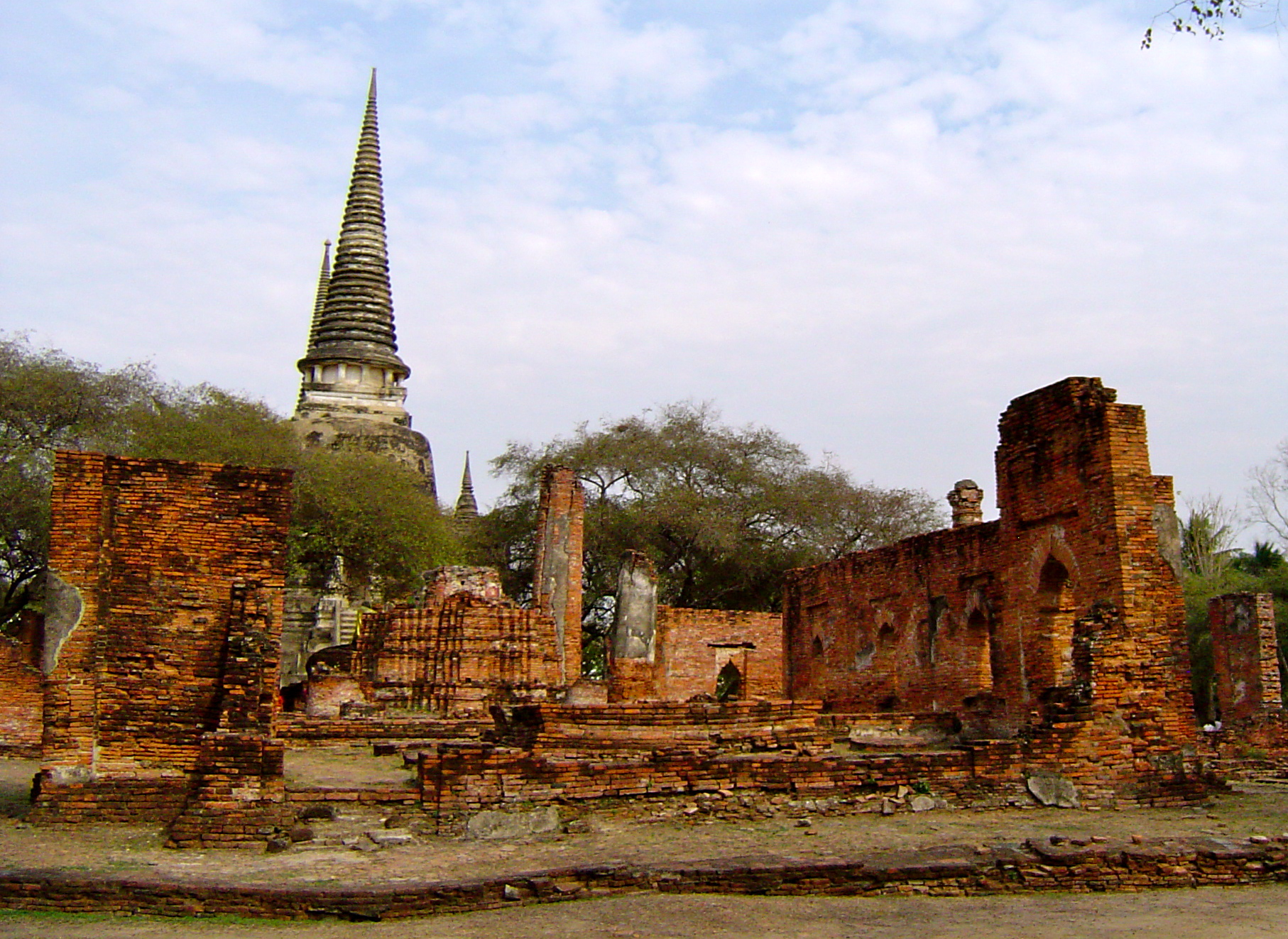
Ruins of Ayutthaya

The Ayutthaya Kingdom was one of Southeast Asia's most wealthiest and most cosmopolitan polities in the 18th century. Siamese and Burmese interests in the Tenasserim have clashed on and off since the 16th century. For the past 150 years, Burma controlled the Northern Tenasserim ports of Mawlamyine and Tavoy while Siam controlled the Southern Tenasserim ports of Mergui and Tenasserim. Since the Mon revolt of Lower Burma in the 1740s, Ayutthaya had been supporting the Mon rebels in fighting against Upper Burma and the Konbaung dynasts, even after the Konbaung conquest of Lower Burma in 1757. After a number of military incursions into Siam, Konbaung elites noticed that Ayutthaya's armies had not responded quickly to its own military movements on the border with Siam. The invasion of Ayutthaya was, in the words of Chris Baker and Pasuk Phongpaichit, a "joint-stock expedition", designed for the reward of riches of capturing the wealthiest port in Southeast Asia due to the seeming lack of a significant Siamese Army to be able to stop a significant invasion force.

After completing the conquest of Laotian states in 1765, Thihapate with his army returned to Lan Na. In the south, Maha Nawrahta's army had also been massing at Tavoy (Dawei), then the border town between Burma and Siam. Thihapate's northern army began the invasion via the Chao Phraya valley in August 1765 during the rainy season. In the middle of October 1765, towards the end of the rainy season, Maha Nawrahta's southern army joined in via Tenasserim for a two-pronged assault. With a policy of total war, Burmese armies captured and sacked most of Ayutthaya's major cities along the way, while most Siamese fled into the jungles. A large number of Siamese soldiers also joined the Burmese armies within Siam, in a time where loyalties were to tied to monarchs rather than to ethnicities.

The Burmese forces reached the outskirts of Ayutthaya on 20 January 1766. The Burmese then began what turned out to be a grueling 14-month siege. Burmese chronicles note that the inhabitants of Ayutthaya fought fiercely and bravely against the Burmese invaders. In January 1767, the city suffered a catastrophic fire, which burned 10,000 houses. The Burmese armies finally breached the city's defenses on 7 April 1767, and subsequently sacked and burned the entire city. Gold, cannons, treatises on science and religion, people, royals, musicians, and artisans were all hauled back to Ava.

Most of the Burmese armies marched back with its large war booty, with a small number of prize garrisons being left in a number of Siamese outposts and cities, including near the former Siamese capital. By late 1767, Hsinbyushin was forced to recall even more of his Siamese garrison units back to Ava to deal with the Chinese invasions.

A long-term effect of the sacking of Ayutthaya in Burma was the creation of the Yodia people, or the descendants of forcibly relocated Ayutthaya inhabitants to Burma. Ayutthayan musicians and artisans would hold significant roles within the Ava court and would significantly influence Burmese arts and culture. Generations of successive Ayutthaya nobles intermarried with Konbaung rulers and princes.

==== Chinese invasions (1765–1769) ====
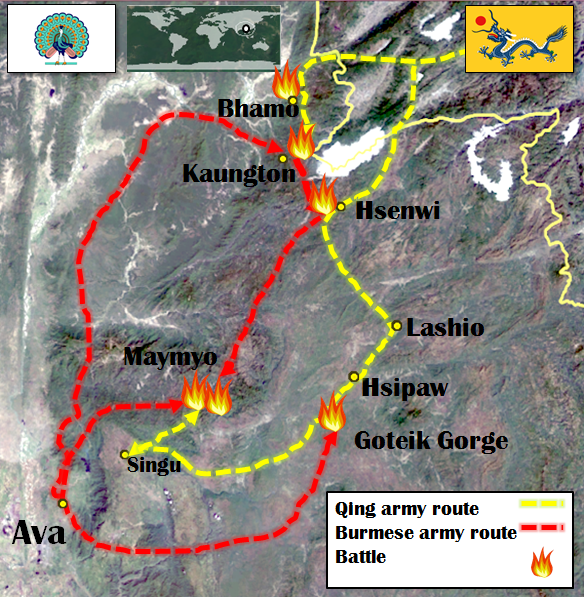
Main battle routes of the third invasion (1767–1768)

The conflict with the Chinese had its beginnings in the 1758–59 campaign by the Burmese to reassert Burmese authority in the Burmese-Chinese borderlands whose chiefs historically had paid tribute to both sides but had become solely Chinese tributaries since the mid-1730s. The Chinese at first decided to use local Tai-Shan militias to reassert their control but by 1765, the Qianlong Emperor decided to send in the regular Chinese troops. The Chinese began their invasion in December 1765, just as the Burmese armies were marching towards Ayutthaya. Hsinbyushin refused to recall the main Burmese armies in Siam. At first, the strategy seemed to work well. The remaining Burmese armies handily defeated the first two Chinese invasions at the border.

But the Burmese were caught flat-footed in November 1767, when a 50,000-strong force led by the elite Manchu Bannermen invaded again. The main Chinese army defeated the main Burmese army in December 1767 at the Battle of Goteik Gorge, prompting Hsinbyushin to finally recall his remaining garrison forces from Siam. The main Chinese army overran Burmese defenses and reached Singu, 30 miles north of Ava around late January 1768. Hsinbyushin to his credit never lost composure, and personally organized the defenses. Bolstered by the reinforcements returning from Siam, the Burmese forces defeated the main Chinese army in March 1768 at the Battle of Maymyo.

After the third invasions, both sides sent peace feelers but the Qianlong emperor ultimately made it clear that no compromise with the Burmese could be made. Ava now fully expected another major invasion. A Thai-Chinese nobleman, Phraya Tak, was in the process of reunifying Siam. Likewise, Manipur revolted yet again in mid-1768. But there was little they could do. The survival of their kingdom was now at stake.

When the next Chinese invasion came in October 1769, the Burmese were well prepared. They succeeded in containing the 60,000 strong invasion force at the border, and by early December had all the Chinese forces encircled inside the Kaungton-Shwenyaungbin corridor in northern Burma. The Chinese command asked for terms. The Burmese command, led by Gen. Maha Thiha Thura, were concerned that another defeat would merely stiffen the resolve of the Chinese government. Without Hsinbyushin's knowledge, they agreed to a truce, and allowed the Chinese to withdraw without their arms. The uneasy truce was not recognized by either side. Qianlong did not accept the agreement. Hsinbyushin was furious that his generals had acted without his knowledge, and tore up his copy of the treaty.

==== Manipur (1770) ====
Knowing that the king was angry, the Burmese armies were afraid to return to the capital. In January 1770, they marched to Manipur where a rebellion had begun, taking advantage of Burmese troubles with the Chinese. After a three days' battle near Langthabal, the Manipuris were defeated, and their raja fled to Assam. The Burmese raised their nominee to the throne, and returned. The king's anger had subsided; after all, they had won victories and preserved his throne. He exiled Maha Thiha Thura and generals for a month.

=== Post-Chinese war lull, deterioration of health and increasing army rule (1770–1774) ===
Following their last invasion, the Chinese kept a heavy military lineup in the border areas of Yunnan for about one decade in an attempt to wage another war while imposing a ban on inter-border trade for two decades. The Burmese were thus preoccupied with its Northern border for much of the next few years. Hsinbyushin did not resume the war with Siam, which had now been reinvigorated under a new leadership.

==== Mon rebellion (1773) ====
By 1773, Hsinbyushin had waited long enough, and he again contemplated renewing the war with Siam. He sent Ne Myo Thihapate to Chiang Mai with a sizable army, and asked the governor of Martaban to raise an army. However, he had to hold off the invasion because the southern army in Martaban mainly made up of ethnic Mon troops mutinied.

The cause of the mutiny was the repressive behavior by the Burmese army commanders, who according to the Burmese historian Htin Aung were "drunk with victory", and were acting like warlords over the local populace. They showed their arrogance even towards their ethnic Mon officers in the Burmese army, provoking them to rebel. The conflict began when Gamani Sanda, the governor of Martaban in charge of raising the army, had a disagreement with Binnya Sein, chief of the Mon officer corps. The governor ordered Binnya Sein's troops to the front, and when they left, he surrounded the families of Mon officers for money. When the Mon corps heard the news, they duly returned and mutinied. They drove back the ethnic Burmese troops back to Yangon.

The army eventually put down the mutiny that they provoked, with "undue severity". About 3000 officers and their families escaped to Siam. The rest of the populace could not leave, and took the brunt of the army's repression.

==== Deterioration of health and loss of authority (1774) ====
If Hsinbyushin was beginning to lose control of his commanders in the field, it only got worse in 1774. The king suffered from what turned out to be a debilitating long illness that would ultimately claim his life two years later. The illness is believed to be scrofula. (According to historian Helen James, his brother Naungdawgyi and possibly his father Alaungpaya died from the same disease.) The palace was full of rumors and intrigues about the succession. The army commanders, who were already acting like warlords even before the king's illness, were sure that the king would die soon, and now routinely ignored the king's orders to tone down their behavior, unimaginable only a few years back. The once self-assured king also became paranoid. He trusted only Pierre de Milard, the French commander in his service that he sometimes asked de Milard to sleep in the same room as him in order to protect him against possible attacks linked to a succession dispute.

So paranoid was he that in December 1774, he ordered the execution of the last Hanthawaddy king, Binnya Dala, who had been in captivity since May 1757 because the Mon rebels had tried to free the former king to put him on the throne. This was despite the fact that Hsinbyushin's father Alaungpaya had pardoned the former king's life.

In April 1775, he raised the Shwedagon Pagoda to its present height, gilding it with his own weight in gold and erecting a golden spire studded with gems to replace the one thrown down during the 1769 earthquake.

==== Lan Na rebellion (1774–1775) ====
The same arrogant repressive behavior by the local Burmese government caused a rebellion in Lan Na. The new Burmese governor at Chiang Mai, Thado Mindin, was disrespectful to local chiefs (saophas) and the people, and became extremely unpopular. The governor's harsh rule repulsed even Gen. Ne Myo Thihapate who was stationed there in 1773. The general was disgusted with the governor's behavior, and actually provided shelter to one of the chiefs, Kawila, being hunted down by the governor. After Thihapate's army was recalled, Kawila and other chiefs fled to the Siamese territory and raised a rebellion. Kawila and Siamese forces attacked Chiang Mai, and captured the city on 15 January 1775, ending the 200-year Burmese rule of Chiang Mai.

=== Resumption of warfare (1775–1776) ===
==== Siam (1775–1776) ====
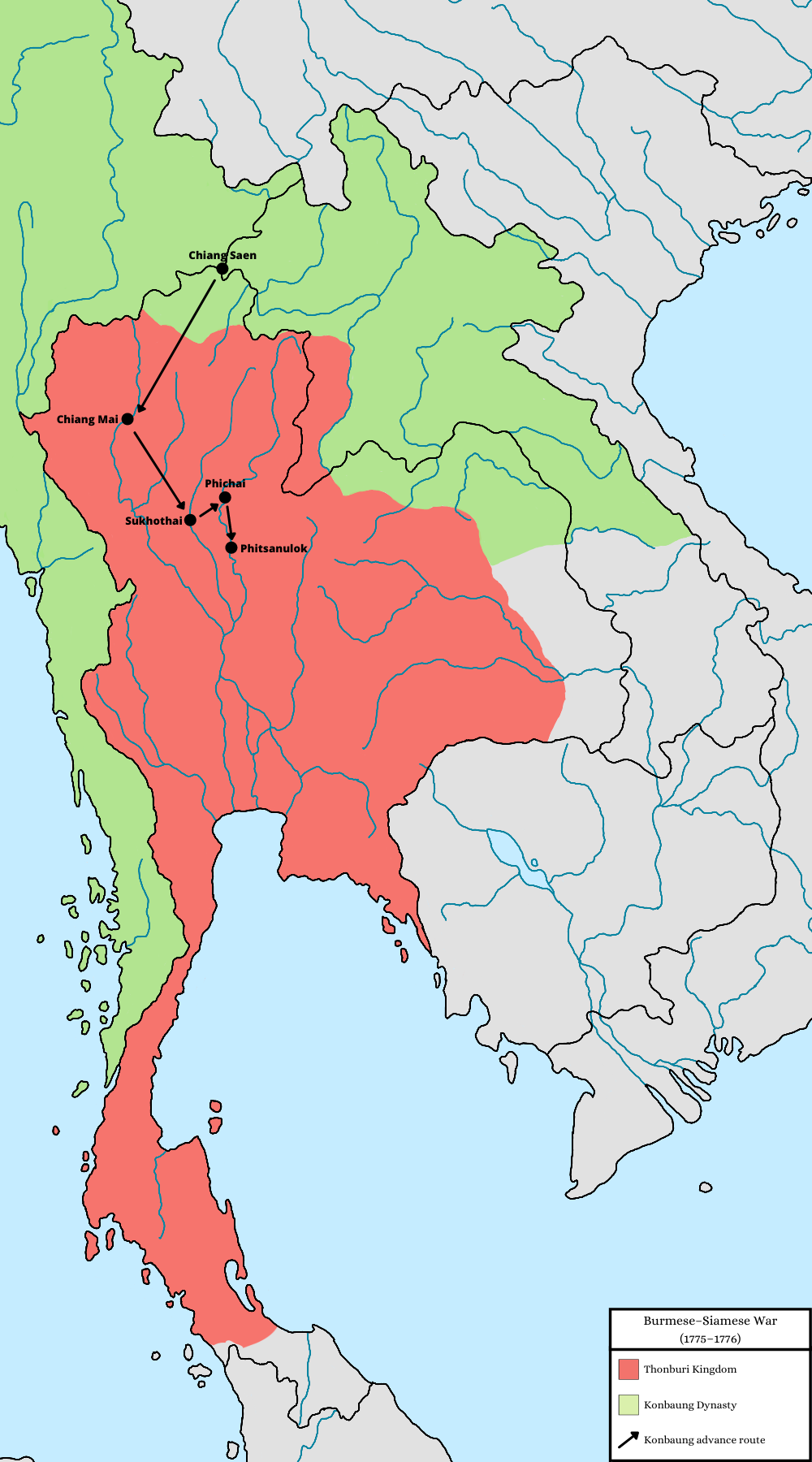
Movement of Ne Myo Thihapate's army during the Burmese-Siamese War (1775-1776)

Following the fall of Chiang Mai, Hshinbyushin was forced to respond. The king on his deathbed ordered a fresh invasion of Siam, appointing Maha Thiha Thura as head of the Siamese campaign. He still trusted the old general of the Chinese war fame because his eldest-son and heir-apparent Singu was married to the general's daughter. But the general faced a considerable difficulty in raising an army, especially in Lower Burma, which had just come off a major rebellion, and had to deal with the rampant insubordination in the Burmese high command. Adding to the turmoil, Manipur also revolted in 1775. The former king of Manipur who was driven out in 1770 by the Burmese, returned and overthrew the Burmese puppet ruler. Hsinbyushin, instead of focusing on the Siamese war, now diverted a portion of the army for a Manipuri expedition.

The Siamese invasion was held off until after the rainy season of 1775. A combined force of 35000 was raised for the Siamese theater. In November, Maha Thiha Thura's main army invaded by the southern route from Martaban, and Ne Myo Thihapate's army from Chiang Saen in northern Lan Na, (which was still under Burmese control). From the start, the invasion was fraught with multiple issues. First, the invasion force of 35000 was too small to be effective whereas the 1765 invasion force consisted of at least 50,000 troops. More importantly, the Burmese command was in disarray. With the king on his deathbed, insubordination became increasingly rampant. Indeed, the second-in-command of the southern army, Zeya Kyaw, disagreed with Maha Thiha Thura on the invasion route, withdrew with his troops, leaving Maha Thiha Thura with a portion of the troops. (This kind of insubordination would have been unimaginable only a couple years back when the king was in full control. Amazingly, Zeya Kyaw was never punished after the war.)

The remaining Burmese armies fought their way into Siam, facing fierce Siamese resistance along the way. Thihapate's army managed to capture Chiang Mai and Maha Thiha Thura's army fought its way down to Phitsanulok and Sukhothai provinces in central Siam, destroying the two cities similar to Ayutthaya in 1767. But the invasion force was unable to continue down the Chao Phraya Plain due to a food shortage.

Then, Hsinbyushin died on 10 June 1776 at age 39. Maha Thiha Thura decided to call off the invasion, and rushed back to Ava to ensure that his son-in-law Singu could ascend to the throne without incident. Ne Myo Thihapate also withdrew from Chiang Mai back to safer Chiang Saen. Had Hsinbyushin lived longer, it's possible that Maha Thiha Thura's army could have successfully marched down through central Siam and destroyed the new Siamese capital at Thonburi.

==== Manipur, Cachar, Jaintia (1775–1776) ====
At Manipur, the Burmese expedition force again managed to drive out the pesky Manipuri raja, who again fled into neighboring Cachar and Jaintia. This time, Hsinbyushin ordered the army to chase into these tiny kingdoms to capture the raja. Hsinbyushin died soon after. Even after the king's death, the Burmese continued to operate in Cachar and Jaintia. The raja of Cachar finally submitted but the Burmese still could not catch the Manipuri raja. The nominal suzerainty of Cachar and Jaintia came at a heavy price: the Burmese army had suffered heavy casualties.

== Epilogue ==
Hsinbyushin was only 39 when he died. He left 20 queens and 41 children.

Singu's right to succession was in direct conflict with Alaungpaya's edict that all of his sons become king in the order of seniority. Despite the fact that four of his brothers were still alive, Hsinbyushin had ignored his father's will, and made his eldest son Singu the heir apparent. With Maha Thiha Thura's backing, Singu ascended the throne without incident. The new king killed off potential rivals to the throne as soon as he came to power.

Yet Hsinbyushin's penchant for unmitigated warfare everywhere had a heavy cost to the kingdom. His reckless decision to wage simultaneous wars with Siam and China nearly cost the kingdom its independence, allowing Chinese armies to advance within 30 miles of Ava. He did learn from the mistake. With the Chinese keeping a heavy Chinese military lineup in the China-Burma border for about one decade to wage another war.

Moreover, although his armies achieved many battlefield victories, the victories were short-lived. The Burmese had little administrative control over the newly acquired territories. Likewise, his repeated wars in Manipur, Cachar and Jaintia produced only temporary "barren victories". The rule of Cachar and Jaintia was nominal. Manipuri rebellions continued after Hsinbyushin and Manipur would become independent in 1782. Moreover, the Burmese army penetrated deep into Siam again in 1775–1776 but could not defeat the new Thonburi regime. A long-lasting side-effect of Hsinbyushin's successful destruction of Ayutthaya was a resurgent and reinvigorated Siamese regime from Thonburi and Bangkok which would become a more ardent competitor to Burma than Ayutthaya, whose rivalry will continue for another 70 years until Burma's later destruction in the Anglo-Burmese Wars.

Another damaging, certainly more enduring, cost was the rise of warlord culture by the army commanders, especially after Hsinbyushin was struck down by illness. The indiscriminate rule of the army commanders and arrogant rule of governors pushed the people to the limit. The Mon rebellion in the south was ruthlessly put down; the rebellion in Chiang Mai succeeded. His constant warfare however left the kingdom utterly exhausted. People were weary of constant war, and were relieved when his son Singu did not pursue an aggressive warfare policy.

== Legacy ==
Hsinbyushin is one of the most famous kings in Burmese history, known for his victories over the Chinese and the Siamese. Historian Victor Lieberman writes: "These near simultaneous victories over Siam (1767) and China (1765–1769) testified to a truly astonishing elan unmatched since Bayinnaung." Historian Harvey writes that Alaungpaya's "tradition was not only maintained, it was eclipsed." The long-term legacy of the wars Hsinbyushin pursued comes in terms of a new militaristic Burmese aristocracy, the cultural and economic capital from sacking of Ayutthaya, the military resurgence of Siam, the territorial changes vis-a-vis China and Siam/Thailand, and modern Burmese-Thai relations.

=== Burmese militarism ===
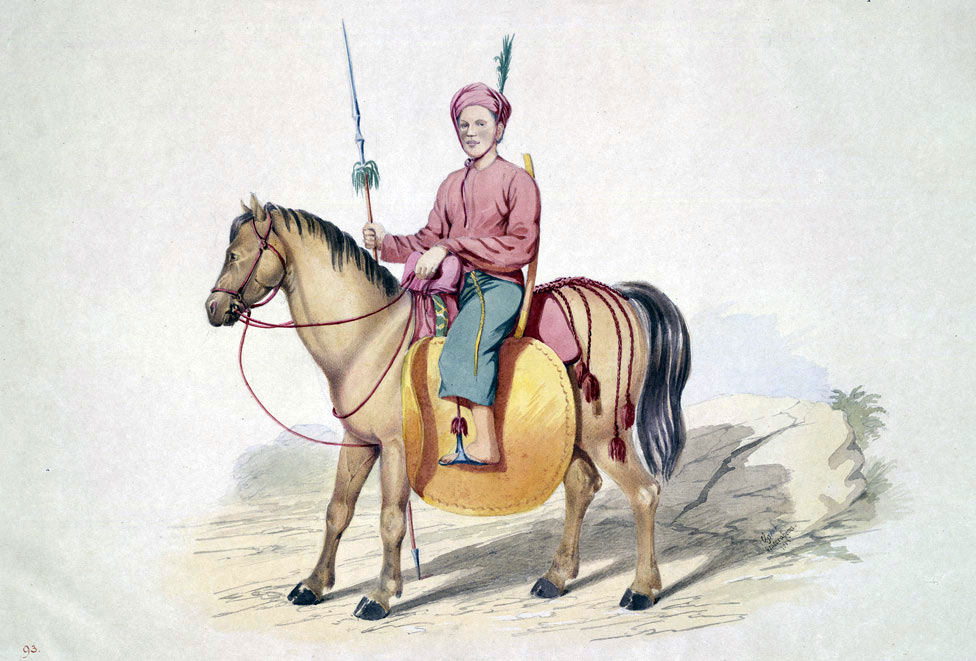
Manipuri horseman incorporated into the Burmese cavalry from its northwestern campaigns

A medium-term consequence of Hsinbyushin and his father's campaigns was the repeopling of Burma following the internal crisis of the 1740s and 1750s. His and his father's campaigns of endless warfare would also create a military aristocracy that would turn Burma into a great military kingdom, whose feats included the defense of Burma against the Qing Empire, the sacking of Ayutthaya.

The Konbaung dynasty would go on to continue its militarism by marching an army through the snowy Himalaya passes to conquer the Brahmaputra Valley and waging a near-successful offensive campaign in British Bengal that caused a panic within Calcutta, the capital of British Bengal. Despite the Burmese loss in that war, the First Anglo-Burmese War became the British East India Company's most costly war and led to the company's dissolution. The military campaigns of the Konbaung rulers would also bring in a plethora of new military units into the Konbaung army, including the incorporation of Manipuri cavalry in the 1820s.

=== Destruction of Ayutthaya ===
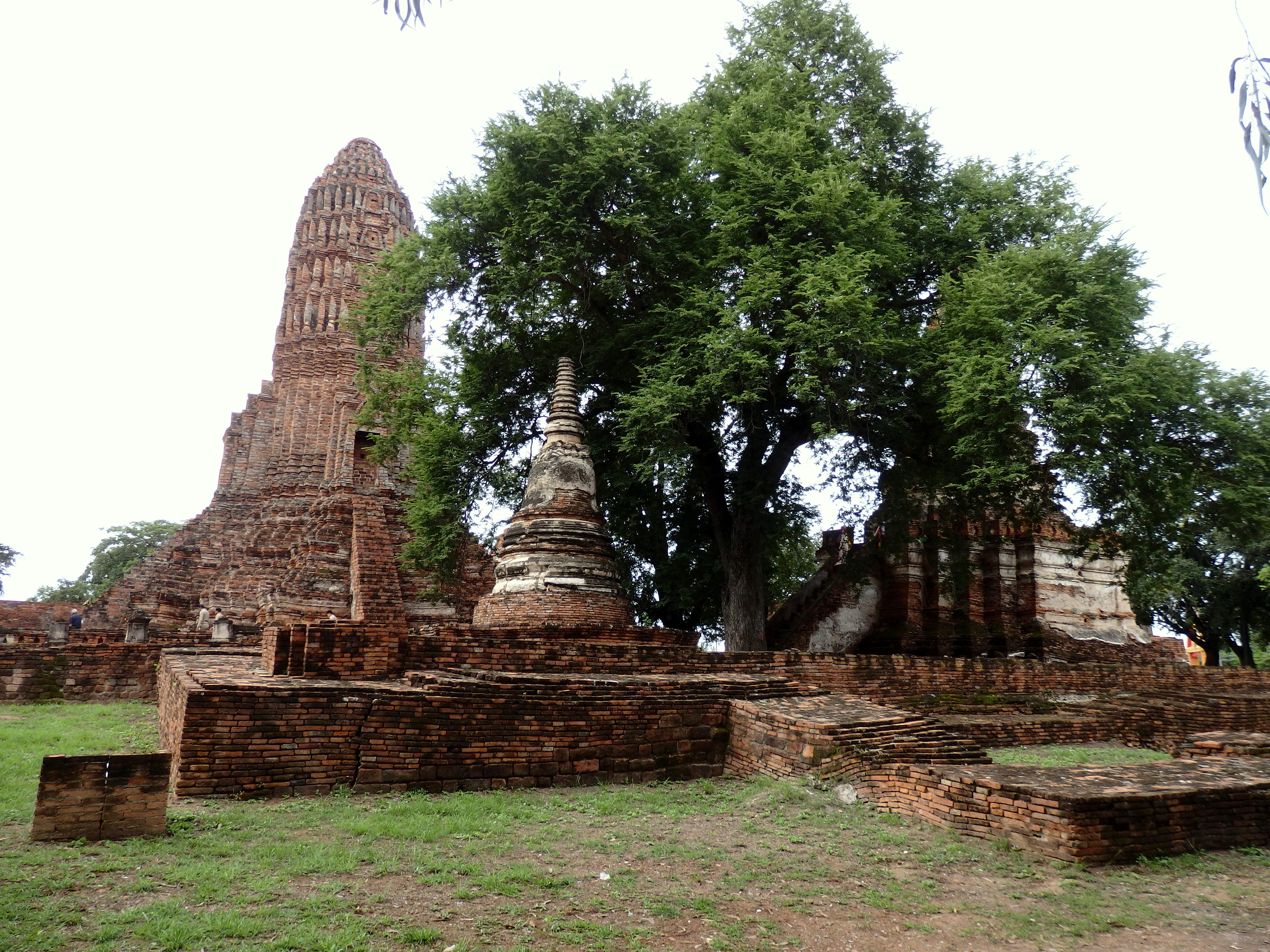
Ayutthaya, today

Hyshinbyushin's most long-lasting achievement was the destruction of Ayutthaya. The city, argued by Chris Baker and Pasuk Phongpaichit, was the most cosmopolitan city in Southeast Asia at the time. Hyshinbyushin's invasion of Ayutthaya resulted in the complete transfer of wealth from Ayutthaya to Ava, from which Hyshinbyushin was able to partake in a number of projects to commemorate his reign, such as the raising of the height of the Shwedagon Pagoda in 1775. The 50 year period of near-constant warfare between Burma and Siam (1759-1812) resulted in the depopulation of large areas of Siam, whereupon some Siamese provinces would remain deserted up to the 1870s. The descendants of Ayutthaya captives taken to Burma in 1767 are sometimes called the Yodaya people. On the other hand, his seizing of Ayutthaya artisans from the Siamese capital also resulted in the spread of the Siamese arts and culture into Burma, which would significantly influence Burmese culture. According to Baker and Phongpaichit, the Ayutthaya elite taken to Burma settled in well without conflict.

=== Resurgent Siam ===
At the same time however, Hsinbyushin's decision to sack and destroy Ayutthaya was a long-term strategic failure. While he was immensely successful in acquiring Ayutthaya's wealth and people and in destroying of the Ayutthaya polity, the sacking of Ayutthaya unified and reinvigorated many Siamese elites to pursue a militaristic trajectory that would expand Siam's orbit to its greatest military extent. The resurgent Siam proved to be a formidable competitor to Burma- eventually seizing Lan Na, Vientiane, and Luang Prabang from the Burmese orbit. The initial goal of the Ayutthaya conquest was to end Siamese support of Mon rebels in the Tenasserim coast and Lower Burma. Yet, the new Siamese elites continued to assist Mon rebels and by sending armies to the Tenasserim region for decades, up to the First Anglo-Burmese War, bringing many Mon refugees, both willingly and forcibly, to settle at the new Siamese capital at Bangkok. Furthermore, Burma lost its long-standing vassal Lan Na to the Siamese orbit. Its other recently gained tributaries, Vientiane and Luang Prabang, eventually entered the Siamese orbit only a few years after Hsinbyushin's death.

=== Present-day border ===
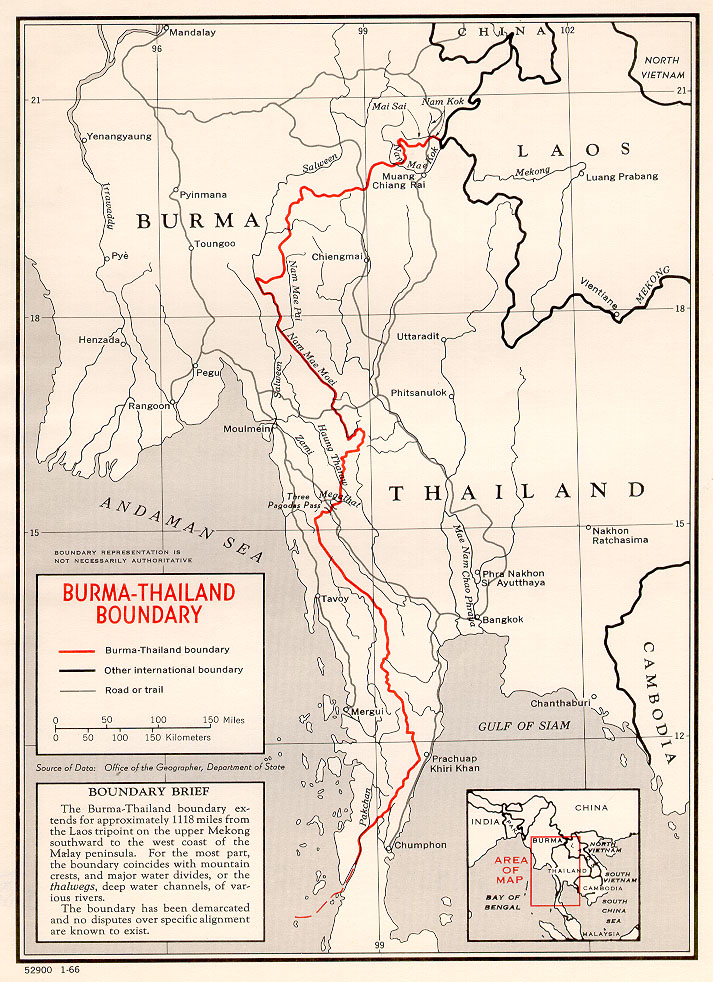
Map of the Myanmar-Thailand border

The Burmese success in the Sino-Burmese War laid the foundation for the present-day border between China, and Burma. A huge swath of territory from present-day Kachin State to northern and eastern Shan State remains part of Myanmar. The Burmese acquired Tenasserim as a result of the 1765 war, which Siam was unable to regain in later conflicts. Tenasserim had been divided between both Siam and Burma for about 150 years prior to Hsinbyushin's campaigns. The entirety of Tenasserim would remain in Burmese control until 1826, when it was acquired by Britain following the First Anglo-Burmese War before being cede it back 120 years later to an independent Burma.

=== Enmity in relations ===
The enduring enmity felt by Thais towards the Burmese began largely from Hsinbyushin's reign, in the light of the utter and senseless wanton destruction of the Siamese capital Ayutthaya in 1767. A Siamese chronicler wrote: "The king of Hanthawaddy (Bayinnaung) waged war like a monarch but the king of Ava (Hsinbyushin) like a robber." The Burmese invasion of Ayutthaya in 1767 was a conflict between kings, not of ethnicities. A number of Siamese joined the Burmese attack on Ayutthaya in 1767. Warfare of total destruction was normal of the time period, according to Thai historian Sunait Chutintaranond. Later Siamese armies of the Thonburi and Bangkok periods would inflict similar levels of destruction and atrocities as the Burmese in 1767, most notably the 1827 Sack of Vientiane during the Lao rebellion (1826–1828).

In December 1954, U Nu, the first prime minister of the Union of Burma, on his first state visit to Bangkok, publicly apologized for Burma's past misdeeds.

To this day, anti-Burmese feelings persist in the Thai world view. This enmity, at least among the Thai political leadership, manifested in the Thai "buffer zone" policy, which has provided shelter to, and at various times, actively encouraged and "sponsored" the several ethnic resistance groups along the border. The long-running ethnic rebellions by the Shan, the Mon, the Karen against the Burmese government would likely not be possible without the Thai government's active or passive support.

== Notes ==
Hsinbyushin Konbaung dynasty Born: 12 September 1736 Died: 10 June 1776
Regnal titles
| Preceded by Naungdawgyi | King of Burma; 28 November 1763 – 10 June 1776 | Succeeded by Singu |
Royal titles
| Preceded by Naungdawgyi | Heir to the Burmese Throne; 1760–1763 | Succeeded by Singu |
| Preceded by | Prince of Myedu; 1754–1763 | Succeeded by |
