= Sinkyun =

Village in Sagaing Region, Myanmar

Coordinates: 22°28′04″N 95°33′01″E

Sinkyun (Burmese: ဆင်ကျွန်း; also spelled Sin kyun, Shin Chun, or Taung Ywar Thit, or Sinkyun kyay ywar) is a village in the Tabayin Township, Sagaing Region in Myanmar. It is famous in ancient times of Myanmar Kings because many heroes were from the village. The villagers took part in the battles of King Alaungpaya to Thailand.They took part in building King Alaungpaya's Shwebo Palace at Shwebo. The palace was at the heart of an enormous walled city during its 18th-century heyday in Shwebo in Kon-Baung or Alaungpaya dynasty. The palace walls are now almost entirely gone but some parts of the wide moat are well-preserved. The most attractive part of the city is the section around 2 miles north of town near Maw Daw Myin Tha Paya, a pagoda built by Alaungpaya and guarded by giant chinthe.

On May 30, 2003, the Tabayin Massacre occurred near the Sinkyun village about 15 miles away; Aung San Suu Kyi escaped from the military junta's assassination attempt.

== Location ==
Sin Chun (Sin Kyun) Village is a village in Let Hloke Village Tract of Tabayin Township, Shwebo District, Sagaing Region, Myanmar. It lies between latitude 22.46545 and longitude 95.54896. Wun Si Village is located to the east of Sin Chun Village.

== Nature ==
Sinkyun Village is located in Tabayin Township, Sagaing Region, Upper Myanmar, Myanmar. The village is situated along the bank of Mu River. There are over 200 families in the village. There are two monasteries and one primary school. All of the villagers are farmers. A few people are fishermen. As it is located along the Mu River, the villagers can grow crops well. They usually grow all kinds of peas and beans, wheat, and various vegetables. Recently, most farmers are interested in banana and melon business because it makes them more profit.

== Gallery ==
Sinkyun village primary school

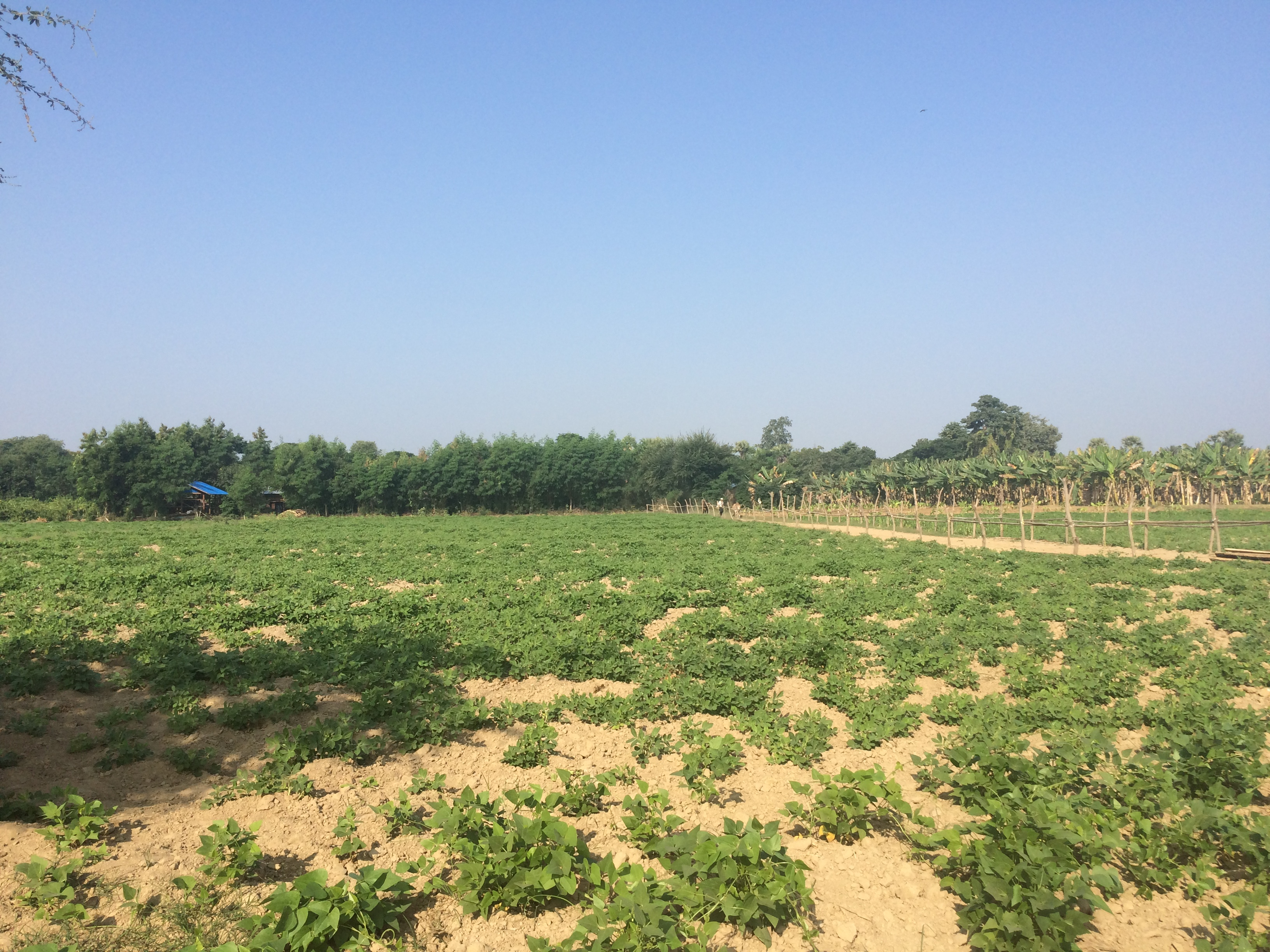
Agriculture in Sinkyun

Mu river beside the village
