= Let Hloke =

Village tract in Sagaing Region, Myanmar

Coordinates: 22°28′52.6″N 95°31′20.8″E

Let Hloke Village Tract is a Village Tract in Tabayin Township of Shwebo District, Sagaing Region, Myanmar.Let Hloke Village Tract is subdivided into 6 Villages include Let Hloke (South) Village, Nyaung Pin Thar (Kwet Thit) Village, Sinkyun (Sin Chun) Village, Thit Seint (Thit Seik) Village, Kan Thar Village, and Let Hloke (North) Village. It lies between latitude 22.48098 and longitude 95.52261.
