= Myo Daunt Pagoda =

Buddhist pagoda in Myanmar

Coordinates: 22°35′13.8″N 95°41′57.7″E

Myo Daung Pagoda
- မြို့ထောင့်စေတီ
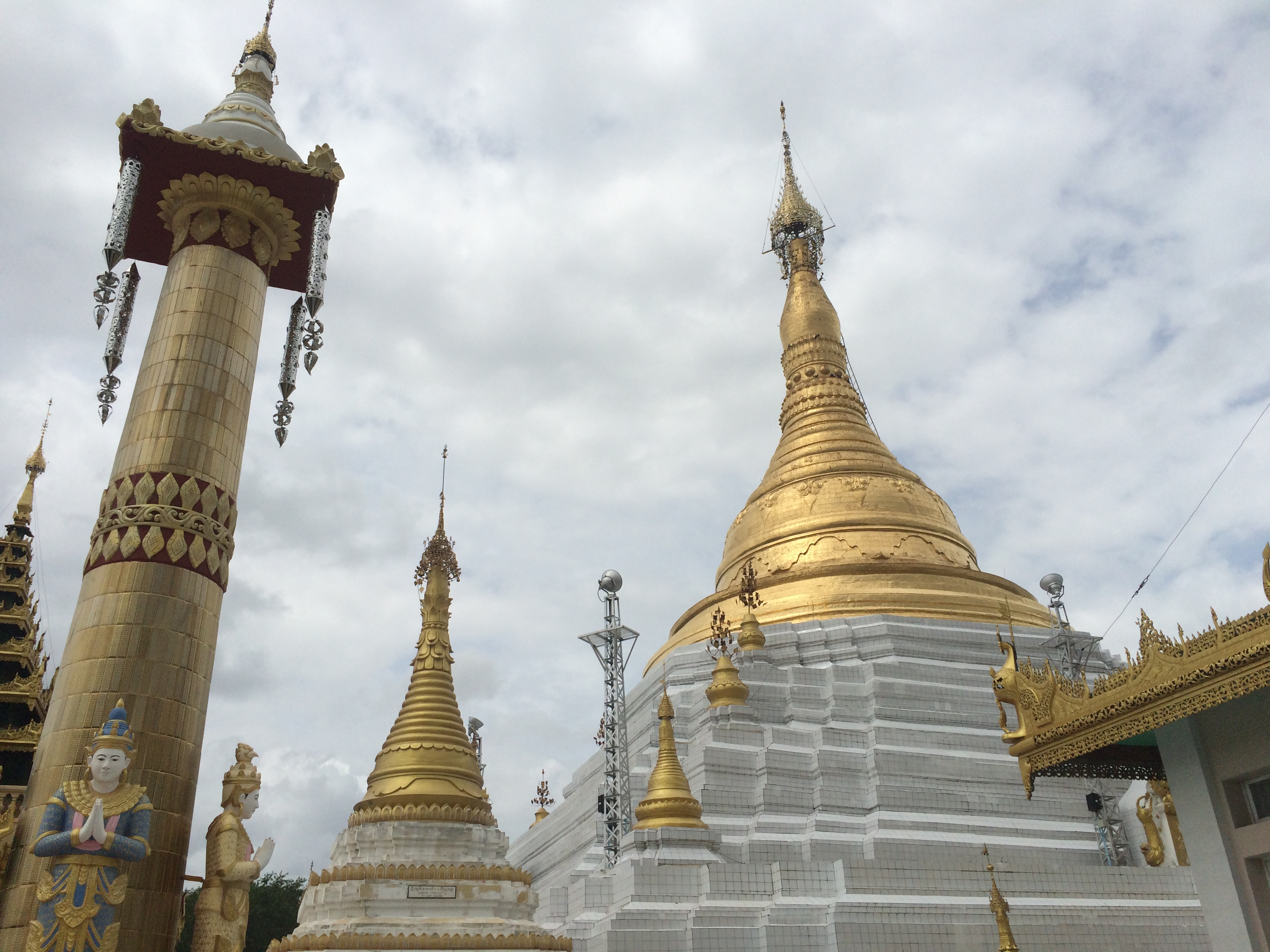
- Mawdaw Myintha "Myo Daung" Pagoda

- Location within Myanmar

Religion
- Affiliation: Theravada Buddhism

Location
- Location: Shwebo, Myanmar

Architecture
- Founder: Alaungpaya
- Completed: 1758

The Mawdaw Myintha Pagoda (Burmese: မော်ဓောမြင်သာစေတီ; commonly known as Myo Daung Pagoda or Myo Daunt Pagoda (မြို့ထောင့်စေတီ)) is a Buddhist pagoda located in Shwebo, Myanmar. Located five kilometers northeast of Shwebo, the structure is somewhat different from typical Burmese Stupa Architectural style, and was modeled after the Shwemawdaw Pagoda in Bago. It was founded by King Alaungpaya, who commissioned the construction of the pagoda after his conquest of the city in May 1757. Construction was completed in ten months.
