= Basic Education High School No. 3 Shwebo =

School in Sagaing Region, Myanmar

Coordinates: 22°34′05″N 95°41′35″E

Shwebo 3 High School အ.ထ.က. (၃) ရွှေဘို

Location
- Letwe Thondaya Street; Shwebo, Sagaing Region; Myanmar

Information
- Type: Public
- School number: 3
- Grades: 1-11

Basic Education High School No. 3 Shwebo (Burmese: အခြေခံပညာ အထက်တန်းကျောင်း အမှတ် (၃) ရွှေဘို; commonly known as Shwebo 3 High School) is a public high school located in Shwebo, Sagaing Region, Myanmar.
