= Konbaung dynasty =

Imperial dynasty of Burma (1752–1885)

Konbaung dynasty ကုန်းဘောင်မင်းဆက် (Burmese) konebhaung minsat
- 1752–1885
- Flag (Note: swallowtail with white field charged with a peacock biting a flower branch on a red disk in the centre of the field) Royal Seal (Note: The seal titled as "Seal of the State of Myanmar" stamped on the orders issued the king and the State)
- Royal anthem: စံရာတောင်ကျွန်းလုံးသူ့ (The Whole Southern Island Belongs To Him) (c. 1805–1885)
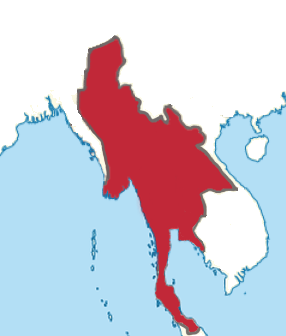
- Konbaung Dynasty in 1767

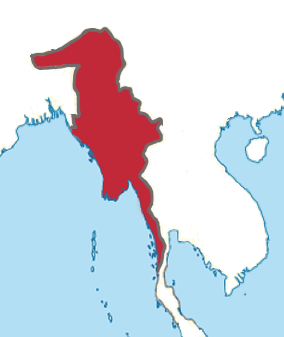
- Konbaung Dynasty in 1824
- Status: Empire
- Capital: Shwebo (1752–1760); Sagaing (1760–1765); Ava (1765–1783, 1821–1842); Amarapura (1783–1821, 1842–1857); Mandalay (1857–1885)
- Common languages: Burmese
- Religion: Theravada Buddhism (official)
- Demonym: Burmese
- Government: Absolute monarchy
- Monarch
  - 1752–1760 (first): Alaungpaya
  - 1763–1776: Hsinbyushin
  - 1782–1819: Bodawpaya
  - 1853–1878: Mindon Min
  - 1878–1885 (last): Thibaw Min
- Legislature: Hluttaw
- Historical era: Early modern period
  - Established: 29 February 1752
  - Konbaung–Hanthawaddy War: 1752–1757
  - Invasions of Siam: 1759–1812, 1849–1855
  - Qing invasions: 1765–1769
  - Conquest of Arakan: 1785
  - Anglo-Burmese Wars: 1824–1826, 1852, 1885
  - Annexed into British Raj: 29 November 1885

Area
- 1824: 794,000 km^{2} (307,000 sq mi)

Population
  - 1824: 3,000,000
- Currency: kyat (from 1852)
Preceded by
Toungoo dynasty
Restored Hanthawaddy Kingdom
Kingdom of Mrauk U
Ahom kingdom
Dimasa Kingdom
Lan Na
Ayutthaya Kingdom
Qing dynasty
Mughal Empire
Succeeded by
British Raj
Burma Province
Kingdom of Siam
Kingdom of Chiang Mai
Bengal Presidency
- Today part of: Myanmar; Thailand; India; Laos; China

The Konbaung dynasty (Burmese: ကုန်းဘောင်မင်းဆက်), also known as the Third Burmese Empire (တတိယမြန်မာနိုင်ငံတော်), was the last dynasty that ruled Burma from 1752 to 1885. It created the second-largest empire in Burmese history and continued the administrative reforms begun by the Toungoo dynasty, laying the foundations of the modern state of Burma. The reforms, however, proved insufficient to stem the advance of the British Empire, which defeated the Burmese in all three Anglo-Burmese Wars over a six-decade span (1824–1885) and ended the millennium-old Burmese monarchy in 1885.

Pretenders to the dynasty claim descent from Myat Phaya Lat, one of Thibaw's daughters.

An expansionist dynasty, the Konbaung kings waged campaigns against the Lushai Hills, Manipur, Assam, Arakan, the Mon kingdom of Pegu, Siam, and the Qing dynasty of China—thus establishing the Third Burmese Empire. Subject to later wars and treaties with the British, the modern state of Myanmar can trace its current borders to these events.

Throughout the Konbaung dynasty, the capital was relocated several times for religious, political, and strategic reasons.

== History ==
=== Establishment ===
The dynasty was founded by a village chief, who later became known as Alaungpaya, in 1752 to challenge the Restored Hanthawaddy Kingdom which had just toppled the Taungoo dynasty. By 1759, Alaungpaya's forces had reunited all of Burma (and Manipur) and driven out the French and the British who had provided arms to Hanthawaddy.

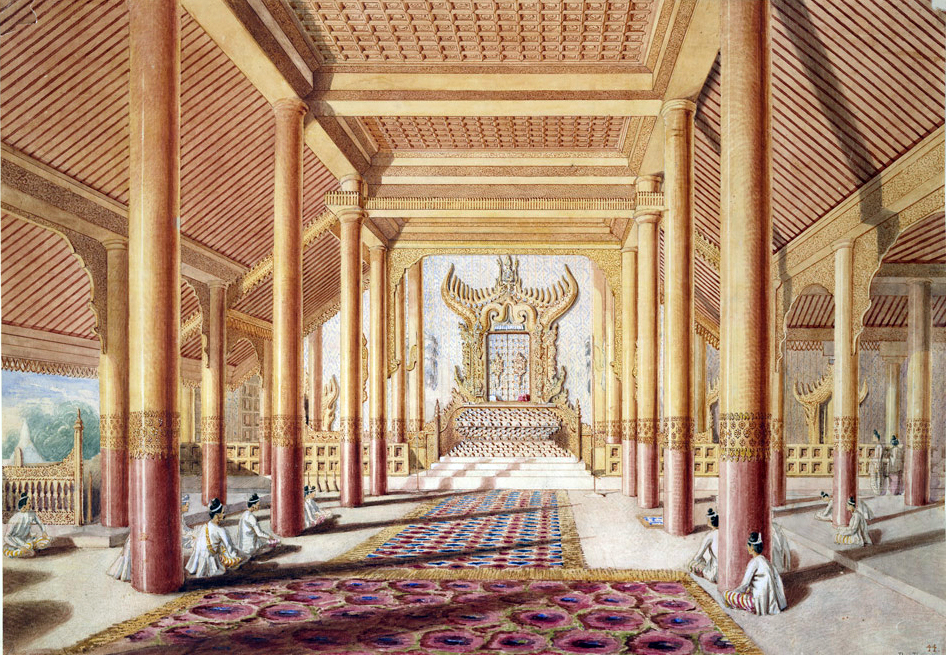
The Lion Throne of Burma in the throne hall of the Amarapura Palace (painting by Colesworthey Grant, 1855)

Alaungpaya's second son, Hsinbyushin, came to the throne after a short reign by his elder brother, Naungdawgyi (1760–1763). He continued his father's expansionist policy and finally took Ayutthaya in 1767, after seven years of fighting.

=== Relations with Siam ===
In 1760, Burma began a series of wars with Siam that would last well into the middle of the 19th century. By 1770, Alaungpaya's heirs had destroyed Ayutthaya (1765–1767), subdued much of Luang Phrabang and Vientiane (both 1765) and defeated four invasions by Qing China (1765–1769). With the Burmese preoccupied for another two decades by another impending invasion by the Chinese, Siam reunified by 1771, and went on to capture Lan Na by 1776. The Burmese made additional invasions to the newly reconstituted Siam in 1785 and 1786 but failed. Burma and Siam went to war until 1855 but after decades of war, the two countries exchanged Tenasserim (to Burma) and Lan Na (to Siam).

=== Relations with China ===
In the defence of its realm, the dynasty fought four wars successfully against the Qing dynasty of China, which saw the threat of the expansion of Burmese power in the East. In 1770, despite his victory over the Chinese armies, King Hsinbyushin sued for peace with China and concluded a treaty to maintain bilateral trade with the Middle Kingdom, which was very important for the dynasty at that time. The Qing dynasty then opened up its markets and restored trading with Burma in 1788 after reconciliation.

=== Relations with Vietnam ===
In 1823, Burmese emissaries led by George Gibson, who was the son of an English mercenary, arrived in the Vietnamese city of Saigon. The Burmese king Bagyidaw was very keen to conquer Siam and hoped Vietnam might be a useful ally. Vietnam had then just annexed Cambodia. The Vietnamese emperor was Minh Mạng, who had just taken the throne after the death of his father, Gia Long (the founder of the Nguyen dynasty). A commercial delegation from Vietnam has recently been in Burma, eager to expand the trade in birds nests (tổ yến). Bagyidaw's interest in sending a return mission, however, was to secure a military alliance.

=== Western expansion, First and Second Anglo-Burmese Wars ===
Faced with a powerful China and a resurgent Siam in the east, the Konbaung dynasty had ambitions to expand the Konbaung Empire westwards.

Bodawpaya acquired the western kingdoms of Arakan (1784), Manipur (1814), and Assam (1817), leading to a long, ill-defined border with British India. The Konbaung court had set its sights on potentially conquering British Bengal by the outbreak of the First Anglo-Burmese War.

Europeans began to set up trading posts in the Irrawaddy delta region during this period. Konbaung tried to maintain its independence by balancing between the French and the British. In the end, it failed, the British severed diplomatic relations in 1811, and the dynasty fought and lost three wars against the British Empire, culminating in the total annexation of Burma by the British.

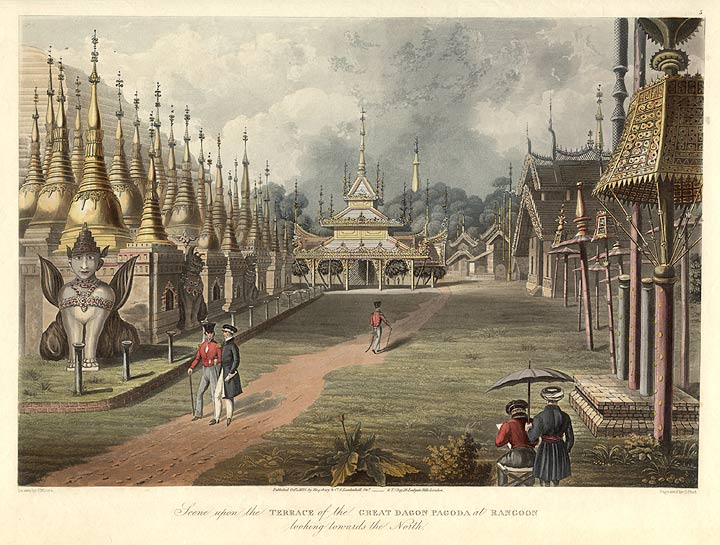
The Shwedagon Pagoda during the First Anglo-Burmese War (1824–26)

The British defeated the Burmese in the First Anglo-Burmese War (1824–1826) after huge losses on both sides, both in terms of manpower and financial assets. Burma had to cede Arakan, Manipur, Assam and Tenasserim, and pay a large indemnity of one million pounds.

In 1837, King Bagyidaw's brother, Tharrawaddy, seized the throne, put Bagyidaw under house arrest and executed the chief queen Me Nu and her brother. Tharrawaddy made no attempt to improve relations with Britain.

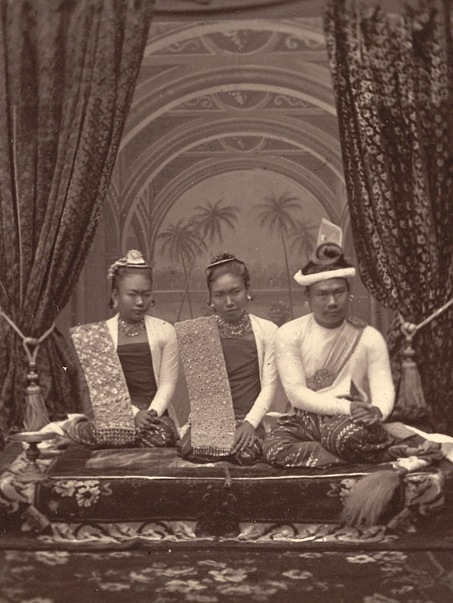
The last king, Thibaw Min (right), here with Queen Supayalat and her sister Junior Queen Supayalay, was forcibly deposed by the British following the Third Anglo-Burmese War in 1885.

His son Pagan, who became king in 1846, executed thousands—some sources say as many as 6,000—of his wealthier and more influential subjects on trumped-up charges. During his reign, relations with the British became increasingly strained. In 1852, the Second Anglo-Burmese War broke out. Pagan was succeeded by his younger brother, the progressive Mindon.

==== Reforms ====
Realising the need to modernise, the Konbaung rulers tried to enact various reforms with limited success. King Mindon with his able brother Crown Prince Kanaung established state-owned factories to produce modern weaponry and goods; in the end, these factories proved more costly than effective in staving off foreign invasion and conquest.

Konbaung kings extended the administrative reforms begun in the Restored Toungoo dynasty period (1599–1752), and achieved unprecedented levels of internal control and external expansion. They tightened control in the lowlands and reduced the hereditary privileges of Shan chiefs. They also instituted commercial reforms that increased government income and rendered it more predictable. The money economy continued to gain ground. In 1857, the crown inaugurated a full-fledged system of cash taxes and salaries, assisted by the country's first standardised silver coinage.

Mindon also tried to reduce the tax burden by lowering the heavy income tax and created a property tax, as well as duties on foreign exports. These policies had the reverse effect of increasing the tax burden, as the local elites used the opportunity to enact new taxes without lowering the old ones; they were able to do so as control from the centre was weak. In addition, the duties on foreign exports stifled the burgeoning trade and commerce.

Mindon attempted to bring Burma into greater contact with the outside world, and hosted the Fifth Great Buddhist Synod in 1872 at Mandalay, gaining the respect of the British and the admiration of his own people.

Mindon avoided annexation in 1875 by ceding the Karenni States.

Nonetheless, the extent and pace of reforms were uneven and ultimately proved insufficient to stem the advance of British colonialism.

=== Third Anglo-Burmese War and dethronement of the monarchy ===
He died before he could name a successor, and Thibaw, a lesser prince, was manoeuvred onto the throne by Hsinbyumashin, one of Mindon's queens, together with her daughter, Supayalat. (Rudyard Kipling mentions her as Thibaw's queen, and borrows her name, in his poem "Mandalay") The new King Thibaw proceeded, under Supayalat's direction, to massacre all likely contenders to the throne. This massacre was conducted by the queen.

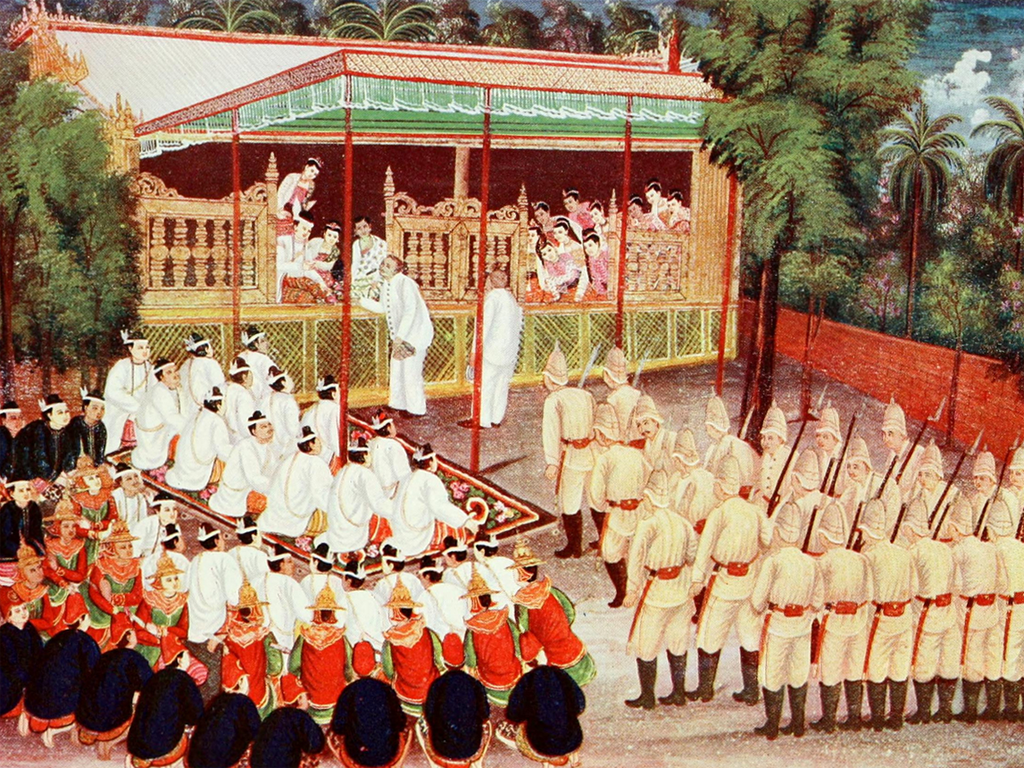
A traditional painting by Saya Chone depicts the abdication of King Thibaw.

The dynasty came to an end in 1885 with the forced abdication and exile of the king and the royal family to India. The British, alarmed by the consolidation of French Indochina, annexed the remainder of the country in the Third Anglo-Burmese War in 1885. The annexation was announced in the British parliament as a New Year gift to Queen Victoria on 1 January 1886.

Although the dynasty had conquered vast tracts of territory, its direct power was limited to its capital and the fertile plains of the Irrawaddy River valley. The Konbaung rulers enacted harsh levies and had a difficult time fighting internal rebellions. At various times, the Shan states paid tribute to the Konbaung dynasty, but unlike the Mon lands, they were never directly controlled by the Burmese.

== Government ==
The Konbaung dynasty was an absolute monarchy. As in the rest of Southeast Asia, the traditional concept of kingship aspired to the Chakravartin (Universal Monarchs) creating their own mandala or field of power within the Jambudipa universe, along with the possession of the white elephant which allowed them to assume the title Hsinbyushin or Hsinbyumyashin (Lord of the White Elephants), played a significant role in their endeavours. Of more earthly importance was the historical threat of periodic raids and aiding of internal rebellions as well as invasion and imposition of overlordship from the neighbouring kingdoms of the Mon, Tai Shans and Manipuris.

=== Administrative divisions ===
The kingdom was divided into provinces called myo (မြို့). These provinces were administered by Governors called Myosa (မြို့စား), who were members of the royal family or the highest-ranking officials of the Hluttaw. They collected revenue for the royal government, payable to the Royal Treasury in fixed instalments and retained whatever was left over. Each provinces was subdivided into towns and municipalities. Towns also called myo (မြို့), which were capitals of provinces. Towns were administered by Town Headman called Myo thugyi (မြို့သူကြီး) or Town administrator called Myo Ok (မြို့အုပ်). Municipalities called taik (တိုက်), which contained collections of villages called ywa (ရွာ). Municipalities were administered by Municipal Headman called Taik thugyi (တိုက်သူကြီး) and villages were administered by Village Headman called Ywa thugyi (ရွာသူကြီး).

The kingdom's peripheral coastal provinces, Arakan, Pegu, Martaban and Tavoy were administered by a Viceroy called a Myowun (မြို့ဝန်), who was appointed by the king and possessed civil, judicial, fiscal and military powers. Provincial councils (myoyon) consisted of myo saye (မြို့စာရေး) (town scribes), nakhandaw (နာခံတော်)(receivers of royal orders), sitke (စစ်ကဲ) (chiefs of war), htaunghmu (ထောင်မှူး) (jailer), ayatgaung (အရံခေါင်း) (head of the quarter), and dagahmu (တံခါးမှူး) (warden of the gates). The Viceroy of Pegu was assisted by several additional officials, including an akhunwun (အခွန်ဝန်) (revenue officer), akaukwun (အကောက်ဝန်) (customs collector), and a yewun (ရေဝန်) (conservator of port).

The outlying tributary fiefdoms on the edges of the kingdom were autonomous in practice and nominally administered by the king. These included the Shan, Palaung, Kachin and Manipuri principalities. The tributary princes of these fiefdoms regularly pledged allegiance and offered tribute to the Konbaung kings (through rituals called gadaw pwedaw) (ကန်တော့ပွဲ) and were accorded with royal privileges and designated sawbwa (စော်ဘွား) (from Shan saopha, 'lord of the sky') In particular, the families of Shan sawbwas regularly intermarried into Burmese aristocracy and had close contact with the Konbaung court.

=== Royal agencies ===
The government was centrally administered by several advisory royal agencies, following a pattern established during the Taungoo dynasty.

The Hluttaw (လွှတ်တော်, lit. "place of royal release," cf. Council of State) held legislative, ministerial and judicial functions, administering the royal government as delegated by the king. Sessions at the Hluttaw were held for six hours daily, from 6 to 9 a.m., and from noon to 3 p.m. Listed by rank, the Hluttaw was composed of:

- Head of the Council – the king, his heir apparent, or a high-ranking prince who presided over the Hluttaw as its nominal head.
- Wunshindaw (ဝန်ရှင်တော်, Prime Minister) – served as the Chief Minister of the Hluttaw, an office established during the reign of Mindon Min and most notably served by the Kinwun Mingyi U Kaung
- Four Wungyi (ဝန်ကြီး, Minister) – jointly administered the Hluttaw's administrative portfolio and shared joint responsibility for the kingdom's administration.
  - Four Wundauk (ဝန်ထောက်, Deputy Minister) – served as deputies to the Wungyi
- Myinzugyi Wun (မြင်းဇူးကြီးဝန်, lit. "Minister of the Cavalry Regiments") – as the highest regular army position, oversaw the Tatmadaw.
- Athi Wun (အသည်ဝန်, lit. "Minister of the Athi") – responsible for allocating corvée labour resources and mobilisation of taxpaying commoners, called athi, during wartime

The Byedaik (ဗြဲတိုက်, lit. "Bachelor Chambers," with Bye stemming from Mon blai (Mon: ဗ္ကဲာ, "bachelor") served as the Privy Council by handling the court's internal affairs and also served as an interlocutor between the king and other royal agencies. The Byedaik consisted of:

- Eight Atwinwun (အတွင်းဝန်, cf. 'Ministers of the Interior') – communicated business affairs of the Hluttaw to the king, administered internal transactions of general affairs relating to the royal court.
- Thandawzin (သံတော်ဆင့်, "Heralds") – performed secretarial duties and attended king's audiences to note king's orders and forward them to Hluttaw for inscription.
- Simihtunhmu (ဆီမီးထွန်းမှူး, lit. "Lamp Lighters") – kept a list of all persons sleeping in the palace
- Hteindeinyanhmu (ထိန်းသိမ်းရေးမှူး, "caretakers of royal appointments") – performed menial tasks such as maintaining the palace furniture, draperies and other appointments

The Shwedaik (ရွှေတိုက်) was the Royal Treasury, and as such, served as the repository of the state's precious metals and treasures. Moreover, the Shwedaik retained the state's archives and maintained various records, including detailed genealogies of hereditary officials and census reports. The Shwedaik was composed of:

- Shwedaik Wun (ရွှေတိုက်ဝန်) – Chancellor of the Exchequer
- Shwedaik Saw (ရွှေတိုက်စော) – Governor of the Treasury
- Shwedaik Kyat (ရွှေတိုက်ကြပ်) – Superintendent
- Shwedaik Saye (ရွှေတိုက်စာရေး) – Clerk of the Treasury
- Shwedaik Thawkaing (ရွှေတိုက်သော့ကိုင်) – Keeper of the Treasury Key

=== Royal service ===
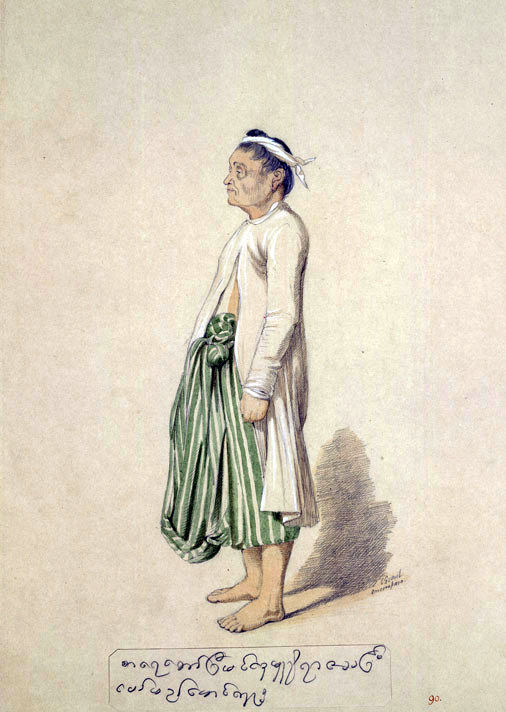
A royal scribe, 1855

Each royal agency included a large retinue of middle and low level officials responsible for day-to-day affairs. These included the:

- Nakhandaw (နားခံတော်) – charged with conveying communications to and from the King and Hluttaw. Also served as intermediary between royal agencies and between king and ministers. Collected, sorted, interpreted reports, read proclamations at official gatherings, transmitted orders to provincial councils.
- Sayedawgyi (စာရေးတော်ကြီး; great chief clerks) – performed executive level work and preliminary investigations for trials
  - Saye (စာရေး; clerks)
- Ameindawgyi (အမိန့်တော်ကြီး; writers of great orders) – prepared and issued royal orders after necessary preliminary steps had been taken.
- Athonsaye (အသုံးစာရေး; clerks of works) – oversaw construction and repairs of all public buildings
- Ahmadawye (အမှတ်တော်ကြီး; recorders of orders) – drafted orders and letters to be issued by Hluttaw
- Awayyauk (အဝေးရောက်; distant arrivals) – received and read letters coming from distance before submission to ministers
- Thandawgan (သံတော်ခံ) – ceremonial officers who received letters on behalf of the king

and 3 classes of ceremonial officers:

1. Letsaungsaye (clerks of presents) – read lists of offerings made to the King at royal functions
2. Yonzaw (master of ceremonies) – arranged royal functions and audiences of the King
3. Thissadawge (recorders of great oaths) – administered oaths of fealty to those entering the royal service

=== Royal court ===
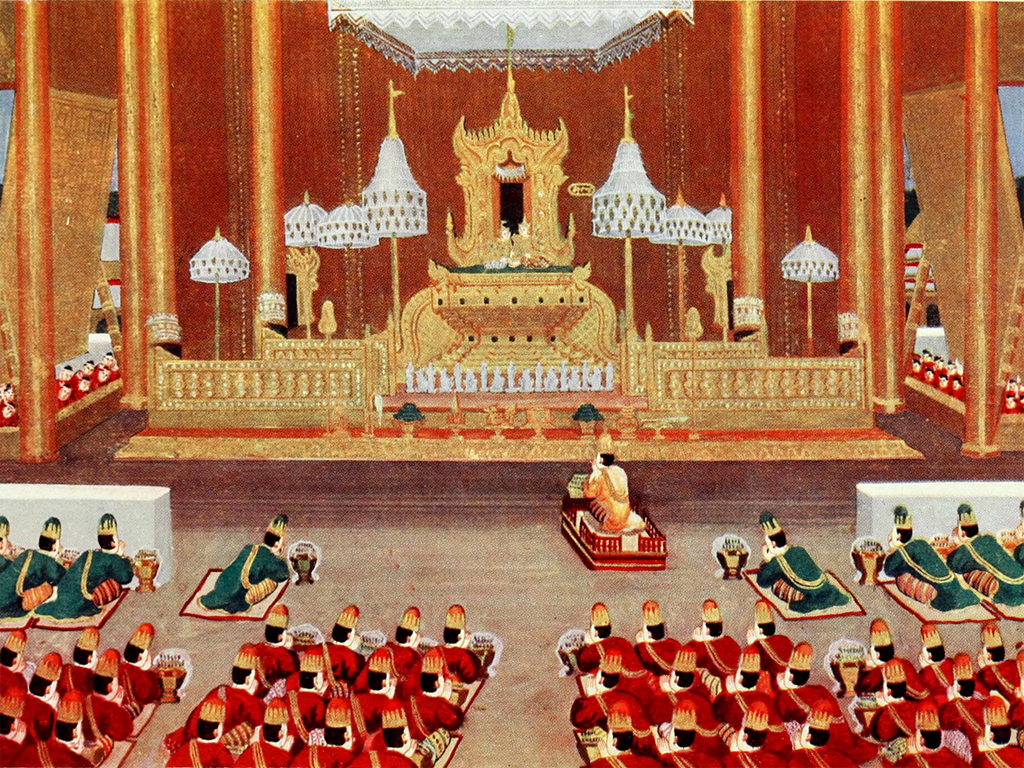
"Royal Audience," a traditional painting by Saya Chone

Konbaung society was centred on the king, who took many wives and fathered numerous children, creating a huge extended royal family which formed the power base of the dynasty and competed for influence at the royal court. It also posed problems of succession at the same time, often resulting in royal massacres.

The Lawka Byuha Kyan (လောကဗျူဟာကျမ်း), also known as the Inyon Sadan (အင်းယုံစာတန်း), is the earliest extant work on Burmese court protocols and customs. The work was written by Inyon Wungyi Thiri Uzana, also known as the Inyon Ywaza, during the reign of Alaungpaya, the founder of the Konbaung dynasty.

Royal court life in the Konbaung dynasty consisted of both codified rituals and ceremonies and those that were innovated with the progression of the dynasty. Many ceremonies were composed of Hindu ideas localised and adapted to existing traditions, both Burmese and Buddhist in origin. These rituals were also used to legitimise the rule of Burmese kings, as the Konbaung monarchs claimed descent from Maha Sammata through the Sakyan clan (of which Gotama Buddha was a member) and the House of Vijaya. Life in the royal court was closely regulated. Eunuchs (မိန်းမဆိုး) oversaw the ladies of the royal household and apartments. Inferior queens and concubines could not reside in the main palace buildings.

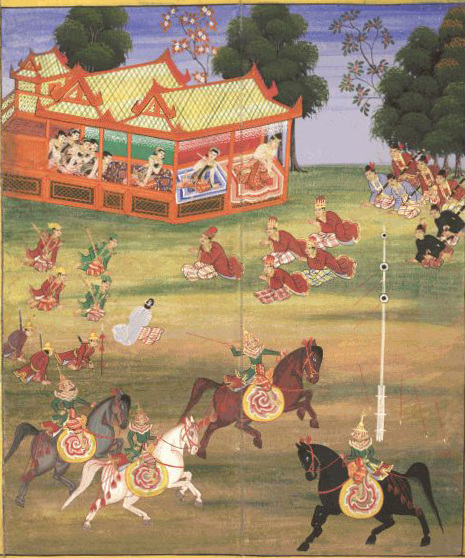
The King and Queen observing a ceremony involving riders on horseback. From an 18th-century parabeik (picture book)

Brahmins, generally known as ponna (ပုဏ္ဏား) in Burmese, served as specialists for ritual ceremonies, astrology, and devotional rites to Hindu deities at the Konbaung court. They played an essential role in king-making rituals, consecration and ablution ceremonies called abhiseka (ဗိဿိတ်). Court Brahmins (ပုရောဟိတ်, parohita) were well embedded in daily life at the court, advising and consulting the king on various matters. A social hierarchy among the Brahmins determined their respective duties and functions. Astrologer Brahmins called huya (ဟူးရား) were responsible for determining astrological calculations, such as determining the auspicious moment for the foundation of a new capital, a new palace, pagoda, or assumption of the royal residence, announcing an appointment, leaving a place, visiting a pagoda or starting a military campaign. They also established the religious calendar, prepared the almanac (သင်္ကြန်စာ), calculated upcoming solar and lunar eclipses, identified major festival days based on the lunar cycle, and communicated auspicious times and dates. A special group of Brahmins who performed abhiseka rituals were also selected as pyinnya shi (ပညာရှိ), appointed royal counselors.

=== Royal rituals ===
Lavish affairs were also organised around the life ceremonies of royal family members. Brahmins presided over many of these auspicious ceremonies, including the construction of a new royal capital; consecration of the new palace, the royal ploughing ceremony; the naming, first rice feeding and cradling ceremonies; the abhiseka head anointing rituals, and the King's participation in Burmese New Year (Thingyan) celebrations. During Thingyan, a group of 8 Brahmins sprinkled water blessed by a group of 8 Buddhist monks, throughout the palace grounds, at the Hluttaw, various courts, the major city gates, and the 4 corners of the capital. The king attended many of the ceremonies involving royal family members, from cradling ceremonies (ပုခက်မင်္ဂလာ) to ear-boring ceremonies, from marriages to funerals.

Specific buildings in the royal palace served as the venue for various life ceremonies. For instance, the Great Audience Hall was where young princes underwent the shinbyu coming-of-age ceremony and were ordained as monk novices. This was also the venue where young princes ceremonially had their hair tied in a topknot (သျှောင်ထုံး). Elaborate Burmese New Year feasts took place at the Hmannandawgyi (Palace of Mirrors): on the third day of the New Year, the king and chief queen partook in Thingyan rice, cooked rice dipped in cold perfumed water, while seated on their throne. Musical and dramatic performances and other feasts were also held in that complex.

==== Consecration ceremonies (abhiseka) ====
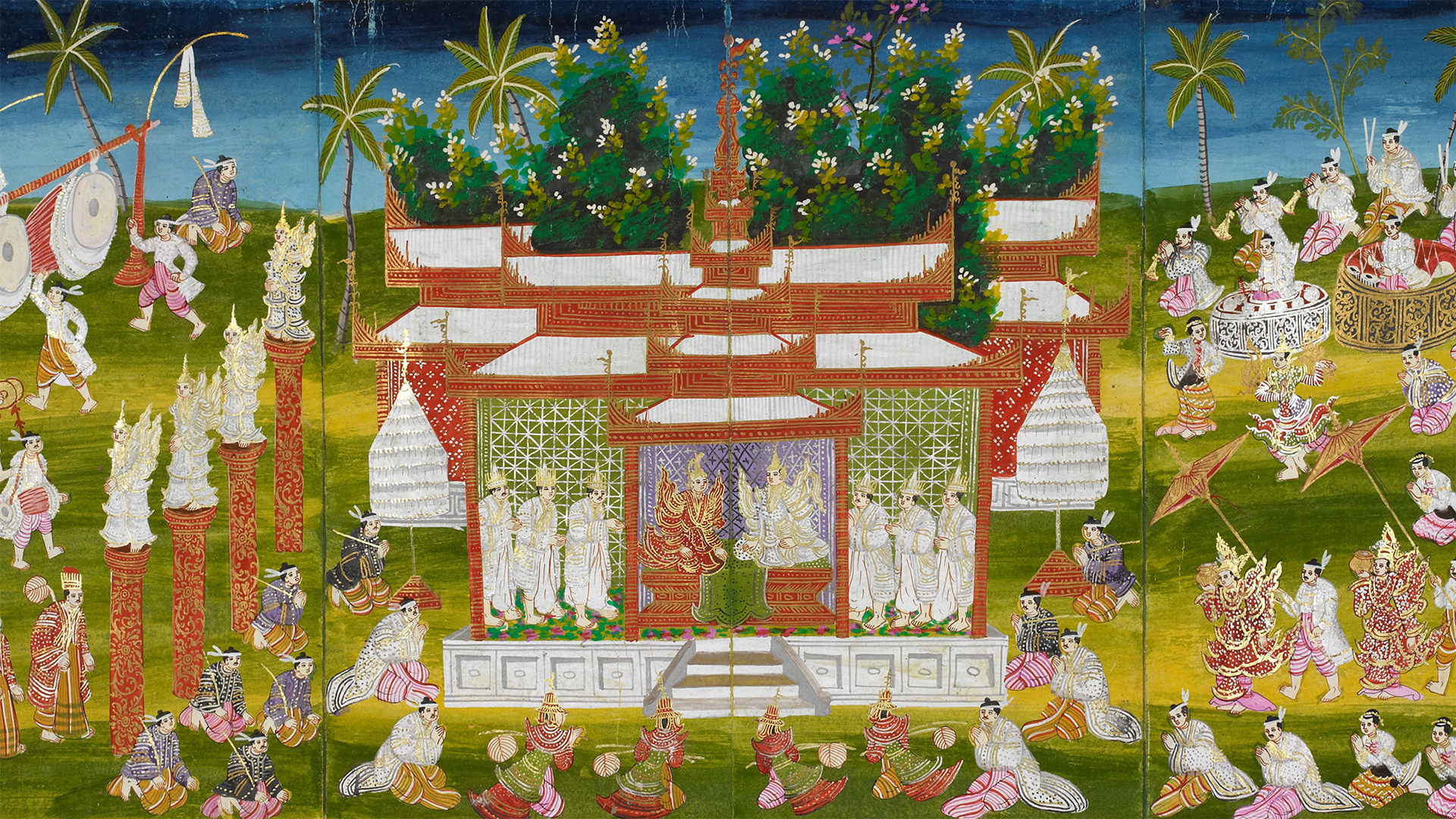
A nineteenth-century watercolor painting by royal painters depicts a Konbaung abhiseka ceremony. The king and queen are, respectively, seated in the pavilion, surrounded by a retinue of Brahmins.

The most significant court functions of a king's reign were the abhiseka or consecratory rituals, held at various times throughout a king's reign, to reinforce his place as the patron of religion (Sasana) and righteousness. Abhiseka rituals all involved the pouring of water from a conch on the candidate's (usually the king's) head, instructing him what to do or not to do for the love of his people and warning him that if he failed to oblige, he might suffer certain miseries. Ablution rituals were the responsibility of a group of 8 elite Brahmins uniquely qualified to perform the ritual. They were to remain chaste before the ceremony. Another group of Brahmins was responsible for the consecration of the Crown Prince.

There were 14 types of abhiseka ceremonies in total:

1. Rājabhiseka (ရာဇဘိသိက်) – coronation of the king
2. Muddhabhiseka (မုဒ္ဓဘိသိက်) – formal vow by the king to work for the propagation of the Sasana (the Buddha's teachings); held five years after accession
3. Uparājabhiseka (ဥပရာဇဘိသေက) – installation of crown prince
4. Mahesībhiseka (မဟေသီဘိသေက) – coronation of chief queen
5. Maṅgalabhiseka (မင်္ဂလာဘိသေက) – held to celebrate the possession of white elephants
6. Siriyabhiseka (သီရိယဘိသေက) – held to renew the king's glory, held on occasion
7. Āyudighabhiseka (အာယုဒီဃဘိသေက) – held to gain longevity, held on occasion
8. Jayabhiseka (ဇေယျာဘိသေက) – held to ensure victory and success in war
9. Mahābhiseka (မဟာဘိသေက) – held to increase economic prosperity, held seven years after accession
10. Sakalabhiseka (သကလာဘိသေက) – held to ensure peace in the kingdom
11. Vijayabhiseka (ဝိဇယဘိသေက) – held to conquer enemies
12. Mandabhiseka (Manda beittheit) – held to marry the candidate to a queen of royal lineage.
13. Singabhiseka (Thenga beittheit) – held to recommit a king to abide by the laws, whereupon full powers for the government and administration of the country are conferred

==== Coronation ====
Rajabhiseka (ရာဇဘိသိက်) – the Coronation of the king, which was presided over by Brahmins, was the most important ritual of the royal court. The ceremony was typically held in the Burmese month of Kason, but did not necessarily occur during the beginning of a reign. The Sasanalinkaya states that Bodawpaya, like his father, was crowned only after establishing control over the kingdom's administration and purifying the religious institutions. The most important features of this ritual were: the fetching of the anointing water; the ceremonial bath; the anointment; and the king's oath.

Elaborate preparations were made precisely for this ceremony. Three ceremonial pavilions (Sihasana or Lion Throne; Gajasana or Elephant Throne; and the Marasana or Peacock Throne) were constructed in a specifically designated plot of land (called the "peacock garden") for this occasion. Offerings were also made to deities and Buddhist parittas were chanted. Specially designated individuals, usually the daughters of dignitaries including merchants and Brahmins, were tasked with procuring anointing water midstream from a river. The water was placed in the respective pavilions.

At an auspicious moment, the king was dressed in the costume of a Brahma and the queen in that of a queen from devaloka. The couple was escorted to the pavilions in procession, accompanied by a white horse or a white elephant. The king first bathed his body in the Morasana pavilion, then his head in the Gajasana pavilion. He then entered the Sihasana pavilion to assume his seat at the coronation throne, crafted to resemble a blooming lotus flower, made of figwood and applied gold leaf. Brahmins handed him the five articles of coronation regalia (မင်းမြောက်တန်ဆာ, Min Myauk Taza):

1. White umbrella (ထီးဖြူ, hti byu)
2. Crown, in the form of a crested headdress (မကိုဋ်, magaik)
3. Sceptre (သန်လျက်, thanlyet)
4. Sandals (ခြေနင်း, che nin)
5. Fly-whisk, made of yak tail (သားမြီးယပ်, thamyi yat)

At his throne, eight princesses anointed the king by pouring specially procured water atop his head, each using a conch bedazzled with gems white solemnly adjuring him in formulae to rule justly. Brahmins then raised a white umbrella over the king's head. This anointment was repeated by eight pure-blooded Brahmins and eight merchants. Afterward, the king repeated words ascribed to Buddha at birth: "I am foremost in all the world! I am most excellent in all the world! I am peerless in all the world!" and made invocation by pouring water from a golden ewer. The ritual ended with the king taking refuge in the Three Jewels.

As part of the coronation, prisoners were released. The king and his pageant returned to the Palace, and the ceremonial pavilions were dismantled and cast into the river. Seven days after the ceremony, the king and members of the royal family made an inaugural procession, circling the city moat on a gilt state barge, amid festive music and spectators.

==== Installation of the Crown Prince ====
Uparājabhiseka (ဥပရာဇဘိသေက) – the Installation of the Uparaja (Crown Prince), in Burmese Einshe Min (အိမ်ရှေ့မင်း), was one of the most important rituals in the king's reign. The Installation Ceremony took place in the Byedaik (Privy Council). The Crown Prince was invested, received appendages and insignias, and was bestowed a multitude of gifts. The king also formally appointed a retinue of household staff to oversee the Prince's public and private affairs. Afterward, the Crown Prince was paraded to his new Palace, commiserate with his new rank. Preparations for a royal wedding with a princess, specially groomed to become the new king's consort, then commenced.

==== Feeding of the first betel ====
Kun U Khun Mingala (ကွမ်းဦးခွံ့မင်္ဂလာ) – the Feeding of the First Betel ceremony was held about 75 days after the birth of a prince or princess to bolster the newborn child's health, prosperity and beauty. The ceremony involved the feeding of betel, mixed with camphor and other ingredients. An appointed official (ဝန်) arranged the rituals preceding the ceremony. These rituals included a specific set of offerings to the Buddha, indigenous spirits (yokkaso, akathaso, bhummaso, etc.), Guardians of the Sasana, and to the parents and grandparents of the child, all of which were arranged in the infant's chamber. Additional offerings were made to the Hundred Phi (ပီတစ်ရာနတ်), a group of 100 Siamese spirits headed by Nandi (နန္ဒီနတ်သမီး), personified by a Brahmin figure made of kusa grass, which was ceremonially fed scoops of cooked rice with the left hand.

==== Naming ceremony ====
Nāmakaraṇa (နာမကရဏ) – the naming ceremony took place 100 days after the birth of a prince or princess. Food was also offered for the dignitaries and entertainers in attendance. The infant's name was inscribed on a gold plate or on palm leaf. The night before the ceremony, a pwe was held for the attendees. The dawn of the ceremony, Buddhist monks delivered a sermon to the court. Afterward, at the Chief Queen's apartment, the infant was seated on a divan with the Chief Queen, with respective attendees from the royal court seated according to rank. A Minister of the Interior then presided over ceremonial offerings (ကုဗ္ဘီး) made to the Triple Gem, the 11 deva headed by Thagyamin, 9 Hindu deities, indigenous nat, and the 100 Phi. A protective prayer was then recited. After the prayer, a pyinnyashi prepared and 'fed' Nandi. At the auspicious moment calculated by astrologers, the name of the infant was read out thrice by the royal herald. Afterward, another royal herald recited an inventory of presents offered by the dignitaries in attendance. At the closing of the ceremony, a feast ensued, with attendees fed in the order of precedence. Offerings to the Buddha were shuttled to the pagodas, and those to Nandi, to the sacrificial Brahmins.

==== Royal Ploughing Ceremony ====
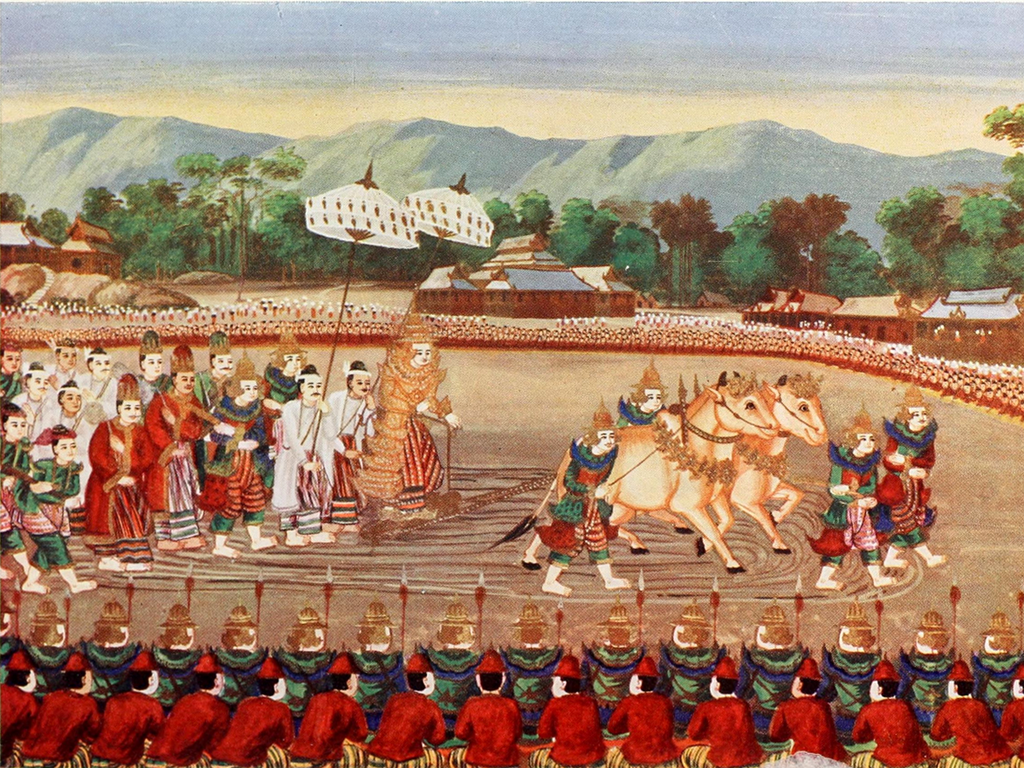
A depiction of the Royal Ploughing Ceremony by Saya Chone, a painter at the royal court

Lehtun Mingala (လယ်ထွန်မင်္ဂလာ) (Note: Also known as Mingala Ledaw (လယ်တော်မင်္ဂလာ) or Ledwin Mingala.) – the Royal Ploughing Ceremony was an annual festival of breaking ground with ploughs in the royal fields east of the royal capital, to ensure sufficient rainfall for the year by propitiating the Moekhaung Nat, who was believed to control rain. The ceremony was traditionally linked to an event in Gotama Buddha's life. During King Suddhodana's royal ploughing of the fields, the infant Buddha rose to stand, sat cross-legged and began to meditate, underneath the shade of a rose apple tree.

The ceremony was held at the beginning of June, at the break of the southwest monsoon. For the ceremony, the king, clad in state robes (a paso with the peacock emblem (daungyut)), a long silk surcoat or tunic encrusted with jewels, a spire-like crown (tharaphu), and 24 strings of the salwe across his chest, and a gold plate or frontlet over his forehead) and his audience made a procession to the leya (royal fields). At the ledawgyi, a specially designated plot of land, milk-white oxen were attached to royal ploughs covered with gold leaf, stood ready for ploughing by ministers, princes and the kings. The oxen were decorated with gold and crimson bands, reins bedecked with rubies and diamonds, and heavy gold tassels hung from the gilded horns. The king initiated the ploughing, and shared this duty among himself, ministers and the princes. After the ceremonial ploughing of the ledawgyi was complete, festivities sprung up throughout the royal capital.

==== Head-washing ceremony ====
At Thingyan and at the end of the Buddhist lent, the king's head was ceremonially washed with water from Gaungsay Gyun (lit. Head Washing Island) between Martaban and Moulmein, near the mouth of the Salween River. After the Second Anglo-Burmese War (which resulted in Gaungsay Gyun falling under British possession), purified water from Irrawaddy River was instead procured. This ceremony also preceded the earboring, headdressing, and marriage ceremonies of the royal family.

==== Obeisance ceremony ====
The Obeisance ceremony was a grand ceremony held at the Great Audience Hall thrice a year where tributary princes and courtiers laid tribute, paid homage to their benefactor, the Konbaung king, and swore their allegiance to the monarchy. The ceremony was held 3 times a year:

1. Hnit Thit Gadaw (နှစ်သစ်ကန်တော့) – Beginning of the Burmese New Year (April)
2. Wa-win Gadaw (ဝါဝင်ကန်တော့) – Beginning of the Buddhist Lent (June or July) – required the attendance of princes, ministers and city officials
3. Wa-gyut Gadaw (ဝါကျွတ်ကန်တော့) – End of the Buddhist Lent (October) – required the attendance of provincial governors and tributary princes (sawbwa)

During this ceremony, the king was seated at the Lion Throne, along with the chief queen, to his right. The Crown Prince was seated immediately before the throne in a cradle-like seat, followed by princes of the blood (min nyi min tha). Constituting the audience were courtiers and dignitaries from vassal states, who were seated according to rank, known in Burmese as Neya Nga Thwe (နေရာငါးသွယ်):

1. Taw Neya (တော်နေရာ);
2. Du Neya (ဒူးနေရာ);
3. Sani (စနည်း);
4. Atwin Bawaw (အတွင်းဘဝေါ);
5. Apyin Bawaw (အပြင်ဘဝေါ)

There, the audience paid obeisance to the monarch and renewed their allegiance to the monarch. Women, barring the chief queen, were not permitted to be seen during these ceremonies. Lesser queens, ministers' wives and other officials were seated in a room behind the throne: the queens were seated in the centre within the railing surrounding the flight of steps, while the wives of ministers and others sat in the space without.

==== Ancestor worship ====
Throughout the Konbaung dynasty, the royal family performed ancestral rites to honour their immediate ancestors. These rites were performed at the thrice a year at the Zetawunsaung (Jetavana Hall or "Hall of Victory"), which housed the Goose Throne (ဟင်္သာသနပလ္လင်), immediately preceding the Obeisance Ceremony. On a platform in a room to the west of the hall, the king and members of the royal family paid obeisance to images of monarchs and consorts of the Konbaung dynasty. Offerings and Pali prayers from a book of odes were also made to the images. The images, which stood 6 to 24 inches (150 to 610 mm) tall, were made of solid gold. Images were only made for Konbaung kings at their death (if he died on the throne) or for Konbaung queens (if she died while her consort was on the throne), but not of a king who died after deposition or a queen who survived her husband. Items used by the deceased personage (e.g., sword, spear, betel box) were preserved along with the associated image. After the British conquest of Upper Burma, 11 images fell into the hands of the Superintendent at the Governor's Residence, Bengal, where they were melted down.

==== Funerals ====
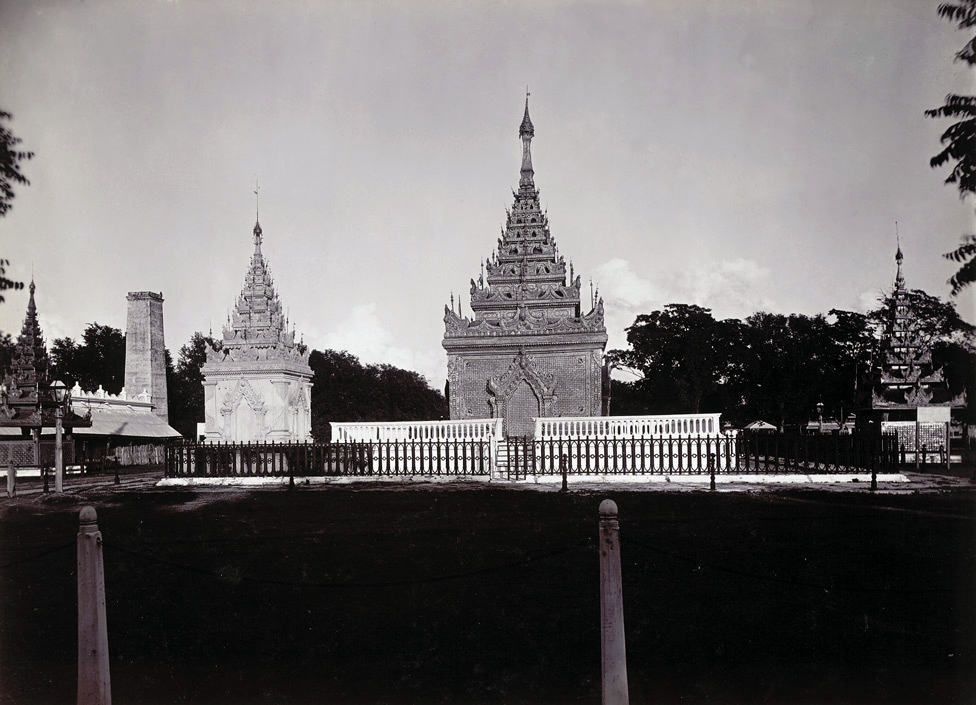
The tomb of King Mindon on the grounds of Mandalay Palace in 1903

When a king died, his royal white umbrella was broken and the great drum and gong at the palace's bell tower (at the eastern gate of the palace), was struck. It was customary for members of the royal family, including the king, to be cremated: their ashes were put into a velvet bag and thrown into the river. King Mindon Min was the first to break tradition; his remains were not cremated, but instead were buried intact, according to his wishes, at the place where his tomb now stands. Before his burial, the King Mindon's body was laid in state before his throne at the Hmannandawgyi (Palace of Mirrors).

==== Foundation sacrifice ====
The Foundation Sacrifice was a Burmese practice whereby human victims known as myosade (မြို့စတေး) were ceremonially sacrificed by burial during the foundation of a royal capital, to propitiate and appease the guardian spirits. to ensure impregnability of the capital city. The victims were crushed to death underneath a massive teak post erected near each gateway, and at the four corners of the city walls, to render the city secure and impregnable. Although this practice contradicted the fundamental tenets of Buddhism, it was in alignment with prevailing animistic beliefs, which dictated that the spirits of persons who suffered violent deaths became nats (spirits) and protective and possessive of their death sites. The preferred sites for such executions were the city's corners and the gates, the most vulnerable defence points.

The Konbaung monarchs followed ancient precedents and traditions to found the new royal city. Brahmins were tasked with planning these sacrificial ceremonies and determining the auspicious day according to astrological calculations and the signs of individuals best suited for sacrifice. Usually, victims were selected from a spectrum of social classes, or unfortuitously apprehended against their will during the day of the sacrifice. Women in the latter stages of pregnancy were preferred, as the sacrifice would yield two guardian spirits instead of one.

Such sacrifices took place at the foundation of Wunbe In Palace in Ava in 1676 and may have taken place at the foundation of Mandalay in 1857. Royal court officials at the time claimed that the tradition was dispensed altogether, with flowers and fruit offered in lieu of human victims. Burmese chronicles and contemporary records only make mention of large jars of oil buried at the identified locations, which was, by tradition, to ascertain whether the spirits would continue to protect the city (i.e., so long as the oil remained intact, the spirits were serving their duty). Shwe Yoe's The Burman describes 52 men, women and children buried, with 3 buried under the post near each of the twelve gates of the city walls, one at each corner of those walls, one at each corner of the teak stockade, one under each of the four entrances to the Palace, and four under the Lion Throne. Taw Sein Ko's Annual Report for 1902–03 for the Archaeological Survey of India mentions only four victims buried at the corners of the city walls.

==== Devotional rituals ====
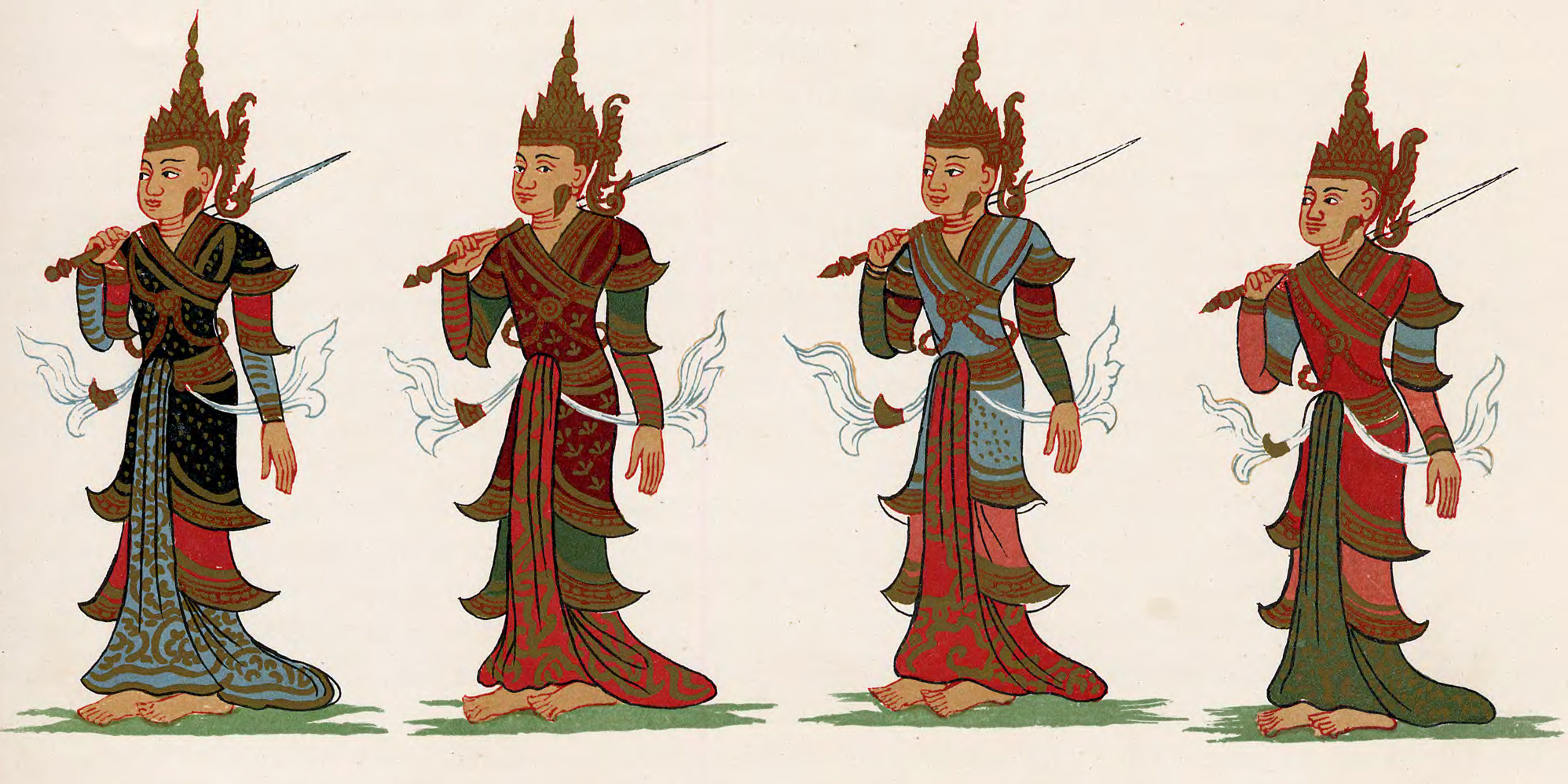
The Guardians of the Four Cardinal Directions (Lokapala) in Burmese depiction

Brahmins at the Konbaung court regularly performed a variety of grand devotional rituals to indigenous spirits (nat) and Hindu deities. The following were the most important devotional cults:

- Ganesha (Maha Peinne in Burmese) – During the Burmese month of Nadaw (November to December), a festival for Ganesha, the god of prudence and good policy, was held. Grain first reaped from the royal fields was sent to the Mahamuni Buddha Temple as an offering to Ganesha, in three huge containers in the shape of a buffalo, bullock and prawn, in which paddy, millet, and bulrush millet were respectively placed. Ganesha, mounted on a peacock, was placed on a ceremonial procession and was then brought before the king, who after paying homage, scattered pieces of silver and clothes among the poor. Ganesha occupied a prominent place in royal ceremonies, especially as he was considered a guardian deity of the elephants. Offerings to Ganesha, made in the Burmese month of Tazaungmon were established during Bodawpaya's reign.
- Phaya Ko Zu (ဘုရားကိုးဆူ, lit. "Nine Deities") – This was a devotional rite performed by Khettara Brahmins. The deities referenced were either Buddhist: Buddha and the 8 arahats, or non-Buddhist: 5 Hindu deities, including Candi and Ganesha, and 4 nats.
- Skanda (Sakanta or Sakanta Tattika) – King Bodawpaya reformed the annual ceremonial procession to honour Ganesha to instead honour Skanda, the god of war (and a son of Shiva and Candi), following the advice of a Brahmin from Benares. (Note: Said Brahmin had the following issue: by the Govinda-maharajinda-aggamahadhammarajaguru.) This procession was held in the Burmese month of Tabaung. Skanda was closely linked with a deity called Citrabali-mara (Cittarapali-mar[a]), both of whom were connected to rituals mentioned in Rajamattan, a standard reference for ceremonies at the royal court compiled during Bodawphaya's reign.
- Hindu deities: Candi (Canni), Indra (Thagyamin), Shiva, Vishnu, Asuras and the 4 Lokapala – These deities were placed at specific locations, at the entrances of the capital city, the royal palace, or in temples, to ward off evil.
- Other spirits (nat): Planets, Sky, Sun, Moon, Hon (the fire spirit)

== Socioeconomic governance ==
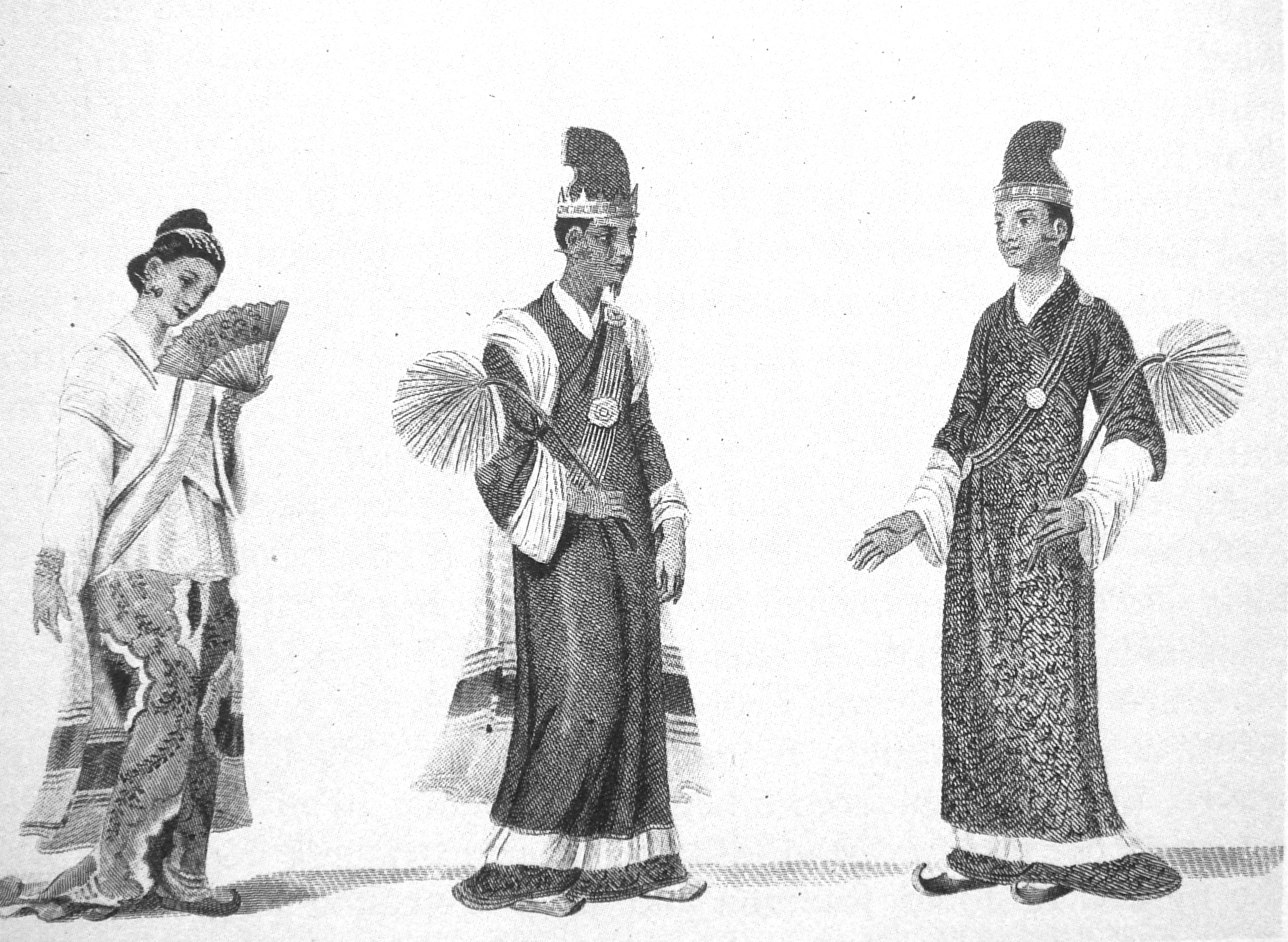
Burmese court officials in 1795

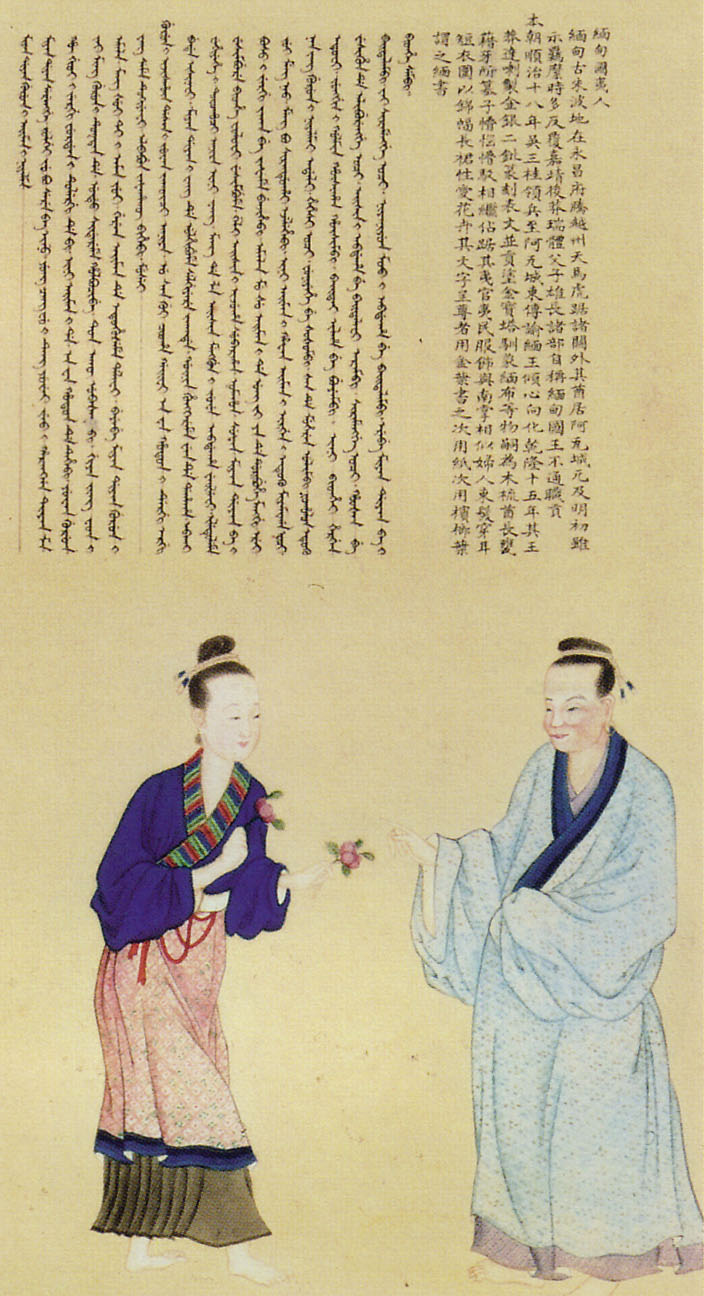
Burmese civilians in 1760s painted by Chinese.

=== Social classes ===
During the Konbaung dynasty, Burmese society was highly stratified. Loosely modelled on the four Hindu varnas, Konbaung society was divided into four general social classes (အမျိုးလေးပါး) by descent:

1. Rulers (မင်းမျိုး) or Khattiya (ခတ္တိယ)
2. Ritualists (ပုဏ္ဏားမျိုး) or Brahmana (ဗြာဟ္မဏ)
3. Merchants (သူဌေးမျိုး) or Vessa (ဝေဿ)
4. Commoners (ဆင်းရဲသားမျိုး) or Tudda (သုဒ္ဒ)

Society also distinguished between the free and slaves (ကျွန်မျိုး), who were indebted persons or prisoners of war (including those brought back from military campaigns in Arakan, Ayuthaya, and Manipur), but could belong to one of the four classes. There was also distinction between taxpayers and non-taxpayers. Tax-paying commoners were called athi (အသည်), whereas non-taxpaying individuals, usually affiliated to the royal court or under government service, were called ahmuhtan (အမှုထမ်း).

Outside of hereditary positions, there were two primary paths to influence: joining the military (မင်းမှုထမ်း) and joining the Buddhist Sangha in the monasteries.

=== Sumptuary laws ===
Sumptuary laws called yazagaing dictated life and consumption for Burmese subjects in the Konbaung kingdom, everything from the style of one's house to clothing suitable to one's social standing from regulations concerning funerary ceremonies and the coffin to be used to usage of various speech forms based on rank and social status. In particular, sumptuary laws in the royal capital were exceedingly strict and the most elaborate in character.

For instance, sumptuary laws forbade ordinary Burmese subjects to build houses of stone or brick and dictated the number of tiers on the ornamental spired roof (called pyatthat) allowed above one's residence—the royal palace's Great Audience Hall and the 4 main gates of the royal capital, as well as monasteries, were allowed 9 tiers while those of the most powerful tributary princes (sawbwa) were permitted 7, at most.

Sumptuary laws ordained 5 types of funerals and rites accorded to each: the king, royal family members, holders of ministerial offices, merchants and those who possessed titles, and peasants (who received no rites at death).

Sumptuary regulations regarding dress and ornamentation were carefully observed. Designs with the peacock insignia were strictly reserved for the royal family and long-tailed hip-length jackets (ထိုင်မသိမ်းအင်္ကျီ) and surcoats were reserved for officials. Velvet sandals (ကတ္တီပါဖိနပ်) were worn exclusively by royals. Gold anklets were worn only by the royal children. Silk cloth, brocaded with gold and silver flowers and animal figures were only permitted to be worn by members of the royal family and ministers' wives. Adornment with jewels and precious stones was similarly regulated. Usage of hinthapada (ဟင်္သပဒါး), a vermilion dye made from cinnabar was regulated.

=== Demography ===
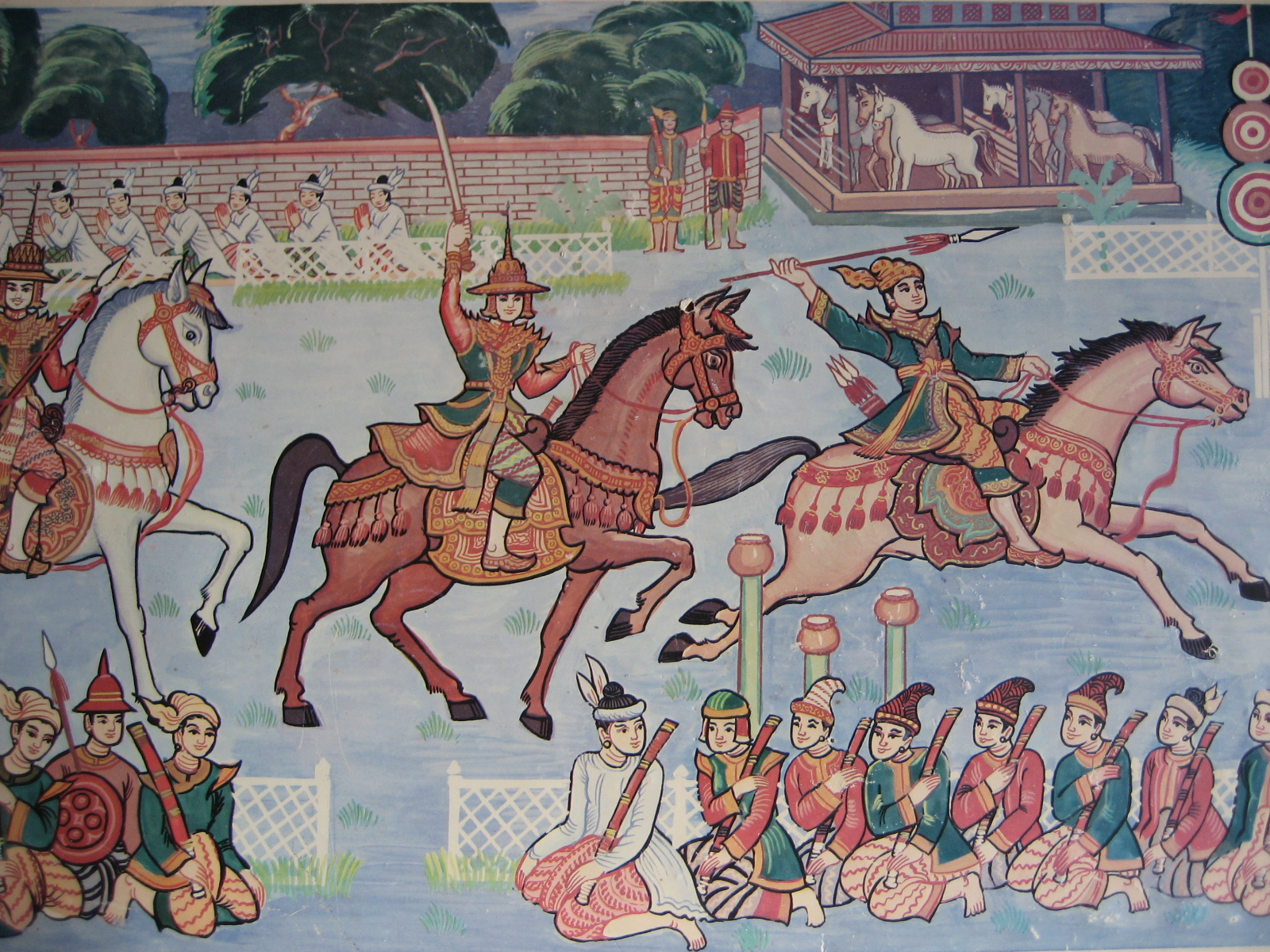
Konbaung era Myinkhin Thabin

Throughout the Konbaung dynasty, cultural integration continued. For the first time in history, the Burmese language and culture came to predominate the entire Irrawaddy valley, with the Mon language and ethnicity completely eclipsed by 1830. The nearer Shan principalities adopted more lowland norms.

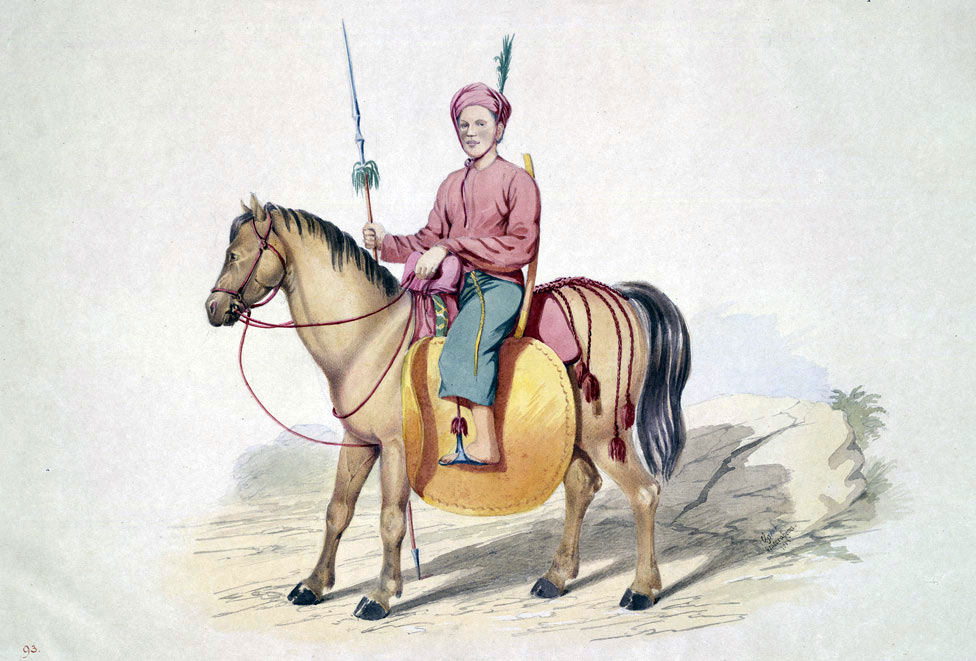
An 1855 watercolour of a Kathe horseman from Manipur

Captives from various military campaigns in their hundreds and thousands were brought back to the kingdom and resettled as hereditary servants to royalty and nobility or dedicated to pagodas and temples; these captives added new knowledge and skills to Burmese society and enriched Burmese culture. They were encouraged to marry into the host community thus enriching the gene pool as well. Captives from Manipur formed the cavalry called Kathè myindat (Cassay Horse) and also Kathè a hmyauk tat (Cassay Artillery) in the royal Burmese army. Even captured French soldiers, led by Chevalier Milard, were forced into the Burmese army. The incorporated French troops with their guns and muskets played a key role in the later battles between the Burmese and the Mons. They became an elite corps, which was to play a role in the Burmese battles against the Siamese (attacks and capture of Ayutthaya from 1760 to 1765) and the Manchus (battles against the Chinese armies of the Qianlong Emperor from 1766 to 1769). Muslim eunuchs from Arakan also served in the Konbaung court.

A small community of foreign scholars, missionaries and merchants also lived in Konbaung society. Besides mercenaries and adventurers who had offered their services since the arrival of the Portuguese in the 16th century, a few Europeans served as ladies-in-waiting to the last queen Supayalat in Mandalay, a missionary established a school attended by Mindon's several sons including the last king Thibaw, and an Armenian had served as a king's minister at Amarapura.

Among the most visible non-Burmans of the royal court were Brahmins. They typically originated from one of four locales:

- Manipur – acquired with the conquest of Manipur; perhaps from Bengal, since Manipur was Hinduised by Bengali Brahmins in the 1700s
- Arakan – acquired with the conquest of Arakan in 1785 by King Bodawpaya's son, Thado Minsaw
- Sagaing – long-established lines of Brahmins at Burman and Mon royal courts, who traced their origins to ninth century Sri Ksetra or 14th century Sagaing
- Benares – Indian Brahmins from Benares who arrived in upper Burma between the late 1700s to early 1800s.

=== Literature and arts ===
The evolution and growth of Burmese literature and theatre continued, aided by an extremely high adult male literacy rate for the era (half of all males and 5% of females). Foreign observers such as Michael Symes remarked on widespread literacy among commoners, from peasants to watermen.

The Siamese captives carried off from Ayutthaya as part of the Burmese–Siamese War (1765–67) went on to have an outsize influence on traditional Burmese theatre and dance. In 1789, a Burmese royal commission consisting of Princes and Ministers was charged with translating Siamese and Javanese dramas from Thai to Burmese. With the help of Siamese artists captured from Ayutthaya in 1767, the commission adapted two important epics from Thai to Burmese: the Siamese Ramayana and the Enao, the Siamese version of Javanese Panji tales into Burmese Yama Zattaw and Enaung Zattaw. One classical Siamese dance, called Yodaya Aka (lit. Ayutthaya-style dance) is considered one of the most delicate of all traditional Burmese dances.

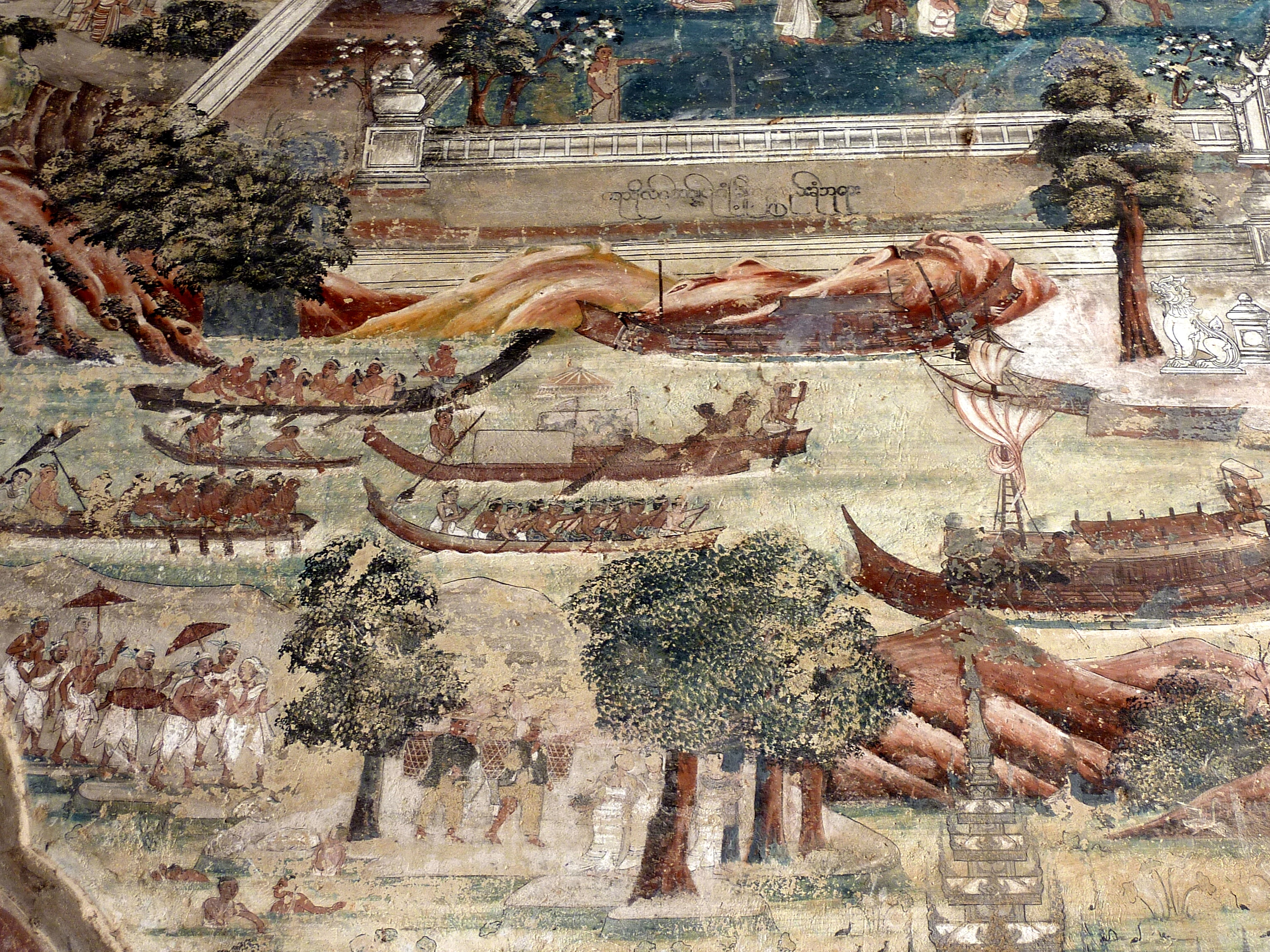
Wall Painting depicting boating in Kyaukawgyi, Amarapura

During the Konbaung period, the techniques of European painting like linear perspective, chiaroscuro and sfumato became more established amongst Burmese painting style. Temple paintings from this period utilized techniques such as by casting shadows and distance haze on traditional Burmese styles. The Konbaung period also developed parabaik folding-book manuscripts styles that recorded court and royal activities by painting on white parabaik.

In the earlier part of the dynasty, between 1789 and 1853, the Amarapura style of Buddha image statuary art developed. Artisans used a unique style using wood gild with gold leaf and red lacquer. The rounder faced image of the Buddha from this period may have been influenced by the capture of the Mahamuni Image from Arakan. After Mindon Min moved the capital to Mandalay, a new Mandalay style of Buddha images developed, depicting a new curly-haired Buddha image and using alabaster and bronze as materials. This later style would be retained through the British colonial period.

=== Architecture ===
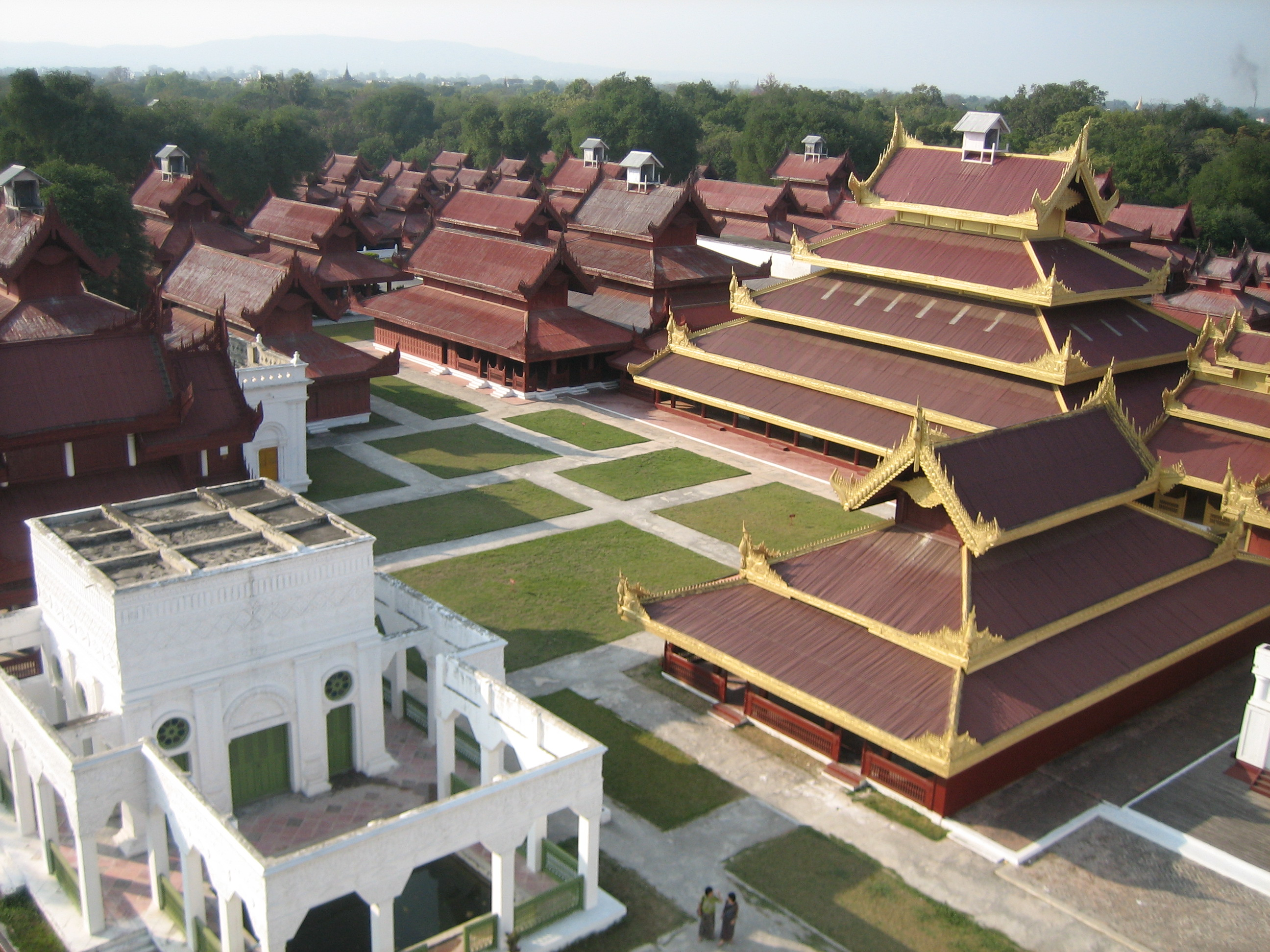
The royal palace of Mandalay

Burmese dynasties had a long history of building regularly planned cities along the Irawaddy valley between the 14th and 19th centuries. Town planning in pre-modern Burma reached its climax during the Konbaung period with cities such as Mandalay. Alaungpaya directed many town planning initiatives. He built many small fortified towns with major defences. One of these, Rangoon, was founded in 1755 as a fortress and sea harbor. The city had an irregular plan with stockades made of teak logs on a ground rampart. Rangoon had six city gates with each gate flanked by massive brick towers with typical merlons with cross-shaped embrasures. The stupa of Shwedagon, Sule and Botataung were located outside the city walls. The city had main roads paved with bricks and drains along the sides.

This period also saw a proliferation of stupas and temples with developments in stucco techniques. Wooden monasteries of this period intricately decorated with wood carvings of the Jataka Tales, are one of the more prominent, distinctive examples of traditional Burmese architecture that survive to the present day.

=== Religion ===
Monastic and lay elites around the Konbaung kings, particularly from Bodawpaya's reign, launched a major reformation of Burmese intellectual life and monastic organisation and practice known as the Sudhamma Reformation. It led to, amongst other things, Burma's first proper state histories. The Buddhist religion was often the center of their political ideologies, with the monarch presenting itself as the Dhammaraja, a righteous protector of the Dharma, as royal legitimacy wasn't just rooted in military conquests and dynasty successors, but also in the patronage of the Buddhist institutions.

== Rulers ==
No	Formal title in Pali	Title used by chronicles		Lineage	Reign	Notes
No	Formal title in Pali	Title	Literal meaning	Lineage	Reign	Notes
1	Sīri Pavara Vijaya Nanda Jatha Mahādhammarāja	Alaungpaya	Future Buddha-King	village headman	1752–1760	Founder of the dynasty and the Third Burmese Empire, invaded Ayutthaya.
2	Siripavaradhammarāja	Naungdawgyi	Royal Elder Brother	son	1760–1763	Invaded Ayutthaya with his father.
3	Sirisūriyadhamma Mahadhammarāja Rājadhipati	Hsinbyushin	Lord of the White Elephant	brother	1763–1776	Invaded and sacked Ayutthaya, invaded Chiang Mai and Laos, invaded Manipur, successfully repulsed four Chinese invasions.
4	Mahādhammarājadhirāja	Singu Min	Singu King	son	1776–1781	
5	–	Phaungkaza Maung Maung	Lord of Phaungka Younger Brother	cousin (son of Naungdawgyi)	1782	The shortest reign in Konbaung history of just over one week.
6	Siripavaratilokapaṇdita Mahādhammarājadhirāja	Bodawpaya	Royal Lord Grandfather	uncle (son of Alaungpaya)	1782–1819	Invaded and annexed Arakan, invaded Rattanakosin (Bangkok).
7	Siri Tribhavanaditya Pavarapaṇdita Mahādhammarajadhirāja	Bagyidaw	Royal Elder Uncle	grandson	1819–1837	Invaded Ayutthaya with his grandfather, invaded Assam and Manipur, defeated in the First Anglo-Burmese War.
8	Siri Pavarāditya Lokadhipati Vijaya Mahādhammarājadhirāja	Tharrawaddy Min	Tharrawaddy King	brother	1837–1846	Fought in the First Anglo-Burmese War as Prince of Tharrawaddy.
9	Siri Sudhamma Tilokapavara Mahādhammarājadhirāja	Pagan Min	Pagan King	son	1846–1853	Overthrown by Mindon after his defeat in the Second Anglo-Burmese War.
10	Siri Pavaravijaya Nantayasapaṇḍita Tribhavanāditya Mahādhammarājadhirāja	Mindon Min	Mindon King	half-brother	1853–1878	Sued for peace with the British; had a very narrow escape in a palace rebellion by two of his sons but his brother Crown Prince Ka Naung was killed.
11	Siripavara Vijayānanta Yasatiloka Dhipati Paṇḍita Mahādhammarājadhirāja	Thibaw Min	Thibaw King	son	1878–1885	The last king of Burma, forced to abdicate and exiled to India after his defeat in the Third Anglo-Burmese War.

Note: Naungdawgyi was the eldest brother of Hsinbyushin and Bodawpaya, who was the grandfather of Bagyidaw, who was Mindon's elder uncle. They were known by these names to posterity, although the formal titles at their coronation by custom ran to some length in Pali; Mintayagyi paya (Lord Great King) was the equivalent of Your/His Majesty whereas Hpondawgyi paya (Lord Great Glory) would be used by the royal family.

=== Family tree ===
1
Alaungpaya (1752–1760)	Yun San
3	6	2
Me Hla	Hsinbyushin (1763–1776)	Bodawpaya (1782–1819)	Naungdawgyi (1760–1763)	Shin Hpo U
4	5
Singu Min (1776–1781)	Thado Minsaw	Phaungka (1782)
7	8
Bagyidaw (1819–1837)	Tharrawaddy (1837–1846)
9	10
Pagan (Note: Half brother of Mindon, son of Princess Me Myat Shwe.) (1846–1853)	Mindon (Note: Half brother of Pagan.) (1853–1878)	Laungshe Mibaya
11
Thibaw (1878–1885)

— Royal house — Konbaung dynasty Founding year: 1752 Deposition: 1885
Preceded by Taungoo dynasty	Dynasty of Burma; 29 February 1752 – 29 November 1885	Vacant Monarchy abolished British rule

=== Pretenders ===
After the abolition of the monarchy, the title of Royal Householder of the Konbaung dynasty nominally passed to Myat Phaya Lat, Thibaw's second daughter, as the King's eldest daughter had renounced her royal titles to be with an Indian commoner.

Thibaw's third daughter Myat Phaya Galay returned to Burma and sought the return of the throne from the British in the 1920s. Her eldest son Taw Phaya Gyi was taken by Imperial Japan during the Second World War for his potential as a puppet king. Japan's efforts failed due to Taw Phaya Gyi's distaste of the Japanese and his assassination in 1948 by Communist insurgents.

After the death of Myat Phaya Lat, her grandson-in-law Taw Phaya became the nominal Royal Householder. Taw Phaya was the son of Myat Phaya Galay, the brother of Taw Phaya Gyi and the husband of Myat Phaya Lat's granddaughter Hteik Su Gyi Phaya. Upon Taw Phaya's death in 2019, it is unclear who serves as the Royal Householder. Soe Win, the eldest son of Taw Phaya Gyi is assumed to be the Royal Householder as there is little public information about Taw Phaya's children.

== See also ==
- History of Burma
