= Shwebo Palace =

Royal palace in Shwebo, Myanmar

Shwebon Yadana Mingala Palace
- ရွှေဘုံရတနာ မင်္ဂလာနန်းတော်
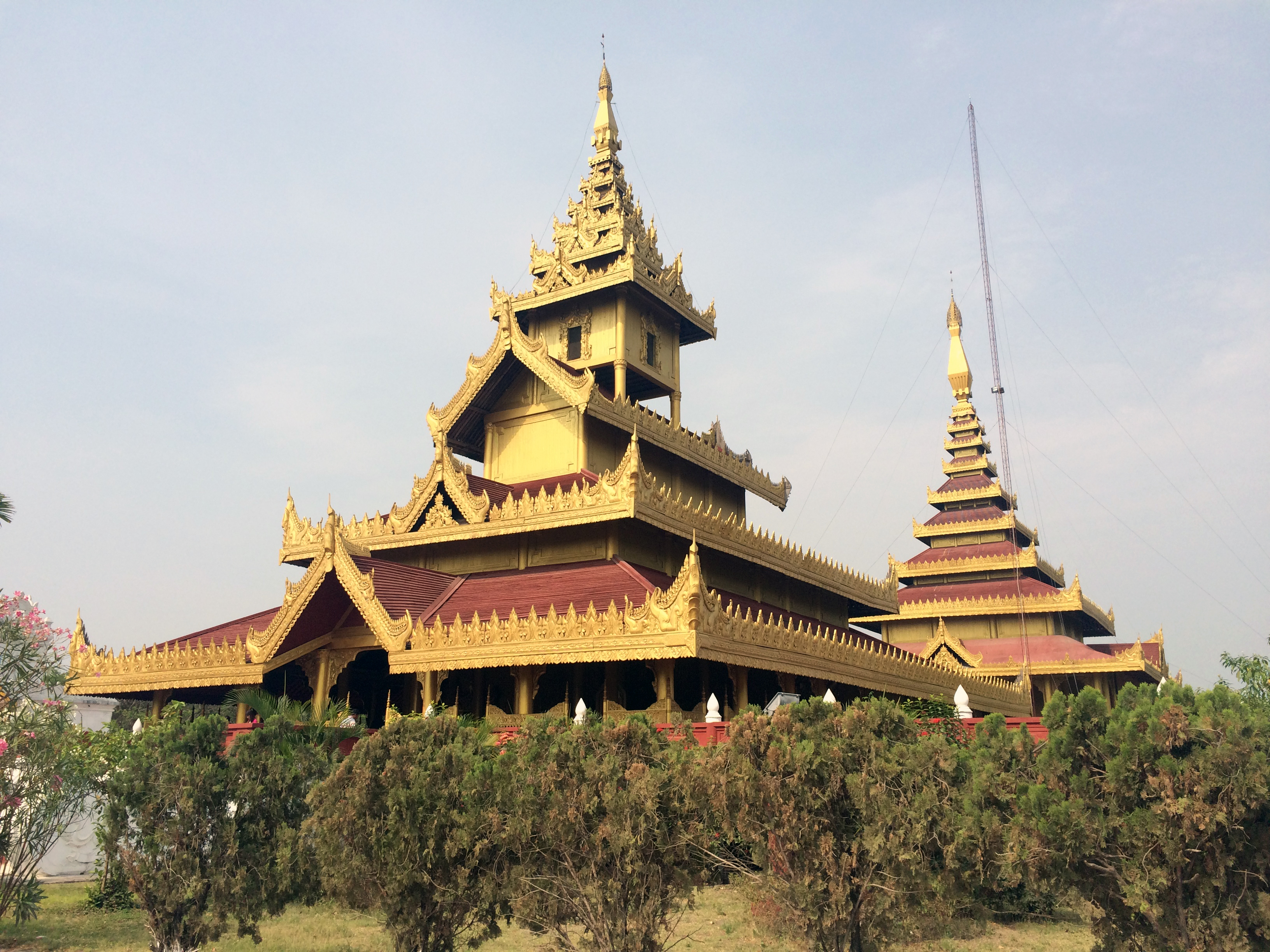
- A reconstructed section of Shwebo Palace
- Interactive map of the Shwebon Yadana Mingala Palace area

General information
- Status: Reconstructed; historical site
- Architectural style: Traditional Burmese palace architecture
- Location: Shwebo, Sagaing Region, Myanmar
- Coordinates: 22.5658°N 95.6938°E
- Completed: Original: 1754 (main palace); Reconstructed: 1999
- Owner: Government of Myanmar

Design and construction
- Known for: Capital of the Konbaung Dynasty (1752-1760); birthplace of King Alaungpaya

Shwebon Yadana Mingala Palace (Burmese: ရွှေဘုံရတနာ မင်္ဂလာနန်းတော်) is a royal palace in Shwebo, Myanmar. The palace was originally built in 1753 AD by King Alaungphaya U Aung Zeya, who was the founder of the Konbaung dynasty and was capital city until 1760 when the capital was moved to nearby Sagain. Different to other Royal palaces in Myanmar it was centered on a large, graduated pavilion. Having two walls, the outer wall forms a 3.5-kilometre (2.2 mi) square closure, surrounded by a moat. With the tomb of King Alaungpaya located to the southeast of the palace building. It was reconstructed in 1999 based on a mid 19th-century manuscript on a November 1853 expedition to collect the remaining timber posts of the palace, carve them out, and turn them into sacred images. It has 200-metre (660 ft) long city walls.

The palace is home to the Shwebonyadana Palace Museum, built in 1994 and opened in 1999. The museum replaced an earlier museum that was first established in 1904.
