= Figwood =

Figwood is a common name for several plants and may refer to:

- Ficus fraseri
- Ficus opposita
- Ficus virgata
