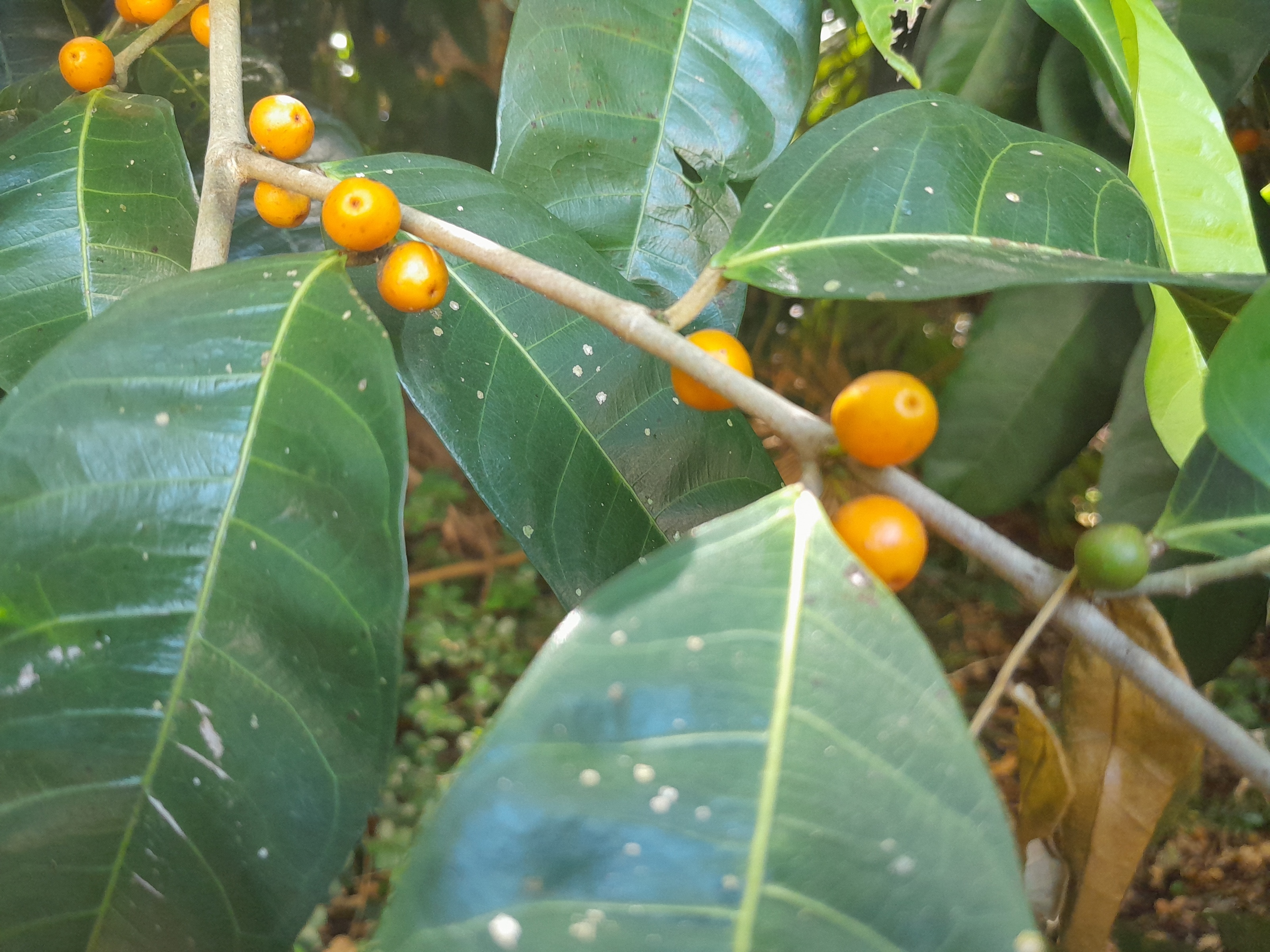
- Growing in the Cairns Botanic Gardens

Conservation status
- Least Concern (IUCN 3.1)
- Least Concern (NCA)

Scientific classification
- Kingdom: Plantae
- Clade: Tracheophytes
- Clade: Angiosperms
- Clade: Eudicots
- Clade: Rosids
- Order: Rosales
- Family: Moraceae
- Genus: Ficus
- Species: F. virgata

Binomial name
- Ficus virgata Reinw. ex Blume

Synonyms
- 20 Synonyms: Ficus cuspidatolongifolia Kaneh.; Ficus decaisneana Miq.; Ficus decaisneana var. firmula (Miq.) King; Ficus decaisneana var. trymatocarpa (Miq.) King; Ficus ellipsoidea Miq.; Ficus esmeralda F.M.Bailey; Ficus firmula Miq.; Ficus insularis Miq.; Ficus magnifica Elmer; Ficus philippinensis Miq.; Ficus philippinensis f. magnifica (Elmer) Sata; Ficus philippinensis f. obovata Sata; Ficus philippinensis var. sessilis Bureau; Ficus philippinensis f. setibracteata (Elmer) Sata; Ficus pinkiana F.Muell.; Ficus setibracteata Elmer; Ficus trymatocarpa Miq.; Ficus virgata var. philippinensis (Miq.) Corner; Ficus virgata var. sessilis (Bureau) Corner; Urostigma virgatum (Reinw. ex Blume) Miq.

= Ficus virgata =

Figwood

Species of flowering plant

Ficus virgata, commonly known as figwood, is a tree in the family Moraceae. It is native to the Ryukyu Islands, Taiwan, Borneo, Sulawesi, the Lesser Sunda and Maluku Islands, Papuasia, Queensland, the Caroline Islands, New Caledonia, and Vanuatu. It usually grows as a strangler on other trees, eventually smothering and killing its host, but may also grow on its own. In Australia it is found from Kutini-Payamu National Park in the northern part of Cape York Peninsula, south along the east coast to Paluma Range National Park, from sea level up to about 400 m (1,300 ft) elevation. It was named by Dutch botanist Carl Ludwig Blume in 1825.

== Conservation ==
As of January 2025, this species has been assessed to be of least concern by the International Union for Conservation of Nature (IUCN) and under the Queensland Government's Nature Conservation Act.

== Gallery ==
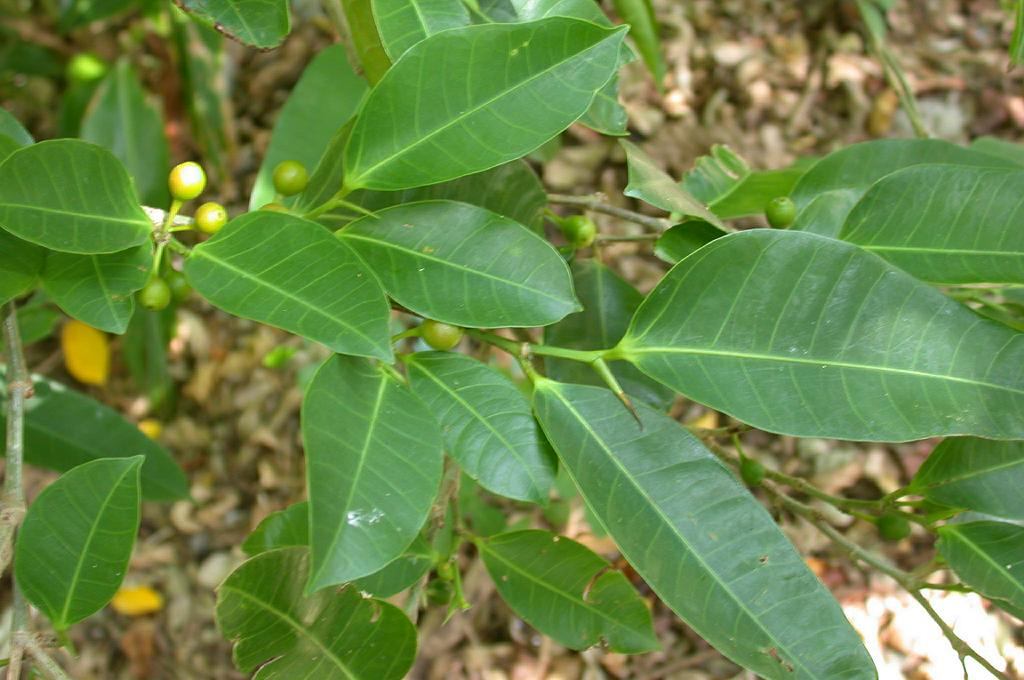
Foliage

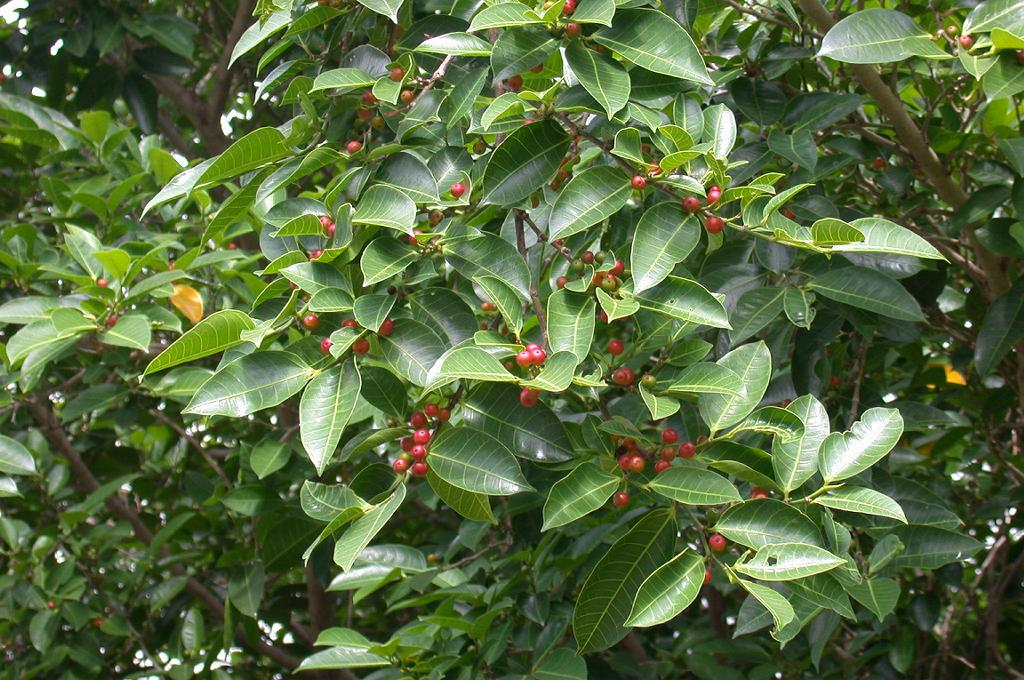
Foliage and fruits

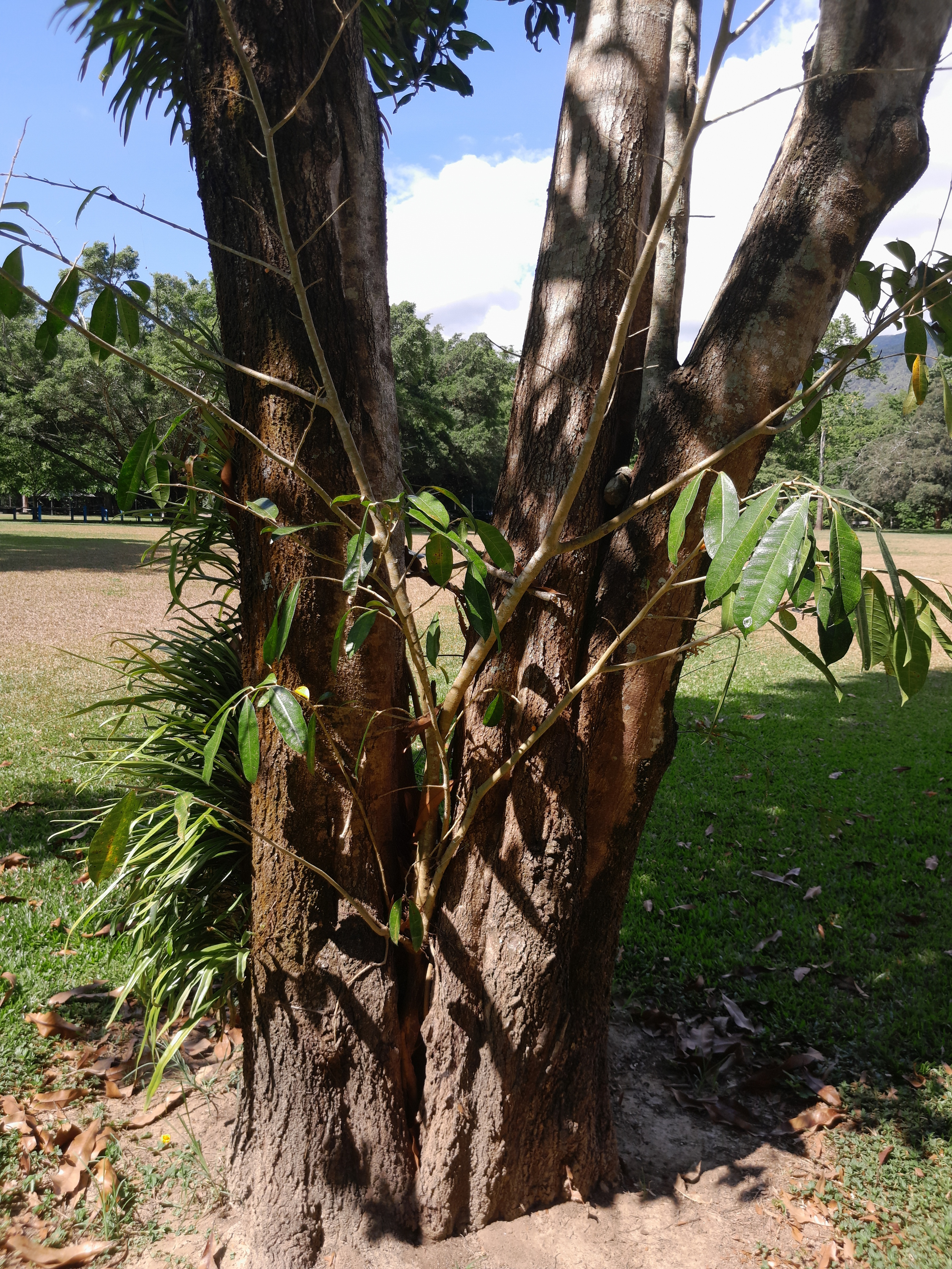
Young plant, growing in the fork of a larger tree
