= Shwebo =

Shwebo ရွှေဘိုမြို့
- Town
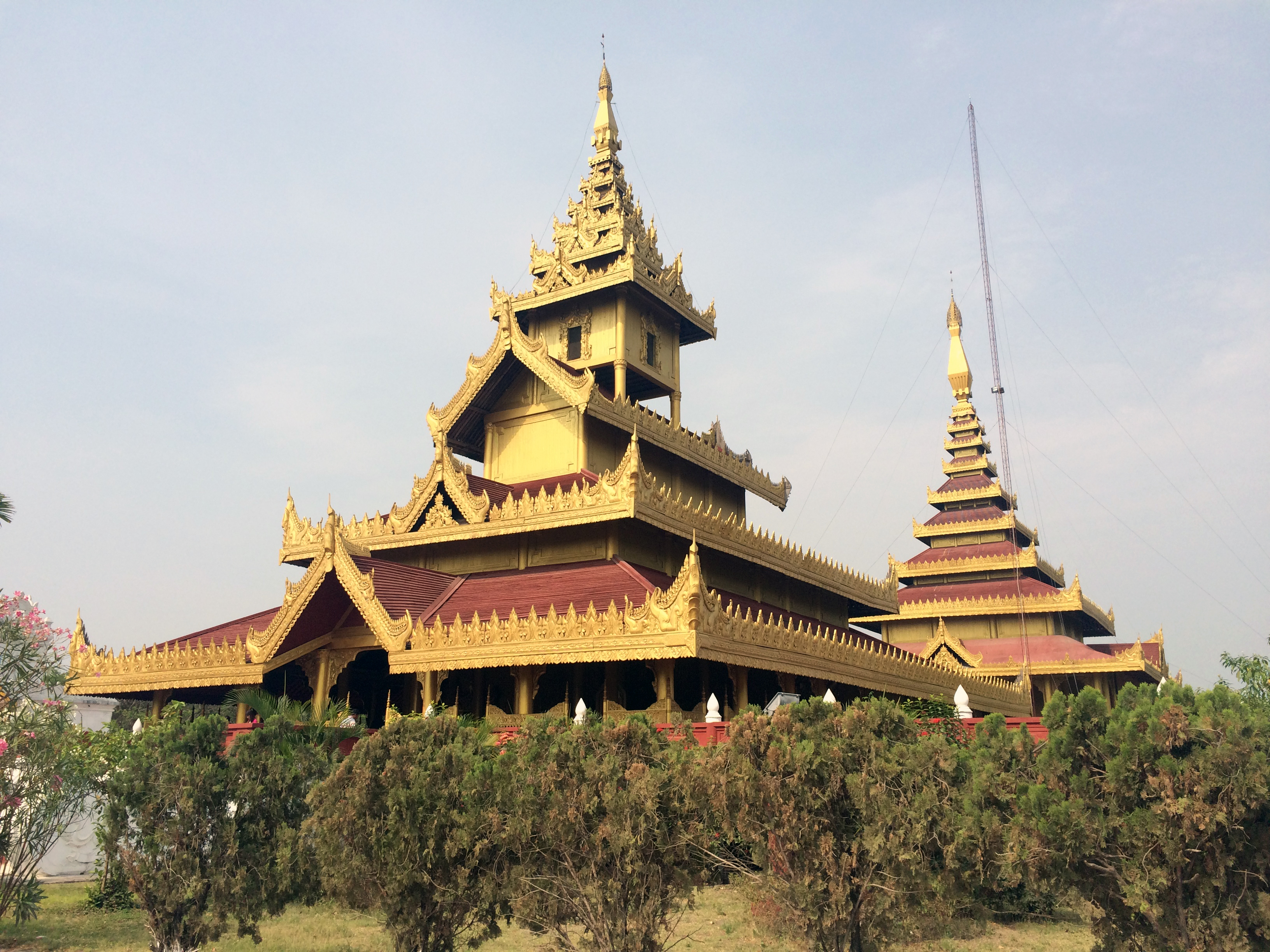
- Shwebo Palace

- Location in Burma
- Coordinates: 22°34′0″N 95°42′0″E
- Country: Myanmar
- Region: Sagaing Region
- District: Shwebo
- Founded: 29 February 1752

Population (2021)
  - Total: 88,914
  - Ethnicities: Burmans
  - Religions: Theravada Buddhism
- Time zone: UTC6:30 (MST)

Shwebo (Burmese: ရွှေဘိုမြို့ [ʃwèbò mjo̰]), also called Ratanāsiṅga or Ratanāsikhā ("Center of Treasure") in Pali, is a city in Sagaing Region, Burma, 110 km north-west of Mandalay between the Irrawaddy and the Mu rivers. The city was the origin of the Konbaung Dynasty, established by King Alaungpaya in 1752, that was the dominant political force in Burma after the mid-18th century. It served as Alaungpaya's capital from 1752 to 1760. As of 2021, it has a population of 88,914.

It is the site of Shwebo University and Shwebo Palace.

== History ==
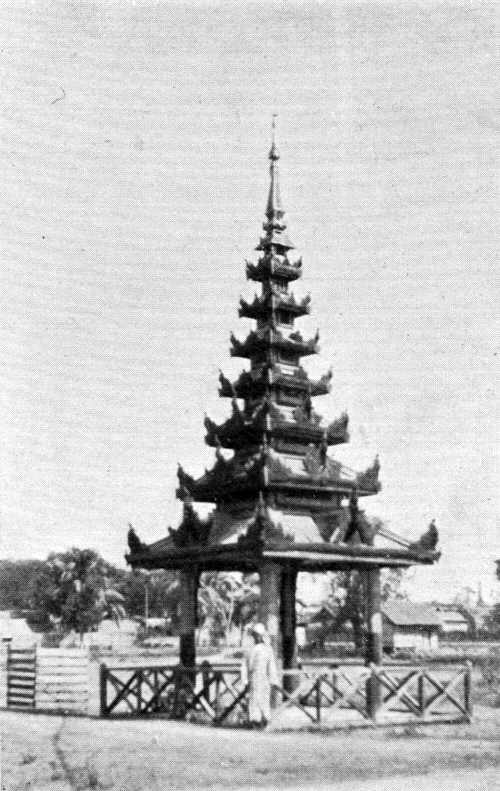
Alaungpaya's Tomb

Up to 1752, Shwebo was a village, called Moksobo (Burmese: မုဆိုးဘို [moʊʔ sʰó bò]; lit. 'Hunter Chief') of about 300 houses. It lies near the site of the ancient Pyu city-state of Hanlin. On 29 February 1752, the chief of the village Aung Zeya founded the Konbaung Dynasty to resist the upcoming invasion of Lower Burma-based Hanthawaddy forces. Aung Zeya, who also assumed the royal title of Alaungpaya, gained the allegiance of 46 surrounding villages, and organized defenses building a stockade and digging a moat around Moksobo. He renamed his village, Shwebo (lit. 'lit' or 'Golden Chief'). Over the next eight years, Alaungpaya led the reunification of Burma with Shwebo as his capital.

Shwebo lost its status as capital after Alaungpaya's death in 1760. The successor Naungdawgyi moved the capital to Sagaing closer to the Irrawaddy river. Nonetheless, Shwebo continued to be an important region throughout the Konbaung era (1752–1885), providing a disproportionate share of soldiers that served in Konbaung's armies. The region was usually held as an appanage by the most senior princes, usually the crown prince. It was to Shwebo that Prince of Mindon went in 1853 to raise the standard of rebellion in his successful bid to overthrow his half brother Pagan.

== Names of Shwebo ==
Shwebo is famous for its five names. Five titles had been conferred to the city namely:

1. Moksobo (မုဆိုးဘို, "Widower" or "Hunterham"), its original name as a village.
2. Ratanāsiṅga (Jewel-Horn) or Ratanāsikhā (Apex of Jewels), which was burmanized as Yadanaa-Thein-ga (ရတနာသိင်္ဃ, ratanāsiṅgha) and given the sense "Central Hub of Treasure".
3. Konbaung (ကုန်းဘောင်, "land-ridge" or "gangplank")
4. Yangyi-Aung (ရန်ကြီးအောင်,"Conquering A Great Foe"), and
5. Shwebo (ရွှေဘို,"Goldham"), its modern name.

Most of the people know the above names but the name "အယုဇ္ဈပူရ" (Ayujjhapura, "Unassailable") and "မြေဘုံသာ" (Myay-bhome-thaa, "Prosperous Land") are rarely known.

== Geography ==
=== Climate ===
Located in the “Dry Valley” in the rain shadow of the Arakan Mountains, Shwebo lies on the boundary between a tropical savanna climate (Köppen Aw) and a hot semi-arid climate (BSh). The city received 4.37 inches (111 mm) of rainfall on 19 October 2011. It was the record breaking rainfall within 24 hours of October for past 48 years. The previous record was 3.84 inches (98 mm) of 24 October 1993.

Climate data for Shwebo (1991–2020, extremes 2001-present)
| Month | Jan | Feb | Mar | Apr | May | Jun | Jul | Aug | Sep | Oct | Nov | Dec | Year |
|---|---|---|---|---|---|---|---|---|---|---|---|---|---|
| Record high °C (°F) | 36.0 (96.8) | 38.0 (100.4) | 42.0 (107.6) | 44.0 (111.2) | 45.0 (113.0) | 41.5 (106.7) | 39.0 (102.2) | 41.0 (105.8) | 39.0 (102.2) | 39.0 (102.2) | 36.0 (96.8) | 34.0 (93.2) | 45.0 (113.0) |
| Mean daily maximum °C (°F) | 29.4 (84.9) | 32.4 (90.3) | 35.9 (96.6) | 38.1 (100.6) | 36.5 (97.7) | 34.8 (94.6) | 34.5 (94.1) | 33.6 (92.5) | 33.3 (91.9) | 32.4 (90.3) | 31.1 (88.0) | 29.1 (84.4) | 33.4 (92.1) |
| Daily mean °C (°F) | 21.2 (70.2) | 23.8 (74.8) | 27.7 (81.9) | 30.9 (87.6) | 30.7 (87.3) | 30.0 (86.0) | 29.8 (85.6) | 29.2 (84.6) | 28.9 (84.0) | 27.6 (81.7) | 24.8 (76.6) | 21.7 (71.1) | 27.2 (81.0) |
| Mean daily minimum °C (°F) | 13.1 (55.6) | 15.3 (59.5) | 19.6 (67.3) | 23.7 (74.7) | 24.9 (76.8) | 25.1 (77.2) | 25.0 (77.0) | 24.8 (76.6) | 24.4 (75.9) | 22.8 (73.0) | 18.5 (65.3) | 14.3 (57.7) | 20.9 (69.6) |
| Record low °C (°F) | 9.0 (48.2) | 8.2 (46.8) | 13.0 (55.4) | 18.2 (64.8) | 19.0 (66.2) | 23.0 (73.4) | 21.0 (69.8) | 22.0 (71.6) | 22.0 (71.6) | 17.0 (62.6) | 14.0 (57.2) | 10.0 (50.0) | 8.2 (46.8) |
| Average precipitation mm (inches) | 2.9 (0.11) | 2.3 (0.09) | 6.2 (0.24) | 18.9 (0.74) | 101.5 (4.00) | 105.5 (4.15) | 88.8 (3.50) | 167.2 (6.58) | 159.3 (6.27) | 139.6 (5.50) | 20.5 (0.81) | 3.6 (0.14) | 816.3 (32.14) |
| Average precipitation days (≥ 1.0 mm) | 0.4 | 0.4 | 0.7 | 2.3 | 8.0 | 7.7 | 6.8 | 9.9 | 9.9 | 7.9 | 1.8 | 0.6 | 56.4 |
Source 1: World Meteorological Organization
Source 2: Norwegian Meteorological Institute (extremes)

== Transport ==
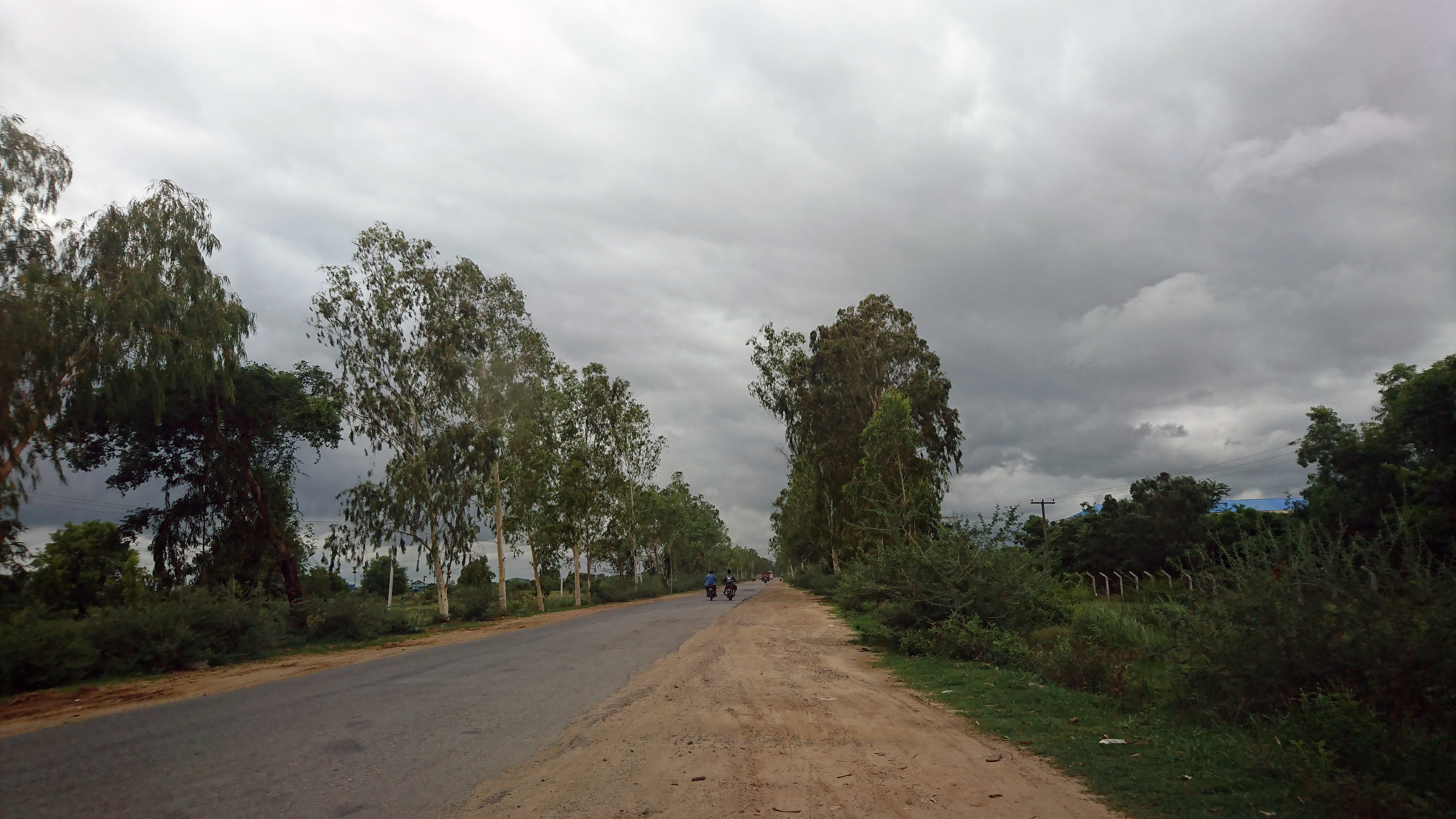
A view of Shwebo-Myitkyina Highway Road

Shwebo is served by Myanmar Railways's Mandalay-Myitkyina railway line.

== See also ==
- 2012 Shwebo earthquake
- Basic Education High School No. 3 Shwebo

Shwebo
| Preceded by Ava | Capital of Burma; 29 February 1752 – 26 July 1760 | Succeeded by Sagaing |
