= Maha Thiha Thura =

Burmese commander-in-chief

- မဟာသီဟသူရ
- Born: c. 1720s Mu valley, Kingdom of Burma
- Died: 23 February 1782; Saturday, 12th waxing of Tabaung 1143 ME; Ava, Kingdom of Burma
- Military career
- Allegiance: Konbaung Dynasty
- Branch: Royal Burmese Army
- Service years: 1752–1776
- Rank: Commander, General (1752–1768); Commander-in-chief (1768–1776)
- Conflicts: Konbaung–Hanthawaddy War (1752–1757); Burmese–Siamese War (1765–1767) (1765); Burmese–Siamese War (1775–1776); Sino-Burmese War (1765–1769); Manipuri Rebellion (1770)
- Other work: Minister (1776–1777); Chief Minister (1782)

Maha Thiha Thura (Note: Burmese: မဟာသီဟသူร; Burmese pronunciation: [məhà θìha̰θùja̰]; also spelled Maha Thihathura; known in Thai sources as Asæ wùn kī̂ (Thai: อะแซหวุ่นกี้)) (Pali: mahā sīha sūra ;d. 23 February 1782), personal name U Thaa (ဦးသာ), also known as Atheh Wun Jee (အသည်ဝန်ကြီး , "Minister of Commoners"), was commander-in-chief of the Burmese military from 1768 to 1776. Regarded as a brilliant military strategist, he is best known in Burmese history for defeating the Chinese invasions of Burma (1765–1769). He rose to be a top commander in the service of King Alaungpaya during the latter's reunification campaigns of Burma (1752–1759), and later commanded Burmese armies in Siam, Lan Na, Luang Prabang (Laos), and Manipur.

The well-respected general's support was sought after by kings. His support was crucial in securing the throne for Singu, his son-in-law, above the remaining sons of Alaungpaya. However, the general had a fallout with his son-in-law afterwards, and was pushed aside. In 1782, he was appointed Chief Minister by King Phaungka, who overthrew Singu. When Phaungka himself was overthrown six days later by Bodawpaya, the new king kept Maha Thiha Thura as his Chief Minister. However, the old general, who had so often led his countrymen to victory, and had won the greatest of their wars, was found plotting against the king, and was executed for treason.

== Background ==
The future general was born Maung Tha (မောင်သာ [màʊɴ θà]) in the present-day Shwebo District in the Mu valley (about 100 miles northwest of Ava) during the waning years of the Toungoo Dynasty. Tha grew up during the period in which the authority of King Mahadhammaraza Dipadi (r. 1733–1752) had largely dissipated across the kingdom. The Manipuris had regularly raided increasingly deeper parts of Upper Burma between the Chindwin and Irrawaddy rivers since the mid-1720s. Tha's home region was directly on the path of the raids, and took the brunt of the raids. With the Burmese court unable to deal with the small kingdom of Manipur, the Burmese watched helplessly as the raiders torched villages, ransacked pagodas, and taking away captives. In 1740, the Mon of Lower Burma broke away, and founded the Restored Hanthawaddy Kingdom. The central authority of the king had effectively disappeared, and a profound sense of helplessness pervaded and deepened. The Hanthawaddy armies finally toppled the Toungoo Dynasty in April 1752 when they captured Ava.

== Service ==
=== Early years (1752–1765) ===
Tha was part of "an exceptionally proud group of men and women" of Upper Burma who longed to redress the humiliations that their once proud kingdom had suffered from in the previous three decades. A few weeks before the fall of Ava, Tha like many young men in his home region responded to the call by Aung Zeya, the chief of Moksobo, to resist the invading armies. (Aung Zeya's resistance was just one of many disparate resistance armies that had sprung up throughout panicked Upper Burma.) Tha's home village was one of the 46 villages that joined the resistance led by Aung Zeya, who had now founded the Konbaung Dynasty and declared himself king, styled as Alaungpaya.

Tha quickly proved his ability in Alaungpaya's initial battles against the invading Hanthawaddy forces as well as a rival resistance army from Khin-U. He was chosen as one of 68 elite commanders that would become the core leadership of Konbaung armies for the next thirty years. He served with distinction throughout Alaungpaya's reunification campaigns, which by 1758 had reunited all of Burma, conquered Manipur, and driven out the French from Thanlyin and the British from Negrais.

After a dozen years of distinguished service, Maha Thiha Thura was one of the top commanders of Konbaung military, just a rung below the Sitke (commanders-in-chief) like Minhla Minkhaung Kyaw, Minkhaung Nawrahta, Ne Myo Thihapate, or Maha Nawrahta. In 1765, he served under Ne Myo Thihapate in yet another Burmese invasion of Siam. Thihapate's forces first conquered Lan Xang in the dry season of 1765. In December 1765, a Chinese force invaded Kengtung. Though the Burmese had repelled the invasion by April 1766, Thihapate posted Maha Thiha Thura at the Kenghung garrison (present-day Jinghong, Yunnan), then the easternmost Burmese territory, to guard the rear of the invasion force in Siam.

In late 1766, the Chinese forces again invaded for the second time. King Hsinbyushin ordered Maha Thiha Thura's army to cross the northern Shan states to meet the invasion force at the Bhamo-Kaungton corridor. His success in the Sino–Burmese War would immortalize him in Burmese history.

=== Sino-Burmese War (1766–1769) ===
==== Second invasion ====
When Maha Thiha Thura received the order to march to Bhamo, the Sino-Burmese war was already in its second year. The war had begun in 1765 as a border dispute. (The Qing Dynasty had annexed the borderlands, whose Shan sawbwas (chiefs) used to pay tribute to both kingdoms, in the 1730s. Starting in 1758, the Konbaung Dynasty reasserted the Burmese authority in the former borderlands.) Following the failure of the first invasion, however, it was no longer a border dispute to the Qianlong Emperor of China. He reportedly was so enraged by the first defeat that the second invasion was to place a Qing claimant on the Burmese throne.

Maha Thiha Thura's army urgently marched across the northern Shan states, and arrived at the Bhamo area in early 1767. Bhamo had been taken by the Chinese, who had proceeded to lay siege to the Burmese fortress at Kaungton, a few miles south. Maha Thiha Thura's army was part of the Burmese plan to encircle the Chinese forces. Circa April 1766, two Burmese armies led by Ne Myo Sithu and Balamindin, counter-attacked, forcing the Chinese troops to retreat eastwards and then northwards where Maha Thiha Thura's army was waiting. The two other Burmese armies also followed up, and the Chinese army was destroyed entirely.

Maha Thiha Thura along with other Burmese generals arrived back to Ava in early May 1767 and were received with honors.

==== Third invasion ====
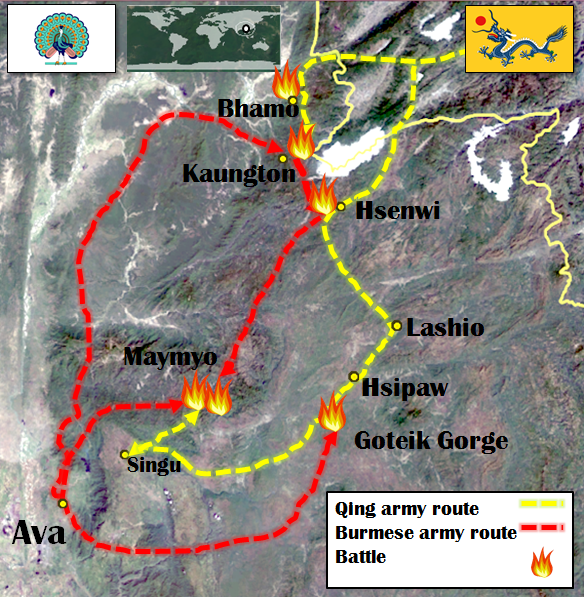
Main battle routes of the third invasion (1767–1768)

Later that year, in November, a far greater invasion force (50,000-strong), led by the elite Manchu Bannermen, invaded. Maha Thiha Thura was one of four commanders in charge of Burmese defenses— Maha Sithu (the overall commander), Ne Myo Sithu, and Balamindin. But the Burmese were unaware of the much bigger Chinese strength, and did not have the numbers to defend a much larger invasion force. (The main army of Maha Sithu had only about 7000 men.) Maha Thiha Thura's smaller army was assigned to attack Hsenwi, which the Qing had seized and now set up as a supply depot. In December, Maha Sithu's main army was crushed by the 15,000-strong Bannerman army commanded by Gen. Ming Rui (son-in-law of the emperor) at the battle of Goteik Gorge. Maha Thiha Thura's attempt to retake Hsenwi, defended by 5000 Bannermen, also failed.

After the failures, the Burmese armies switched to guerrilla warfare. Taking advantage of the Chinese unfamiliarity with the terrain, Maha Thiha Thura and his deputy commander Teingya Minkhaung, were particularly successful at disrupting Chinese supply and communication lines. Therefore, although Ming Rui's main army steamrolled through Burmese defenses all the way to Singu, just thirty miles north of Ava, its capability to proceed was seriously degraded by the lack of supplies. It also could not communicate with the northern invasion force, which could not overcome the Kaungton fort and eventually retreated back to Yunnan.

In early 1768, the Burmese forces, urgently recalled from Siam, began to arrive back. Bolstered by the reinforcements, two Burmese armies led by Maha Thiha Thura and Ne Myo Sithu finally succeeded in retaking Hsenwi. With this success, Maha Thiha Thura was now given the overall command of a 12,000 strong army to drive out Ming Rui's once 30,000 strong army. (By then, the Bannerman army was no longer in top form, having already lost thousands to tropical diseases and many more suffering from starvation.) In what would become known as the Battle of Maymyo, Maha Thiha Thura successfully encircled the retreating Chinese forces at modern-day Pyinoolwin (Maymyo). The entire Chinese army was wiped out after three days of intense fighting. About 2500 were taken in as prisoners of war. Only a few dozen made it back to Yunnan. Gen. Ming Rui could have escaped with that small group but committed suicide instead. (The Battle of Maymyo is now a military case study of infantry warfare against a larger army.)

==== Fourth invasion ====
At Beijing, the Qianlong Emperor was shocked at the defeat of his Bannerman army. But he felt compelled to proceed as the imperial prestige was at stake. He appointed Ming Rui's uncle, the chief grand councilor Fuheng, as the next governor of Yunnan. The Burmese now fully expected another major invasion, and had redeployed most of their forces from Siam to the Chinese front. Maha Thiha Thura was the commander-in-chief of the entire Burmese defenses consisted of three armies and a flotilla. His plan was to stop the enemy at the border, and prevent another Chinese penetration into their heartland.

In October 1769, Fuheng launched the largest invasion yet, with a Bannerman-led army of 60,000. Better prepared Burmese defenses successfully held the Chinese at the border. By early December, the Chinese forces were completely encircled by rings of Burmese troops. The Chinese command, which had already lost 20,000 men, and a quantity of arms and ammunition, asked for terms. The Burmese commanders were averse to granting terms, saying that the Chinese were surrounded like cattle in a pen, they were starving, and in a few days, they could be wiped out to a man. Maha Thiha Thura, who led the annihilation of Ming Rui's army, realized that another wipe-out would merely stiffen the resolve of the Chinese government.

He pointed out to his commanders that war with the Chinese was quickly becoming a cancer that would finally destroy the nation. Compared to Chinese losses, Burmese losses were light but considered in proportion to the population, they were heavy.

==== Truce ====
The commanders were not convinced but Maha Thiha Thura, on his own responsibility, and without informing the king, demanded that the Chinese agree to the following terms:

1. The Chinese would surrender all the sawbwas and other rebels and fugitives from Burmese justice who had taken shelter in Chinese territory;
2. The Chinese would undertake to respect Burmese sovereignty over those Shan states that had been historically part of Burma;
3. All prisoners of war would be released;
4. The emperor of China and the king of Burma would resume friendly relations, regularly exchanging embassies bearing letters of good will and presents.

The Chinese commanders decided to agree to the terms, probably because they had no other choice. At Kaungton, on 13 December 1769 (or 22 December 1769), under a 7-roofed pyathat hall, 14 Burmese and 13 Chinese officers signed a peace treaty. The Chinese burned their boats and melted down their cannon. Two days later, the Chinese withdrew.

=== Manipur (1770) ===
At Ava, Hsinbyushin was furious that his generals had acted without his knowledge, and tore up his copy of the treaty. Knowing that the king was angry, the Burmese armies were afraid to return to the capital. In January 1770, they marched to Manipur where a rebellion had begun, taking advantage of Burmese troubles with the Chinese. After a three days' battle near Langthabal, the Manipuris were defeated, and their raja fled to Assam. The Burmese raised their nominee to the throne, and returned. The king's anger had subsided; after all, they had won victories and preserved his throne. Still, the king sent Maha Thiha Thura, the decorated general, whose daughter was married to Hsinbyushin's son and heir-apparent Singu, a woman's dress to wear, and exiled him and other generals to the Shan states for a month.

=== Siam (1775–1776) ===
In 1774, a rebellion flared up in Lan Na mainly due to the repressive rule of the Burmese governor there, Thado Mindin. His contemptuous treatment of the local chiefs earned him their indignation. Three of the local chiefs fled to Siam to join the Siamese which now had designs on Lan Na itself. Backed by local Lan Na, the Siamese took Chiang Mai in late 1774. Hsinbyushin, who had been in a long illness that would eventually take his life, now ordered Maha Thiha Thura to lead a fresh invasion of Siam.

==== Preparations ====
But much had changed since the last invasion of Siam ten years ago. The king was dying, and the palace of full of rumors and intrigues. None of the Burmese commanders, including Maha Thiha Thura, were enthusiastic about the invasion. Maha Thiha Thura himself had a vested interest in the succession affairs as the heir-apparent Singu was his son-in-law. More importantly, the Burmese military command broke down. Dissension was rampant. Field commanders increasingly acted like warlords and behaved with arrogance towards the people, and began to ignore even the king's orders. Maha Thiha Thura faced many difficulties in raising an invasion force, and had to wait until the end of rainy season in 1775 to start the invasion.

==== Invasion ====
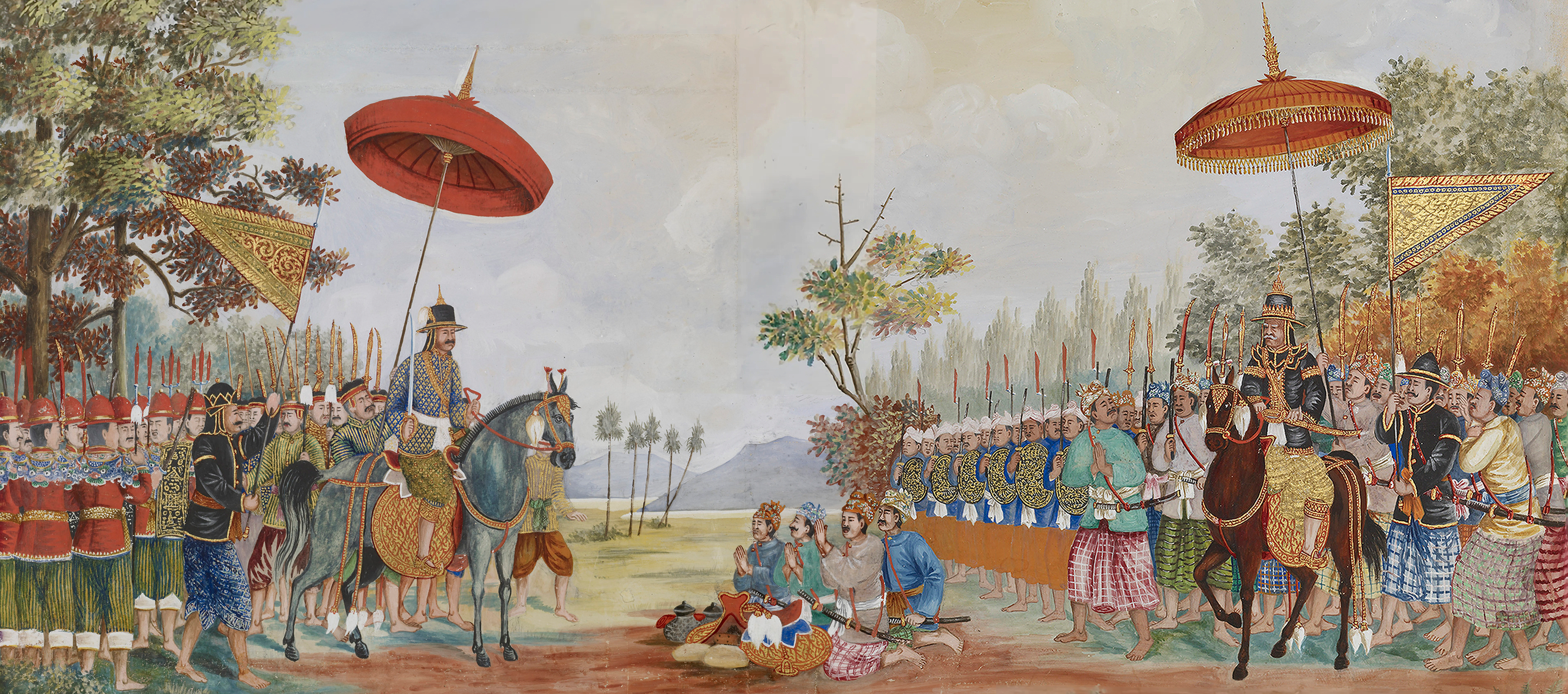
The painting depicts the meeting of Maha Thiha Thura (right) and his army to Chao Phraya Chakri (Thongduang, later King Buddha Yodfa Chulalok or Rama I of Rattanakosin Kingdom), a Siamese general (left) during the siege of Phitsanulok in December 1775.

A combined force of 35,000 was eventually raised for the Siamese theater. Maha Thiha Thura's main army invaded by the southern route from Martaban, and Ne Myo Thihapate's army from Chiang Saen in northern Lan Na, (which was still under Burmese control). From the start, the invasion was fraught with multiple issues. First, the invasion force of 35000 was too small to be effective whereas the 1765 invasion force consisted of at least 50,000 troops. More importantly, the Burmese command was in disarray. With the king on his deathbed, insubordination became increasingly rampant. Indeed, the second-in-command of the southern army, Zeya Kyaw, disagreed with Maha Thiha Thura on the invasion route, withdrew with his troops, leaving Maha Thiha Thura with a portion of the troops. (This kind of insubordination would have been unimaginable only a couple of years back when the king was in full control. Amazingly, Zeya Kyaw was never punished after the war.)

Even with a full-strength invasion force, an invasion of Siam was never easy for the Burmese. Without a full strength army, the effort appeared doomed from the start. Nonetheless, Maha Thiha Thura still obeyed the orders, and marched on. He somehow fought his way through tough Siamese defenses led by king Taksin and his deputy Chakri, and managed to occupy Phitsanulok and Sukhothai provinces in northern Siam (present-day central Thailand). From there he tried to fight his way down south the new Siamese capital of Bangkok but could not break the Siamese defenses. In one battle, the Burmese general was thoroughly impressed by the fierce resistance put up by Chakri's forces. Although he eventually won that particular battle, Maha Thiha Thura sent a message to Chakri to come and receive his congratulations in an hour of truce. Trusting him, the Siamese general appeared. Maha Thiha Thura offered his congratulations, remarking:

"You have bearing of a king. Perhaps you will be king one day".

By June, at the start of the rainy season, the war was in a stalemate, and prospects of another conquest of Siam looked bleak. When Hsinbyushin finally died on June 10, Maha Thiha Thura decided to call off the invasion. He wanted to ensure that his son-in-law and heir-apparent Singu succeed the throne. The withdrawal's long-term impact was that the Burmese would lose most of the old Lan Na Kingdom, which had been under Burmese suzerainty since 1558. The Burmese still retained Chiang Saen, a region in northern Lan Na but they would lose that in Bodawpaya's disastrous invasion of Siam (1785–1786).

== King-maker ==
Maha Thiha Thura rushed back in support of his son-in-law because Singu's right to succession was in direct conflict with Alaungpaya's edict that all of his sons become king in the order of seniority. Despite the fact that four of his brothers were still alive, Hsinbyushin had ignored his father's will, and made his eldest son Singu the heir apparent. With Maha Thiha Thura's backing, Singu ascended the throne without incident. The new king killed off potential rivals to the throne as soon as he came to power. He had three of his half-brothers executed in 1776 upon his ascension. He next executed his uncle Prince of Amyint on 1 October 1777. He exiled the three remaining uncles. Prince of Badon (later King Bodawpaya) was next in line for the throne—Hence Singu's next target—but the astute prince conducted himself to be seen as harmless that he escaped death. Prince of Badon was sent to Sagaing where he was kept under close supervision.

In a turn of events, Singu had a major fallout with Maha Thiha Thura, the man who made him king. The general was stripped of his office of Wungyi (Minister), and sent to exile to Sagaing. Singu divorced the general's daughter in May 1777, and had her drowned in 1778. Embittered, Maha Thiha Thura now looked for a substitute to take the throne. In February 1782, Phaungkaza Maung Maung, the eldest son of King Naungdawgyi seized the throne, and made Maha Thiha Thura his Chief Minister. Together, they recalled Alaungpaya's surviving sons from exile and placed them under arrest. The fourth son, Bodawpaya escaped from prison with the help of some commanders, and seized the throne. Maung Maung's reign lasted all of six days.

== Death ==
Bodawpaya tried to win over the old king-maker by confirming his appointment as Chief Minister. But Maha Thiha Thura could not tolerate Bodawpaya because he was too strong a king. A few months later, Bodawpaya found his brother Sitha plotting against him, and among the faction was none other than Maha Thiha Thura himself. The shock to the king's faith was such that never again to the end of his life, did he put his trust in mortal man, not even his nearest kin; from that time onward, he changed his room and his bed daily. All the faction, with their families and attendants were executed. The old general who had so often led his countrymen to victory, and had won the greatest of their wars, died the death of a traitor.

== Legacy ==
Maha Thiha Thura is remembered by the Burmese as one of their greatest military leaders. His able leadership secured a victory from the brink of defeat against a much larger enemy in the Sino-Burmese War. His strategy to encircle the much larger Chinese army at the Battle of Maymyo has been called a "master stroke" by military historians. But he was more than a brilliant military strategist. He had the foresight to see that a long war with the Chinese would destroy the kingdom. Against the advice of his staff, he took the responsibility to make peace with the trapped Chinese in 1769 although the easier option would have been to wipe out the Chinese, and receive the acclamations of the king and people. Instead he took the punishment of the king. Historian Htin Aung writes: "...posterity must praise him not only for his wisdom but also for his selflessness".
