= Battle of Maymyo =

Final battle of the Third Qing Invasion of Burma

Coordinates: 22°02′N 96°28′E

- Part of the Sino-Burmese War (1765–1769)
Date	March 1768
Location	near Pyinoolwin, Kingdom of Burma
Result	Decisive Burmese victory

Belligerents
Konbaung dynasty	(Qing dynasty) Qing Empire

Commanders and leaders
(Konbaung dynasty) Maha Thiha Thura (Konbaung dynasty) Maha Sithu	(Qing dynasty) Ming Rui †

Strength
10,000 infantry 2,000 cavalry	30,000 infantry and cavalry

Casualties and losses
Minimal	~20,000 killed, wounded or executed ~some 5,000 men escaped ~2,500 captured

Battle of Maymyo (Chinese: 小孟育战役), fought in March 1768, was the final battle and the end of the Third Qing Invasion of Burma during the Sino-Burmese War (1765–69). In November 1767, the Qianlong Emperor ordered the Third Invasion under the command of his nephew Mingrui, with a 50,000-strong invasion force led by the Manchu Bannermen, after the failure of the Green Standard Army and Yunnan Border troops in the earlier invasions. They were the most successful of the invasions, penetrating deep into central Burma and defeating the main Burmese army at the Battle of Goteik Gorge. However, Mingrui ended up overstretching his lines by the time he reached Ava. Burmese reinforcements arrived from Siam and began cutting the Qing supply lines. Hounded by Burmese guerrilla attacks, his men suffering from tropical diseases, and with no hope of being reinforced, Mingrui was forced to retreat. The Burmese army under Maha Thiha Thura caught up with him at Maymyo, modern-day Pyinoolwin, and all but wiped out the invasion force with the exception of a few survivors.

== Campaign background ==
The Qing army's plans were to use a pincer action on the Burmese capital of Ava with the main army of 30,000 under Ming Rui invading through Hsenwi, Lashio, and Hsipaw and down the Namtu river, with the smaller one, around 15,000 under General E'erdeng'e, invading through Bhamo. The remaining Qing troops were left behind at Hsenwi to guard the supply lines. After defeating the main Burmese army at the Battle of Goteik Gorge, Ming Rui's forces raced to Ava, mopping any resistance. However, Burmese guerrilla attacks under General Teingya Minkhaung on the long supply lines began to hamper the Qing army's ability to proceed. By the time they reached Ava, the Qing main army had overstretched itself and Ming Rui was forced on the defensive, playing for time to enable the northern army to come to his relief. However, the northern army had severely weakened itself during their repeated assaults on the Kaungton fort. Against orders, the northern force retreated back to Yunnan.

By early 1768, veteran Burmese troops had returned from the Siamese theatre and Generals Maha Thiha Thura and Ne Myo Sithu succeeded in retaking the Qing supply base at Hsenwi. Completely cut off from all supplies, the Bannermen from the freezing grasslands along the Russian border, began dying of malaria as well as guerrilla attacks in the burning weather of central Burma. Ming Rui abandoned all hope of taking Ava and attempted to retreat back to China with as many men as he could.

In March, the Qing began their retreat, stalked by a Burmese army of 10,000 men and 2000 cavalry under Maha Thiha Thura, who had been promoted to overall command. The Burmese divided into two forces, a smaller army led by Maha Sithu continued to pursue Ming Rui, while the larger army led by Maha Thiha Thura advanced through the mountainous route to cut off the Qing army.

== Battle ==
The smaller Burmese army under Maha Sithu engaged the Qing forces head-on and was repulsed by the superior Chinese numbers. However Sithu, instead of retreating, pulled a number of troops, particularly archers and musketeers, into the jungle and began harassing the Qing's flanks and ambushing foraging parties. While Mingrui was occupied with Sithu's army, Thiha Thura's larger force successfully moved through the mountains to arrive directly behind the Qing army and managed to achieve complete encirclement of the Qing main army.

Over the next three days of hard fighting, the Burmese whittled away the larger but weakened and starving Chinese army. The desperate Qing troops attempted to break the encirclement through Sithu's smaller army but the Burmese infantry stood firm and held off the Chinese assaults. Trapped between Sithu's infantry in front, under arrow and musket fire from the flanks, and charged by Thiha Thura's army from the rear, the Qing army was eventually wiped out. Historian Harvey said that the Burmese could hardly grip their swords with their hilts so slippery with enemy blood.

== Aftermath ==
Aside from some 2500 men captured, the entire Qing army was completely wiped out. Mingrui was severely wounded and a small group of Qing soldiers managed to break through. Although he could have escaped, Mingrui cut off his queue and sent it to the emperor as a token of his loyalty and then hanged himself on a tree.

The Qianlong Emperor had assumed an easy victory, so when then the news finally came, the Emperor was shocked. Desperate to redeem the humiliation, an even larger army invaded in 1769 under chief grand councilor Fuheng. This invasion, too, failed, bogged down at the frontier.

But Maha Thiha Thura, who oversaw the annihilation of Ming Rui's army at the battle of Maymyo, correctly realized that another wipe-out would merely stiffen the resolve of the Chinese government. Furthermore, Burmese losses, while small compared to China, were heavy in comparison to its smaller population. Taking full responsibility, Thiha Thura forced the Qing commanders to take terms without informing the king and oversaw their retreat back to Yunnan.
