= Battle of Syriam (1755-1756) =

1755–1756 battle in Burma

- Part of Konbaung–Hanthawaddy War
Date	May 1755 – 26 July 1756
Location	Syriam, Burma
Result	Konbaung victory
Territorial changes	Konbaung capture of Syriam

Belligerents
Konbaung dynasty	Restored Hanthawaddy Kingdom

Commanders and leaders
Alaungpaya; Naungdawgyi; Hsinbyushin; Minhla Minkhaung Kyaw †	Sieur de Bruno; Hanthawaddy garrison commander

The Battle of Syriam was a battle fought between May 1755 and 26 July 1756 at Syriam, Burma, between the Konbaung dynasty and the Restored Hanthawaddy Kingdom.

The Konbaung dynasty tried to capture Syriam in May 1755 but failed. Konbaung forces under Alaungpaya besieged the city and maintained the siege for more than a year before launching a final assault on 25–26 July 1756. The city was captured by the Konbaung dynasty, which resulted in the control of the rest of the region and end of French involvement in the Burmese Civil War.

== Background ==
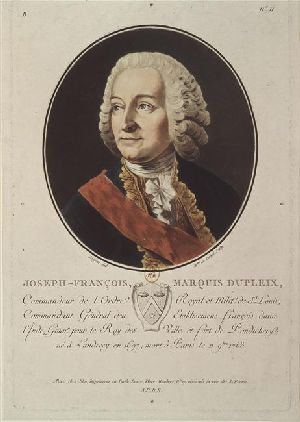
Joseph François Dupleix who initiated French intervention in Burma

The fortified port of Syriam was guarded by Hanthawaddy troops, aided by the French personnel and arms. Konbaung armies' first attempt to take the city in May 1755 was a failure. Its sturdy walls and modern cannon made difficult any attempt to storm the fortress. In June, Hanthawaddy launched a counter-offensive, attacking the Konbaung stronghold at Yangon. During this time, the Konbaung and the British East India Company under Captain George Baker had been in negotiations, and the British in both Negrais and in Syriam had declared for Alaungpaya. While the British settlements agreed to side with the Konbaung forces, three British ships—the East India Company ships Arcot, Hunter, and Elizabeth—joined the Hanthawaddy forces, apparently without orders by their superiors. The counterattack was unsuccessful. The British, fearing reprisals by Alaungpaya, now speedily sent Captain Baker to Alaungpaya at Shwebo with presents of cannon and muskets and with orders to conclude a friendship.

Although Alaungpaya was becoming deeply suspicious of British intentions, he also needed to secure modern arms against French-defended Syriam. He agreed that the British could stay at their settlement at Negrais, which they had occupied since 1753, but postponed signing any immediate treaty with the company. Instead, he proposed an alliance between the two countries. The British who were about to enter the Seven Years' War against the French seemed like natural allies. Despite what Alaungpaya regarded as a magnanimous gesture over Negrais no direct military help of any kind materialized.

== Siege ==
Konbaung troops would now have to take Syriam the hard way. The siege continued for the remainder of 1755. The French inside were desperate for reinforcements from their India headquarters at Pondicherry. Alaungpaya returned to the front in January 1756 with his two sons, Naungdawgyi and Hsinbyushin. In July, Alaungpaya launched another attack by water and by land, capturing the only French ship left at the port, and the French factory at the outskirts of the town. On 14 July 1756 (3rd waning of Waso 1118 ME), Minhla Minkhaung Kyaw, the chief of musket corps and top Konbaung general, was severely wounded by cannon fire. As Minhla Minkhaung Kyaw lay dying of his wounds and being brought back by boat, the king went down to the boat himself to see his old childhood friend, who had won him many battles. The king publicly mourned the death of his chief general and honored him with a funeral under a white umbrella before the whole army.The leader of the French, Sieur de Bruno, secretly tried to negotiate with Alaungpaya, but was found out and put in prison by Hanthawaddy commanders. The siege went on.

== Final assault ==
For Alaungpaya, the worry was that French reinforcements would soon arrive. He decided that the time had come for the fortress to be stormed, now. He knew that the French and the Mons, expecting no quarter, would resist fiercely and that hundreds of his men would die in any attempt to breach the walls. He called for volunteers and then selected 93, whom he named the Golden Company of Syriam, a name that would find pride of place in Burmese nationalist mythology. They included guards, officers, and royal descendants of Bayinnaung. The afternoon before, as the early monsoon rains poured down in torrents outside the makeshift huts, they ate together in their king's presence. Alaungpaya gave each a leather helmet and lacquer armor.

That evening, on 25 July 1756, as the Konbaung troops banged their drums and played loud music to encourage Syriam's defenders into thinking festivities were underway and to relax their watch, the Golden Company scaled the walls. At the dawn of 26 July 1756, after bloody hand-to-hand fighting they managed to pry open the great wooden gates, and in darkness, amid the war cries of the Konbaung troops ("Shwebotha!" "Shwebotha!"; lit. natives of Shwebo) and the screams of the women and the children inside, the city was overrun. The Hanthawaddy commander barely escaped the carnage. Alaungpaya presented the stacks of gold and silver captured from the city to the surviving 20 men of the Golden Company and the families of the 73 who died.

== Aftermath ==
A few days later and a few days too late, on 29 July 1756, two French relief ships, the Galatee and the Fleury arrived, loaded with troops as well as arms, ammunition, and food from Pondicherry. The Burmese seized the ships and press-ganged 200 French officers and soldiers into Alaungpaya's army. Also on board were 35 ship's guns, five field guns, and 1300 muskets. It was a considerable haul. More importantly, the battle ended French involvement in the Burmese civil war.
