= Sino-Burmese War =

Qing dynasty war of expansion (1765 - 1769)

Sino-Burmese War (1765–1769)
- Part of the Ten Great Campaigns
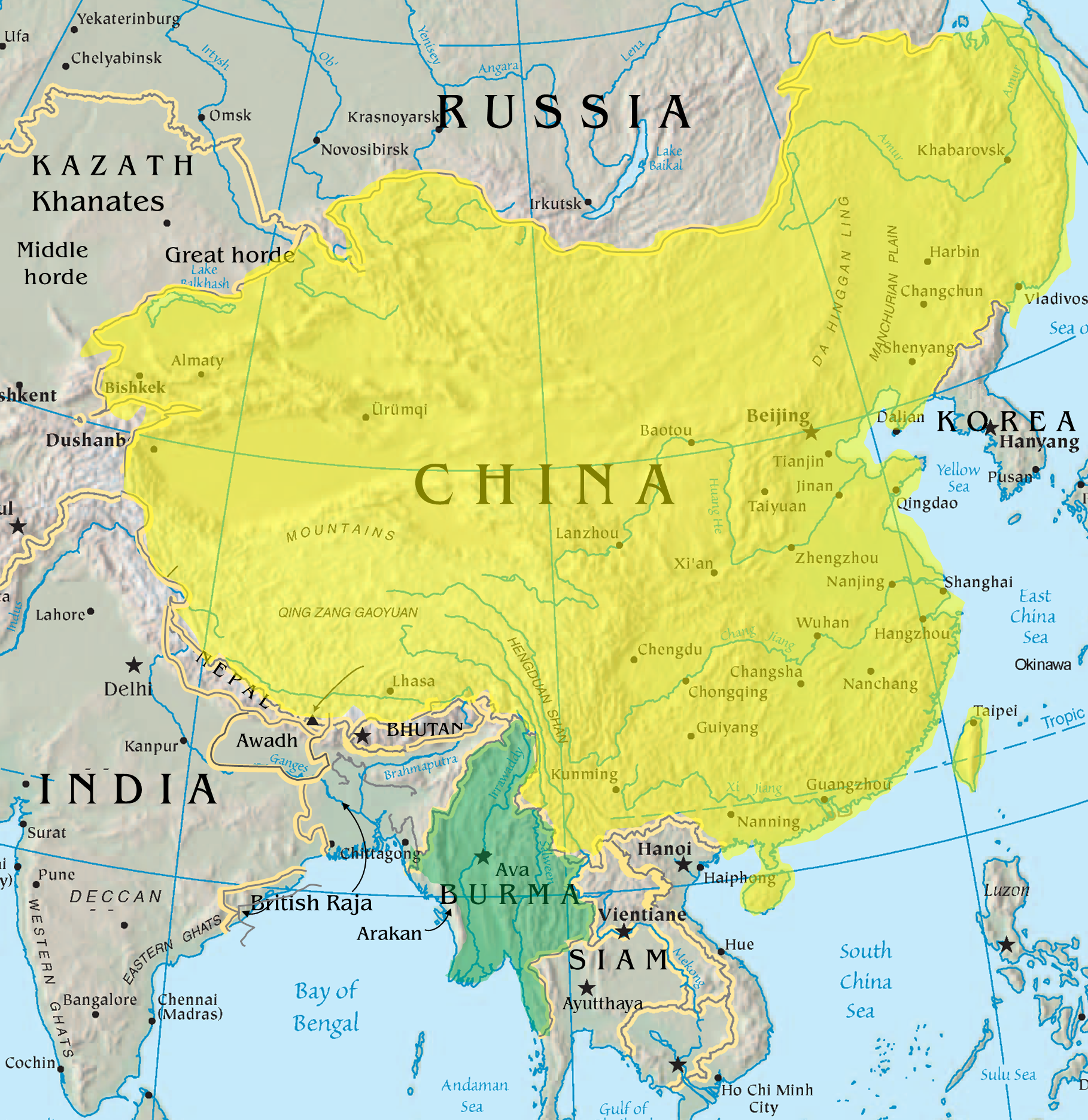
- Burma and China prior to the war (1765)
Date	December 1765 – 22 December 1769
Location	Modern-day Shan State, Kachin State, Yunnan, Upper Burma
Result	Burmese tributary missions to the Qing resumed in 1788: Burmese withdrawal from Siam; Tactical Burmese victory; Treaty of Kaungton (1769)

Belligerents
(Qing dynasty) Qing Dynasty Co-belligerent: (Note: Siam was a co-belligerent from 1765 to 1767.); Siam	Burma

Commanders and leaders
Qianlong Emperor; Liu Zao; Yang Yingju (executed); Mingrui †; E'erdeng'e (executed); Aligui †; Fuheng (WIA); Arigūn; Agui; Ekkathat †; Taksin	Hsinbyushin; Maha Thiha Thura; Maha Sithu; Ne Sithu; Balamindin; Teingya Minkhaung; Pierre de Milard

Units involved
Eight Banners Army; Green Standard Army; Mongols; Tai-Shan militias Royal Siamese Army	Royal Burmese Army
- Bamar and Shan levies (Note: Employed by both sides in each of the four campaigns.)

Strength
First campaign: 6,000 (Note: 5,000 soldiers and 1,000 cavalry.) (Note: (Burney 1840, pp. 171–173); from Burmese sources; figures adjusted down by one magnitude per G.E. Harvey's analysis in his History of Burma (1925) in the section Numerical Note (pp. 333–335).): 3,500 Green Standard; Tai-Shan militias; Second campaign: 27,500 (Note: 25,000 soldiers and 2,500 cavalry.); 14,000 Green Standard; Tai-Shan militias; Third campaign: 70,000; 30,000 bannermen and Mongols; 12,000 Green Standard; Tai-Shan militias; Fourth campaign: 60,000 (Htin Aung) (Note: Htin Aung describes a force assembled at the frontier in late 1769. The Draft History of Qing reports 31,000 land and naval troops, with 13,000 remaining when withdrawal was ordered.); 40,000 Bannermen; 20,000 Green Standard and Tai-Shan militias	First campaign: 2,500 (Note: 2,000 soldiers, 200 cavalry, and 300 Shan militiamen.); Second campaign: 10,000; 4,500 foot, 200 horse (RBA)Shan national archer army(400); Kaungton garrison; Third campaign: ~32,000 (Note: ~30,000 foot soldiers and 2,000 cavalry) (Note: ~20,000 at the beginning, plus an additional 10,000 men and 2,000 cavalry towards the end); Fourth campaign: (Burmese claim) 70,000 (Note: (Burney 1840, pp. 180–181) and (Harvey 1925, pp. 333–335). Burney citing Burmese sources gives the Chinese strength as 500,000-foot and 50,000 cavalry and states the Burmese strength to be 64,000-foot and 1,200 cavalry. These numbers are certainly exaggerated. Per Harvey (pp. 333–335), the Burmese numbers should be reduced by an order of magnitude, which gives the Chinese strength as about 55,000, which is in line with the 60,000 figure from Chinese sources. Moreover, the Burmese figure of ~65,000 was also exaggerated though probably not by a factor of 10. Per Harvey's analysis, the most the Konbaung kings could’ve raised was 60,000, even that in the early 19th century, when they had a larger empire than Hsinbyushin's. Hsinbyushin couldn’t have raised 60,000, since Burma had been at war since 1740 and many able men had already died. The most he could’ve raised was 40,000.); (Harvey): 30,000 infantry; 3,000 cavalry; 200 elephants.

Casualties and losses
- Second campaign: ~20,000; Third campaign: 30,000+ (Note: The number is derived from the fact that only a few dozen of the 30,000 strong main army managed to return to Yunnan. (See e.g. (Myint-U 2006, pp. 102–103).) This figure does not include casualties suffered by the northern army.); Fourth campaign: 20,000+ Total: 70,000+ 2,500 captured

The Sino-Burmese War (Chinese: 清緬戰爭; Burmese: တရုတ်-မြန်မာ စစ်ပွဲများ), also known as the Qing invasions of Burma or the Myanmar campaign of the Qing dynasty, was a war fought between the Qing dynasty of China and the Konbaung dynasty of Burma (Myanmar). The Qing under the Qianlong Emperor launched four invasions of Burma between 1765 and 1769, which were considered one of his Ten Great Campaigns. Nonetheless, the war, which claimed the lives of over 70,000 Qing soldiers and four commanders, is sometimes described as "the most disastrous frontier war that the Qing dynasty had ever waged", and one that "assured Burmese independence". Burma's successful defense laid the foundation for the present-day boundary between the two countries.

At first, the Qing emperor envisaged an easy war, and sent in only the Green Standard Army troops stationed in Yunnan. The Qing invasion came as the majority of Burmese forces were deployed in their latest invasion of Siam. Nonetheless, battle-hardened Burmese troops defeated the first two invasions of 1765–1766 and 1766–1767 at the border. The regional conflict now escalated to a major war that involved military maneuvers nationwide in both countries. The third invasion (1767–1768) led by the elite Manchu Bannermen nearly succeeded, penetrating deep into central Burma within a few days' march from the capital, Ava (Inwa). But the bannermen of northern China could not cope with unfamiliar tropical terrains and lethal endemic diseases, and were driven back with heavy losses. After the close call, King Hsinbyushin redeployed his armies from Siam to the Chinese front. The fourth and largest invasion got bogged down at the frontier. With the Qing forces completely encircled, a truce was reached between the field commanders of the two sides in December 1769.

The Qing kept a heavy military lineup in the border areas of Yunnan for about one decade in an attempt to wage another war while imposing a ban on inter-border trade for two decades. The Burmese, too, were preoccupied with the Chinese threat, and kept a series of garrisons along the border. When Burmese tributary missions to the Qing resumed in 1788, the Qing unilaterally viewed the act as Burmese submission, and claimed victory. Ultimately, the main beneficiaries of this war were the Siamese, who reclaimed most of their territories in the next three years after having lost their capital Ayutthaya to the Burmese in 1767.

== Background ==
Topography of Shan State, where major campaigns took place

The long border between Burma and China had long been vaguely defined. The Ming dynasty first conquered Yunnan borderlands between 1380 and 1388, and stamped out local resistance by the mid-1440s. The Burmese control of the Shan States (which covered the present-day Kachin State, Shan State and Kayah State) came in 1557 when King Bayinnaung of the Toungoo dynasty conquered all of the Shan States. The border was never demarcated in the modern sense, with local Shan sawbwas (chiefs) at the border regions paying tribute to both sides. The situation turned to China's favor in the 1730s when the Qing dynasty decided to impose a tighter control of Yunnan's border regions while the Burmese authority largely dissipated with the rapid decline of the Toungoo dynasty.

=== Qing consolidation of borderlands (1730s) ===
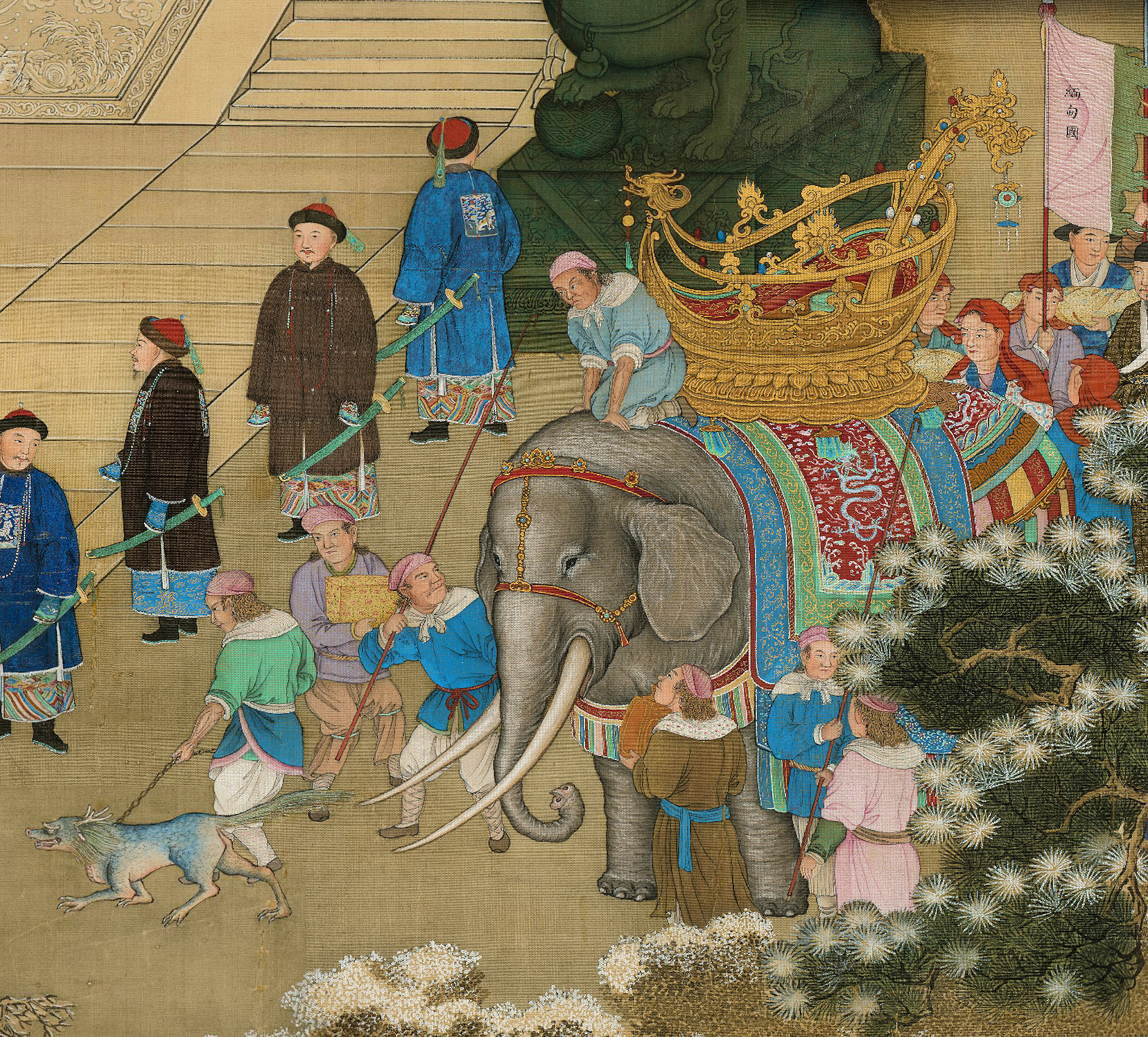
Myanmar (缅甸国) delegates in Peking in 1761, at the time of the Qianlong Emperor. 万国来朝图

The Qing attempts for tighter control of the border were initially met with fierce resistance by the local chiefs. In 1732, the Yunnan government's demand of higher taxes led to several Shan revolts at the border. Shan resistance leaders united people by saying "The lands and water are our properties. We could plow ourselves and eat our own produces. There is not a need to pay tributes to foreign government". In July 1732, a Shan army, mostly consisted of native mountaineers, laid siege to the Qing garrison at Pu'er for 90 days. The Yunnan government responded with an overwhelming force numbered around 5,000 and lifted the siege. The Qing army pursued further west but could not put down persistent local resistance. Finally, the Qing field commanders changed their tactics by allying with neutral sawbwas, granting them Qing titles and powers, including Green Standard captainships and regional commanderships. To complete the agreements, the third ranking officer of Yunnan traveled to Simao personally and held a ceremony of allegiance. By the mid-1730s, the sawbwas of the border who used to pay dual tributes, were increasingly siding with the more powerful Qing. By 1735, the year which the Qianlong Emperor ascended the Chinese throne, ten sawbwas had sided with the Qing. The annexed border states ranged from Mogaung and Bhamo in present-day Kachin State to Hsenwi State (Theinni) and Kengtung State (Kyaingtong) in present-day Shan State to Sipsongpanna (Kyaingyun) in present-day Xishuangbanna Dai Autonomous Prefecture, Yunnan.

While the Qing were consolidating their hold at the border, the Toungoo dynasty was faced with multiple external raids and internal rebellions and could not take any reciprocal action. Throughout the 1730s, the dynasty faced Manipuri raids that reached increasingly deeper parts of Upper Burma. In 1740, the Mon of Lower Burma revolted and founded the Restored Hanthawaddy Kingdom. By the mid-1740s, the authority of the Burmese king had largely dissipated. In 1752, the Toungoo dynasty was toppled by the forces of the Restored Hanthawaddy Kingdom which captured Ava.

By then, the Qing control of the former borderlands was unquestioned. In 1752, the Emperor issued a manuscript, Qing Imperial Illustration of Tributaries, saying that all "barbarian" tribes under his rule must be studied and reported their natures and cultures back to Beijing.

=== Burmese reassertion (1750s–1760s) ===
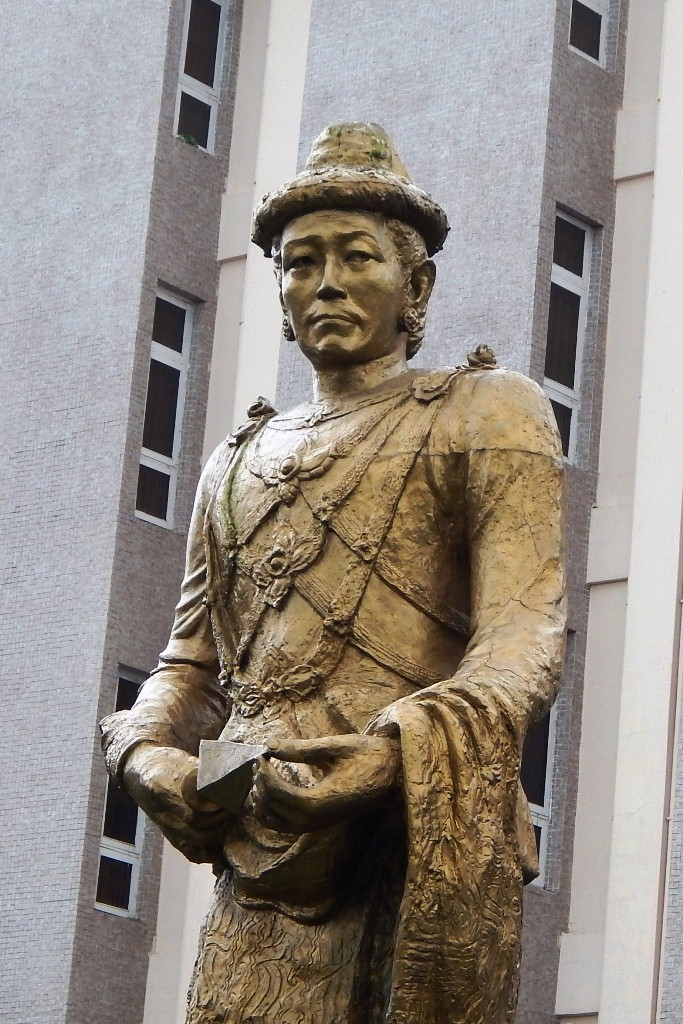
Alaungpaya

In 1752, a new dynasty called Konbaung rose to challenge Restored Hanthawaddy Kingdom, and went on to reunite much of the kingdom by 1758. In 1758–59, King Alaungpaya, the founder of the dynasty, sent an expedition to the farther Shan States (present-day Kachin State and northern and eastern Shan State), which had been annexed by the Qing over two decades earlier, to reestablish Burmese authority. (Nearer Shan States had been reacquired since 1754). Three of the ten farther Shan state sawbwas (Mogaung, Bhamo, Hsenwi) and their militias reportedly ran away into Yunnan and tried to persuade Qing officials to invade Burma. The nephew of Kengtung sawbwa and his followers also fled.

The Yunnan government reported the news to the Emperor in 1759, and the Qing court promptly issued an imperial edict ordering reconquest. At first, the Yunnan officials, who believed that "barbarians must be conquered using barbarians", tried to resolve the matter by supporting the defected sawbwas. But the strategy did not work. In 1764, a Burmese army, which was on its way to Siam, was increasing its grip of the borderlands, and the sawbwas complained to China. In response, the Emperor appointed Liu Zao, a respected scholarly minister from the capital to sort out the matters. At Kunming, Liu assessed that the use of Tai-Shan militias alone was not working, and that he needed to commit regular Green Standard Army troops.

== First invasion (1765–1766) ==
Ava army in a 19th-century painting

In early 1765, a 20,000-strong Burmese army stationed at Kengtung, led by General Ne Myo Thihapate, left Kengtung for yet another Burmese invasion of Siam. With the main Burmese army gone, Liu Zao used a few minor trade disputes between local Chinese and Burmese merchants as the excuse to order an invasion of Kengtung in December 1765. The invasion force, which consisted of 3,500 Green Standard Army troops along with Tai-Shan militias, laid siege to Kengtung but could not match battle-hardened Burmese troops at the Kengtung garrison, led by General Ne Myo Sithu. The Burmese lifted the siege and pursued the invaders into Pu'er Prefecture, and defeated them there. Ne Myo Sithu left a reinforced garrison, and returned to Ava in April 1766.

Governor Liu, in his embarrassment, first tried to conceal what had happened. When the Emperor became suspicious, he ordered Liu's immediate recall and demotion. Instead of complying, Liu committed suicide by slicing his throat with a stationery knife, writing as blood was pouring from his neck: "There is no way to pay back the emperor's favor. I deserve death with my crime". While this kind of suicide in the face of bureaucratic failure apparently was not unusual in Qing China, it reportedly enraged the Emperor nonetheless. Sorting out the Mien (the Chinese word for "Burmese") was now a matter of imperial prestige. The Emperor now appointed Yang Yingju, an experienced frontier officer with long service in Xinjiang and Guangzhou.

== Second invasion (1766–1767) ==
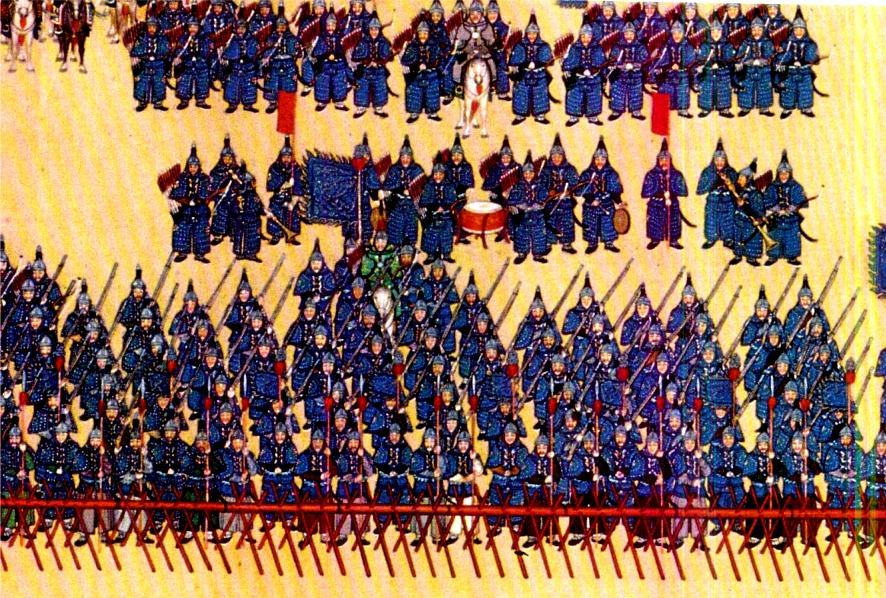
The Qianlong Emperor's bannermen

Yang Yingju arrived in the summer of 1766 to take command. Unlike the invasion of Liu Zao in Kengtung, which was located far away from the Burmese heartland, Yang was determined to strike Upper Burma directly. He reportedly planned to place a Qing claimant on the Burmese throne. Yang's planned path of invasion was via Bhamo and down the Irrawaddy River to Ava. The Burmese knew the route of invasion in advance, and were prepared. Hsinbyushin's plan was to lure the Chinese into Burmese territory, and then surround them. The Burmese commander in the field Balamindin was ordered to give up Bhamo, and instead stay at the Burmese stockade at Kaungton, a few miles south of Bhamo on the Irrawaddy. The Kaungton fort had been especially equipped with the cannon corps led by French gunners (captured at the battle of Thanlyin in 1756). To reinforce them, another army led by Maha Thiha Thura and posted at the easternmost Burmese garrison at Kenghung (present-day Jinghong, Yunnan), was ordered to march to the Bhamo theater across the northern Shan states.

=== Trap at Bhamo–Kaungton ===
As planned, the Qing troops easily captured Bhamo in December 1766, and established a supply base. The Chinese then proceeded to lay siege to the Burmese garrison at Kaungton. But Balamindin's defenses held off repeated Chinese assaults. Meanwhile, two Burmese armies, one led by Maha Sithu, and another led by Ne Myo Sithu, surrounded the Chinese. Maha Thiha Thura's army also arrived and took position near Bhamo to block the escape route back to Yunnan.

The impasse did not favor the Chinese troops who were utterly unprepared to fight in the tropical weather of Upper Burma. Thousands of Chinese soldiers reportedly were struck down by cholera, dysentery, and malaria. One Qing report stated that 800 out of 1,000 soldiers in one garrison had died of disease, and that another 100 were ill.

With the Chinese army greatly weakened, the Burmese then launched their offensive. First, Ne Myo Sithu easily retook the lightly held Bhamo. The main Chinese army was now totally holed up in the Kaungton-Bhamo corridor, cut off from all supplies. The Burmese then proceeded to attack the main Chinese army from two sides— Balamindin's army out of Kaungton fort, and Ne Myo Sithu's army from the north. The Chinese retreated eastwards and then northwards where another Burmese army led by Maha Thiha Thura was waiting. The two other Burmese armies also followed up, and the Chinese army was destroyed entirely. Maha Sithu's army which had been guarding the western flank of the Irrawaddy River, then marched north of Myitkyina and defeated other lightly held Chinese garrisons at the border. The Burmese armies proceeded to occupy eight Chinese Shan states within Yunnan.

=== Aftermath ===
Victorious Burmese armies returned to Ava with the captured guns, muskets and prisoners in early May. At Kunming, Yang Yingju began resorting to lies. He reported that Bhamo had been occupied; that its inhabitants had begun wearing Manchu-style pigtails; and that the Burmese commander, Ne Myo Sithu, after losing 10,000 men had sued for peace. He recommended that the emperor graciously accept the peace offer to restore the normal trade relations between the two countries. The Qianlong Emperor however realized the falsity of the report, and ordered Yang back to Beijing. On his arrival, Yang committed suicide at the order of the Emperor.

== Third invasion (1767–1768) ==
=== Chinese mobilization ===
After the two defeats, the Qing emperor and his court could not comprehend how a relatively small country like Burma could resist the might of the Qing. For the Emperor, it was time for the Manchus themselves to come into the picture. He had always doubted the battle-worthiness of his Chinese Green Standard armies. The Manchus saw themselves as a warlike and conquering race and the Chinese as an occupied people. He commissioned a study of the first two invasions, and the report reinforced his biases—that the low battle-worthiness of the Green Standard armies was the reason for the failures.

In 1767, the Emperor appointed the veteran Manchu commander Ming Rui, a son-in-law of his, as governor-general of Yunnan and Guizhou, and head of the Burma campaign. Ming Rui had seen battle against Turkic peoples in the northwest and was in command of the strategically key post of Ili (in present-day Xinjiang). His appointment meant that this was no longer a border dispute but a full-fledged war. Ming Rui arrived in Yunnan in April. An invasion force consisting of Mongol and elite Manchu troops rushed down from northern China and Manchuria. Thousands of Green Standards from Yunnan and Tai-Shan militias accompanied this force. Provinces throughout China were mobilized to provide supplies. The total strength of the invasion force was 50,000 men, the vast majority being infantry. The mountains and thick jungles of Burma kept the use of cavalry forces to a minimum. The Qing court now seriously considered the threat of illnesses among its troops; as a precaution, the campaign was planned for the winter months when diseases were believed to be less prevalent.

=== Burmese mobilization ===
The Burmese now faced the largest Chinese army yet mobilized against them. Yet King Hsinbyushin did not seem to realize the gravity of the situation. Throughout the first two invasions, he had steadfastly refused to recall the main Burmese armies, which had been battling in Laos and Siam since January 1765, and laying siege to the Siamese capital of Ayutthaya since January 1766. Throughout 1767, when the Chinese were mobilizing for their most serious invasion yet, the Burmese were still focused on defeating the Siamese. Even after the Siamese capital was finally captured in April 1767, Hsinbyushin kept part of the troops in Siam during the rainy season months in order to mop up the remaining Siamese resistance during the winter months later that year. He actually allowed many Shan and Laotian battalions to demobilize at the start of the rainy season.

As a result, when the invasion did come in November 1767, the Burmese defenses had not been upgraded to meet a much larger and a more determined foe. The Burmese command looked much like that of the second invasion. Hsinbyushin again assigned the same commanders of the second invasion to face off against the Chinese. Maha Sithu led the main Burmese army, and was the overall commander of the Chinese theater, with Maha Thiha Thura and Ne Myo Sithu commanding two other Burmese armies. Balamindin again commanded the Kaungton fort. Given that the main Burmese army was only about 7,000 strong, the entire Burmese defense at the start of the third invasion was most likely no more than 20,000.

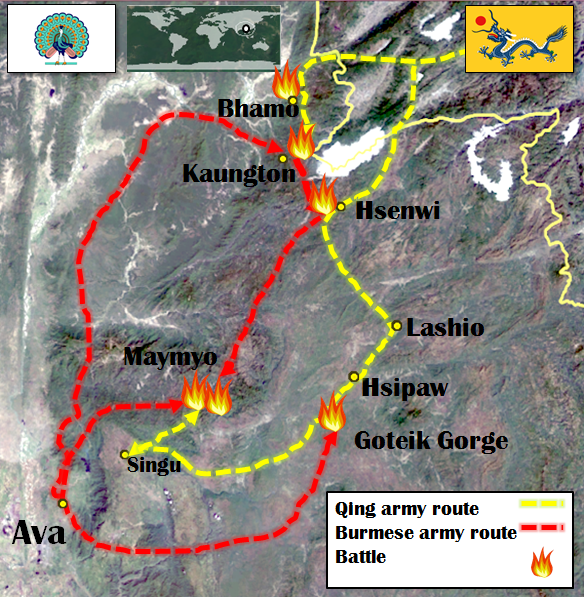
Main battle routes of the third invasion (1767–1768)

=== Chinese offensive ===
Ming Rui planned a two-pronged invasion as soon as the rainy season ended. The main Chinese army, led by Ming Rui himself, was to approach Ava through Hsenwi, Lashio and Hsipaw, and down the Namtu River. The main invasion route was the same route followed by the Manchu forces a century earlier, chasing the Yongli Emperor of the Southern Ming dynasty. The second army, led by General E'erdeng'e (額爾登額, or possibly 額爾景額) was to try the Bhamo route again. The ultimate objective was for both armies to clamp themselves in a pincer action on the Burmese capital of Ava. The Burmese plan was to hold the second Chinese army in the north at Kaungton with the army led by Ne Myo Sithu, and meet the main Chinese army in the northeast with two armies led by Maha Sithu and Maha Thiha Thura.

At first, everything went according to plan for the Qing. The third invasion began in November 1767 as the smaller Chinese army attacked and occupied Bhamo. Within eight days, Ming Rui's main army occupied the Shan states of Hsenwi and Hsipaw. Ming Rui made Hsenwi a supply base, and assigned 5,000 troops to remain at Hsenwi and guard the rear. He then led a 15,000-strong army in the direction of Ava. In late December, at the Goteik Gorge (south of Hsipaw), the two main armies faced off and the first major battle of the third invasion ensued. Outnumbered two-to-one, Maha Sithu's main Burmese army was thoroughly routed by Ming Rui's Bannermen. Maha Thiha Thura too was repulsed at Hsenwi. The news of the disaster at the Goteik Gorge reached Ava. King Hsinbyushin finally realized the gravity of the situation, and urgently recalled Burmese armies from Siam.

Having smashed through the main Burmese army, Ming Rui pressed on full-steam ahead, overrunning one town after another, and reached Singu on the Irrawaddy River, 30 miles north of Ava at the beginning of 1768. The only bright spot for the Burmese was that the northern invasion force, which was to come down the Irrawaddy to join up with Ming Rui's main army, had been held off at Kaungton.

=== Burmese counter-attack ===
Ava

At Ava, King Hsinbyushin famously did not panic at the prospect of a large Chinese army, numbering around 30,000 men at his doorstep. The court urged the king to flee, but he scornfully refused, saying he and his brother princes, sons of Alaungpaya, would fight the Chinese single-handed if they had to. Instead of defending the capital, Hsinbyushin calmly sent an army to take up position outside Singu, personally leading his men toward the front line.

It turned out that Ming Rui had overstretched himself, and was in no position to proceed any farther. He was now too far away from his main supply base at Hsenwi, hundreds of miles away in the northern Shan Hills. The Burmese guerrilla attacks on the long supply lines across the jungles of the Shan Hills were seriously hampering the Qing army's ability to proceed. Burmese guerrilla operations were directed by General Teingya Minkhaung, a deputy of Maha Thiha Thura. Ming Rui now resorted to defensive tactics, playing for time to enable the northern army to come to his relief. But it was not to be. The northern army had suffered heavy casualties in their repeated attacks against the Kaungton fort. Its commander E'erdeng'e, against the express orders of Ming Rui, retreated back to Yunnan. The commander was later publicly shamed and executed (sliced to death) on the orders of the Emperor.

The situation turned worse for Ming Rui. By early 1768, battle-hardened Burmese reinforcements from Siam had begun to arrive back. Bolstered by the reinforcements, two Burmese armies led by Maha Thiha Thura and Ne Myo Sithu succeeded in retaking Hsenwi. The Qing commander at Hsenwi committed suicide. The main Qing army was now cut off from all supplies. It was now March 1768. Thousands of Bannermen from the freezing grasslands along the Russian border, began dying of malaria as well as Burmese attacks in the furnace-like hot weather of central Burma. Ming Rui gave up all hope of proceeding toward Ava, and instead tried to make it back to Yunnan with as many of his soldiers as possible.

==== Battle of Maymyo ====
In March 1768, Ming Rui began his retreat, pursued by a Burmese army of 10,000 infantry and 2,000 cavalry. The Burmese then tried to encircle the Chinese by splitting the army into two. Maha Thiha Thura had now assumed the overall command, replacing Maha Sithu. The smaller army, led by Maha Sithu, continued to pursue Ming Rui while the larger army led by Maha Thiha Thura advanced through the mountainous route to emerge directly behind the Chinese. Through careful maneuvering, the Burmese managed to achieve complete encirclement of the Chinese at modern-day Pyin Oo Lwin (Maymyo), about 50 miles northeast of Ava. Over the course of three days of bloody fighting at the Battle of Maymyo, the Bannerman army was completely annihilated. The slaughter was such that the Burmese could hardly grip their swords as the hilts were slippery with enemy blood. Of the original 30,000 men of the main army, only 2,500 of then remained alive and were captured. The rest had been killed either on the battlefield, through disease or through execution after their surrender. Ming Rui himself was severely wounded in battle. Only a small group managed to break through and escaped the carnage. Ming Rui himself could have escaped with that group. Instead, he cut off his queue and sent it to the Emperor as a token of his loyalty by those who were escaping. He then hanged himself on a tree. In the end, only a few dozen of the main army returned.

== Fourth invasion (1769) ==
=== Intermission (1768–1769) ===
The Qianlong Emperor had sent Ming Rui and his Bannermen assuming an easy victory. He had begun making plans about how he would administer his newest territory. For weeks, the Qing court had heard nothing, and then the news finally came. The Emperor was shocked and ordered an immediate halt to all military actions until he could decide what next to do. Generals returning from the front line cautioned that there was no way Burma could be conquered. But there was no real choice but to press on. Imperial prestige was at stake.

The Emperor turned to one of his most trusted advisers, the chief grand councilor Fuheng, Ming Rui's uncle. Back in the 1750s, Fuheng had been one of the few senior officials who had fully backed the Emperor's decision to eliminate the Dzungars at a time when most believed that war was too risky. On 14 April 1768, the imperial court announced the death of Ming Rui and the appointment of Fuheng as the new chief commander of the Burma campaign. Manchu generals Agui, Aligun and Suhede were appointed as his deputies. Now, the top rung of the Qing military establishment prepared for a final showdown with the Burmese.

Before any fighting resumed, some on the Chinese side sent out peace feelers to the court of Ava. The Burmese also sent signals that they would like to give diplomacy a chance, given their preoccupations in Siam. But the Emperor, with Fuheng's encouragement, made it clear that no compromise with the Burmese could be made. The dignity of the state demanded a full surrender. His aim was to establish direct Qing rule over all Burmese possessions. Emissaries were sent to Siam and Laotian states informing them of the Chinese ambition and seeking an alliance.

Ava now fully expected another major invasion. King Hsinbyushin had now brought most of the troops back from Siam to face the Chinese. With the Burmese fully preoccupied with the Chinese threat, the Siamese resistance retook Ayutthaya Kingdom in 1768 and went on to reconquer all of their territories throughout 1768 and 1769. For the Burmese, their hard-fought gains of the prior three years (1765–1767) in Siam had gone to waste but there was little they could do. The survival of their kingdom was now at stake.

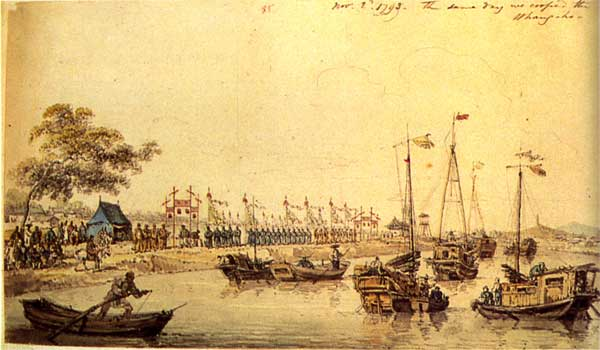
Qing flotilla

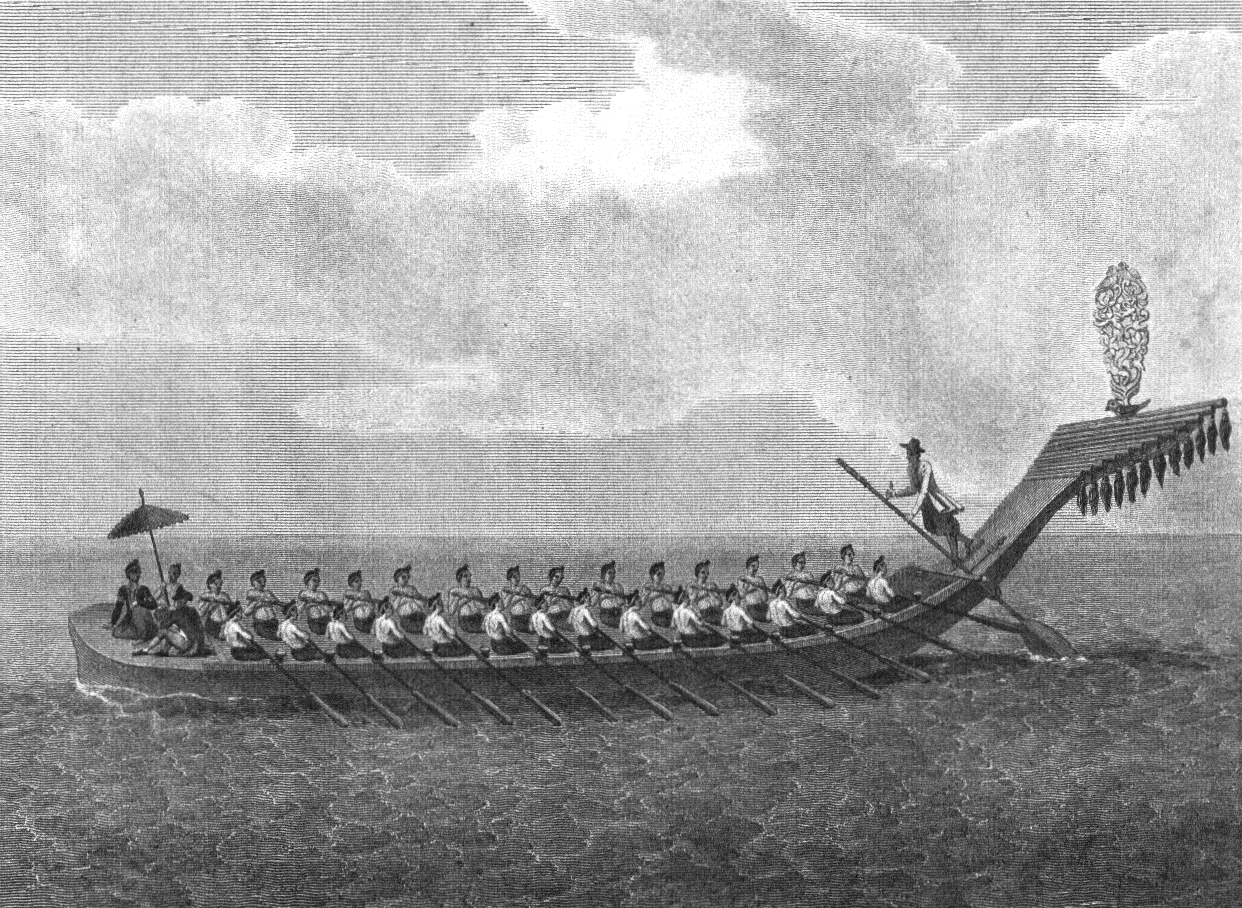
A Burmese war boat on the Irrawaddy River

=== Chinese battle plan ===
Fuheng arrived in Yunnan in April, 1769 to take command of a 60,000-strong force. He studied past Ming and Mongol expeditions to form his battle plan, which called for a three-pronged invasion via Bhamo and the Irrawaddy River. The first army would attack Bhamo and Kaungton head-on, which he knew would be difficult. But two other larger armies would bypass Kaungton and march down the Irrawaddy, one on each bank of the river, to Ava. The twin invading armies on each side of the river would be accompanied by war boats manned by thousands of sailors from the Fujian navy. To avoid a repeat of Ming Rui's mistake, he was determined to guard his supply and communication lines, and advance at a sustainable pace. He avoided an invasion route through the jungles of the Shan Hills so as to minimize the Burmese guerrilla attacks on his supply lines. He also brought in a full regiment of carpenters who would build fortresses and boats along the invasion route.

=== Burmese battle plan ===
For the Burmese, the overall objective was to stop the enemy at the border, and prevent another Chinese penetration into their heartland. Maha Thiha Thura was the overall commander, the role which he had assumed since the second half of the third invasion. As usual, Balamindin commanded the Kaungton fort. In the last week of September, three Burmese armies were dispatched to meet the three Chinese armies head-on. A fourth army was organized with the sole purpose of cutting the enemy supply lines. King Hsinbyushin had also organized a flotilla of war boats to meet the Chinese war boats. The Burmese defenses now included French musketeers and gunners under the command of Pierre de Milard, governor of Tabe, who had arrived back from the Siamese theater. Based on their troop movements, the Burmese knew at least the general direction from where the massive invasion force would come. Maha Thiha Thura moved upriver by boat toward Bhamo.

=== Invasion ===
As the Burmese armies marched north, Fuheng, against the advice of his officers, decided not to wait until the end of the monsoon season. It clearly was a calculated gamble; he had wanted to strike before the Burmese arrived but he had also hoped that "miasma would not be everywhere." So in October 1769, towards the end of (but still during) the monsoon season, Fuheng launched the largest invasion yet. The three Chinese armies jointly attacked and captured Bhamo. They proceeded south and built a massive fortress near Shwenyaungbin village, 12 miles east of the Burmese fortress at Kaungton. As planned, the carpenters duly built hundreds of war boats to sail down the Irrawaddy.

But almost nothing went according to plan. One army did cross over to the western bank of the Irrawaddy, as planned. But the commander of that army did not want to march far away from the base. When the Burmese army assigned to guard the west bank approached, the Chinese retreated back to the east bank. Likewise, the army assigned to march down the eastern bank also did not proceed. This left the Chinese flotilla exposed. The Burmese flotilla came up the river and attacked and sank all the Chinese boats. The Chinese armies now converged on attacking Kaungton. But for four consecutive weeks, the Burmese put up a remarkable defense, withstanding gallant charges by the Bannermen to scale the walls.

A little over a month into the invasion, the entire Qing invasion force was bogged down at the border. Predictably, many Chinese soldiers and sailors fell ill, and began to die in large numbers. Fuheng himself was struck down by fever. More ominously for the Chinese, the Burmese army sent to cut the enemy line of communication also achieved its purpose, and closed in on the Chinese armies from the rear. By early December, the Chinese forces were completely encircled. The Burmese armies then attacked the Chinese fort at Shwenyaungbin, which fell after a fierce battle. The fleeing Chinese troops fell back into the pocket near Kaungton where other Chinese forces were stationed. The Chinese armies were now trapped inside the corridor between the Shwenyaungbin and Kaungton forts, completely surrounded by rings of Burmese forces.

=== Truce ===
Military Minister Fuheng

The Chinese command, which had already lost 20,000 men, and a quantity of arms and ammunition, now asked for terms. The Burmese staff were averse to granting terms, saying that the Chinese were surrounded like cattle in a pen, they were starving, and in a few days, they could be wiped out to a man. But Maha Thiha Thura, who oversaw the annihilation of Ming Rui's army at the Battle of Maymyo in 1768, realized that another wipe-out would merely stiffen the resolve of the Chinese government.

Maha Thiha Thura was said to have said:

Comrades, unless we make peace, yet another invasion will come. And when we have defeated it, yet another will come. Our nation cannot go on just repelling invasion after invasion of the Chinese for we have other things to do. Let us stop the slaughter, and let their people and our people live in peace.

He pointed out to his commanders that war with the Chinese was quickly becoming a cancer that would finally destroy the nation. Burmese losses were lighter than Chinese losses, but heavy in proportion to Burma's population. In Htin Aung's account, the commanders were not convinced but Maha Thiha Thura, on his own responsibility, and without informing the king, demanded that the Chinese agree to the following terms:

1. The Chinese would surrender all the sawbwas and other rebels and fugitives from Burmese justice who had taken shelter in Chinese territory;
2. The Chinese would undertake to respect Burmese sovereignty over those Shan states that had been historically part of Burma;
3. All prisoners of war would be released;
4. The emperor of China and the king of Burma would resume friendly relations, regularly exchanging embassies bearing letters of good will and presents.

According to Htin Aung, the Chinese commanders accepted these terms. At Kaungton, on 13 December 1769 (or 22 December 1769), under a 7-roofed pyathat hall, 14 Burmese and 13 Chinese officers signed a peace treaty (known as the Treaty of Kaungton). The Chinese burned their boats and melted down their cannon. Two days later, as the Burmese stood to arms and looked down, starved Chinese soldiers marched sullenly away up the Taping River valley; they began to perish of hunger by thousands in the passes.

The Draft History of Qing also records a letter from the Burmese ruler requesting a cessation of hostilities. Zhou and Grabowsky describe continuing disagreement over the frontier tusi after the truce. They note that Qianlong bestowed the seals of Hsenwi and Bhamo on the Burmese king in 1788, while continuing to regard the territories as indirectly subordinate to the Qing through Burma.

== Aftermath ==
At Beijing, the Qianlong Emperor was not pleased with the treaty. He did not accept the Chinese commanders' explanation that the fourth stipulation—exchange of embassies bearing presents—amounted to Burmese submission and tribute. He did not permit the surrender of the sawbwas or other fugitives nor the resumption of trade between the two countries.

At Ava, King Hsinbyushin was furious that his generals had acted without his knowledge, and tore up his copy of the treaty. Knowing that the king was angry, the Burmese armies were afraid to return to the capital. In January 1770, they marched to Manipur where a rebellion had begun, taking advantage of Burmese troubles with the Chinese. After a three days' battle near Langthabal, the Manipuris were defeated, and their raja fled to Assam. The Burmese raised their nominee to the throne and returned. The king's anger had subsided; after all, they had won victories and preserved his throne. Still, the king sent Maha Thiha Thura, the decorated general, whose daughter was married to Hsinbyushin's son and heir-apparent Singu, a woman's dress to wear, and exiled him and other generals to the Shan states. He would not allow them to see him. He also exiled ministers who dared to speak on their behalf.

Although hostilities ceased, an uneasy truce ensued. None of the points in the treaty was honored by both sides. Because the Chinese did not return the sawbwas, the Burmese did not return the 2,500 Chinese prisoners of war, who were resettled. The Qing had lost some of the generation's most important frontier experts, including Yang Yingju, Ming Rui, Aligun, and Fuheng (who eventually died of malaria in 1770). The war cost the Qing treasury 9.8 million silver taels. Nonetheless, the Emperor kept a heavy military lineup in the border areas of Yunnan for about one decade in an attempt to wage another war while imposing a ban on inter-border trade for two decades.

The Burmese for years were preoccupied with another impending invasion by the Chinese, and kept a series of garrisons along the border. The high casualties of the war (in terms of the population size) and the ongoing need to guard the northern border seriously hampered the Burmese military's capability to renew warfare in Siam. It would be another five years when the Burmese sent another invasion force to Siam.

Contacts between the Qing and Burmese courts resumed in 1788. The resumption was brokered by the Tai-Shan nobles and Yunnan officials who wanted to see trade resume. To the Burmese, then under King Bodawpaya, the resumption was on equal terms, and they considered the exchange of presents as part of diplomatic etiquette, not as tribute. To the Chinese however, all of these diplomatic missions were considered tributary missions. The Emperor viewed the resumption of relations as Burmese submission, and unilaterally claimed victory and included the Burma campaign in his list of Ten Great Campaigns. In 1790, Qianlong invested Bodawpaya as King of Burma.

== Significance ==
=== Territorial changes ===
Burma's successful defense laid the foundation for the present-day boundary between the two countries. The border still was not demarcated, and the borderlands were still overlapping spheres of influence. After the war, Burma remained in possession of Koshanpye, the nine states above Bhamo. At least down to the eve of the First Anglo-Burmese War in 1824, the Burmese exerted authority over the southern Yunnan borderlands, as far as Kenghung (present-day Jinghong, Yunnan). But, Chiang Huang (Jinghong) of southern Yunnan remained as authority of Burma until British occupied the whole Burma in 1886. Likewise, the Chinese exercised a degree of control over the borderlands, including present-day northeastern Kachin State. Overall, the Burmese were able to push back the line of control up to one that existed before the Qing consolidation drive of the 1730s.

However, the war also forced the Burmese to withdraw from Siam. Their victory over the Qing is described as a moral victory. Historian G.E. Harvey writes: "Their other victories were over states on their own level such as Siam; this was won over an empire. Alaungpaya's crusade against the Mons was stained with treachery; the great siege of Ayutthaya was a magnificent dacoity", though he described the Sino-Burmese war "a righteous war of defense against the invader".

=== Geopolitical ===
The main beneficiaries of the war were the Siamese, who took full advantage of the Burmese absence to reclaim their lost territories and independence. By 1770, they had reconquered most of the pre-1765 territories. Only Tenasserim remained in Burmese hands. Preoccupied by the Chinese threat, and recovering from the depletion of manpower from the war, King Hsinbyushin left Siam alone even as Siam continued to consolidate its gains (he was finally forced to send Burmese armies to Siam in 1775 in response to a Siamese-backed rebellion in Lan Na a year earlier). In the following decades, Siam would become a power in its own right, swallowing up Lan Na, the Laotian states, and parts of Cambodia.

At the same time when China started to invade Burma, the Chinese were also being preoccupied by the same war against the Kazakh Khanate as part of the larger Sino-Kazakh Wars. This had greatly stretched the Chinese force, as they were also battling both the Kazakhs in Central Asia and the Burmese in Southeast Asia, which had prevented Qianlong from committing the best soldiers to the Burmese front until 1768; in a way, the Kazakhs might have accidentally contributed a minor role in helping Burma to defeat Qing China later on.

From a wider geopolitical standpoint, the Qing, and the Qianlong Emperor, who hitherto had never faced defeat, now had to accept—albeit grudgingly—that there were limits to Qing power. A historian of Chinese military history, Marvin Whiting, writes that the Burmese success probably saved the independence of other states in Southeast Asia.

=== Military ===
For the Qing, the war highlighted limits to their military power. The Emperor blamed the low battle-worthiness of his Green Standard armies for the first two failed invasions. But he was to concede later that his Manchu Bannermen too were less suited to fighting in Burma than in Xinjiang and Kazakh steppe. Despite sending in 50,000 and 60,000 troops in the last two invasions, the Qing command lacked up-to-date information about invasion routes, and had to consult centuries-old maps to form their battle plan. This unfamiliarity exposed their supply and communication lines to repeated Burmese attacks, and allowed their main armies to be encircled in the last three invasions. The Burmese scorched earth policy meant that the Chinese were vulnerable to supply line cuts. Perhaps most importantly, the Qing soldiers proved ill-suited to fight in the tropical climate of Burma. In the last three invasions, thousands of Chinese troops became ill with malaria and other tropical diseases, and many perished as a result. This neutralized the Chinese advantage of superior numbers, and allowed the Burmese to engage the Chinese armies head-to-head towards the end of the campaigns.

The war is considered the peak of Konbaung military power. Historian Victor Lieberman writes: "These near simultaneous victories over Siam (1767) and China (1765–1769) testified to a truly astonishing elan unmatched since Bayinnaung." The Burmese military proved that they were able and willing to take on a far superior enemy, using their familiarity with the terrain and the weather to their maximum advantage (the Battle of Maymyo is now a military case study of infantry fighting against a larger army.).

Yet it proved that there were limits to the Burmese military power. The Burmese learned that they could not fight two simultaneous wars, especially if one of them was against the world's largest military. King Hsinbyushin's reckless decision to fight a two-front war nearly cost the kingdom its independence. Moreover, their losses, while smaller than Qing losses, were heavy in proportion to their much smaller size of population, hampering their military capability elsewhere. Konbaung's military power would plateau in the following decades. It made no progress against Siam. Its later conquests came only against smaller kingdoms to the west — Arakan, Manipur and Assam, until running into the hands of the British, which ultimately spelt the eventual doom for the Burmese later on.

== See also ==
- Mongol invasion of Burma
- Ten Great Campaigns
- First and Second Sino–Kazakh War
- Burmese–Siamese War (1765–1767)
- Battle of Ngọc Hồi-Đống Đa
- Sino-Nepalese War
- First Anglo-Burmese War
