= Balamindin =

- ဗလမင်းထင်
- Born: Mu Valley, Kingdom of Myanmar
- Military career
- Allegiance: Konbaung Dynasty
- Branch: Royal Burmese Army
- Service years: 1752–1769
- Rank: General
- Commands: Fort Kaungton (1766–1769)
- Conflicts: Konbaung-Hanthawaddy War; Sino-Burmese War (1765–1769)
- Awards: Ye Kyaw Thura; Balamindin
- Other work: Governor of Kaungton

Balamindin (Burmese: ဗလမင်းထင်, pronounced [bəla̰ mɪ́ɰ̃dɪ̀ɰ̃] or [bəla̰ mɪ́ɰ̃tʰɪ̀ɰ̃]) was a general in the Burmese army of the Konbaung Dynasty. He is best known in Burmese history for his spirited defense Fort Kaungton against repeated attacks by numerically superior Chinese invasion forces in the Sino-Burmese War (1765–1769). From 1766 to 1769, Balamindin commanded the fort. The determined resistance by the Burmese at Kaungton proved critical in stopping the last three Chinese invasions. After the war, he was made governor of Kaungton.

== Background ==
Balamindin was born Maung Lwin in the Moksobo region (present-day Shwebo District) in Upper Burma. He joined Alaungpaya's resistance forces to the Restored Hanthawaddy Kingdom's invasion forces in 1752. Lwin was selected as one of 68 elite commanders who would become the core leadership of Konbaung armies for the next thirty years. He served with distinction in Alaungpaya's reunification campaigns, first achieving the title Ye Kyaw Thura, and then Balamindin.

After Alaungpaya died in 1760, Balamindin became allied with Alaungpaya's brother Thado Thinkhathu, governor of Toungoo (Taungoo). In 1762, Thinkhathu revolted against King Naungdawgyi, and Balamindin supported the rebellion. Naungdawgyi's forces laid siege to Toungoo, and recaptured the city. Naungdawgyi pardoned his uncle, Thinkhathu, and Thinkhathu's deputies, including Balamindin.

== See also ==
- Sino-Burmese War (1765–1769)
