= Maha Sithu =

Maha Sithu မဟာစည်သူ
- Born: Mu valley, Kingdom of Myanmar
- Military career
- Allegiance: Konbaung Dynasty
- Branch: Royal Burmese Army
- Service years: 1752–1769
- Rank: General
- Conflicts: Konbaung-Hanthawaddy War (1752–1757); Sino-Burmese War (1765–1769); Manipuri Rebellion (1770)

Maha Sithu (Burmese: မဟာစည်သူ, pronounced [məhà sìθù]) was a general of Konbaung Dynasty of Burma (Myanmar) who commanded the Burmese armies in the Sino–Burmese War (1765–1769). In the war, he was the commander-in-chief of the Burmese forces in the second invasion (1766–1767) but he gave up the command after he fell ill. He again was the overall commander in the third invasion (1767–1768). But he gave up the overall command to Maha Thiha Thura after he was defeated at the Battle of Goteik Gorge by a numerically superior Chinese army led by Gen. Mingrui. Maha Sithu redeemed himself later at the Battle of Maymyo, the most decisive battle of the war. Maha Sithu's army drove back Mingrui's retreating army while Maha Thiha Thura's army encircled the enemy. The combined Burmese armies totally destroyed the once 30,000-strong invasion army.
