= Ne Myo Sithu =

- Born: Mu valley, Kingdom of Myanmar
- Military career
- Allegiance: Konbaung Dynasty
- Branch: Royal Burmese Army
- Service years: 1752–1769
- Rank: General
- Conflicts: Reunification of Burma (1752–1759); Sino-Burmese War (1765–1769)

Ne Myo Sithu (Burmese: နေမျိုးစည်သူ, pronounced [nè mjó sìθù]) was the overall commander of Burmese military forces in the first half of the Sino-Burmese War (1765–1769). He successfully led the Burmese armies in the first two invasions by the Chinese (1765–1767). In the second invasion (1766–1767), he began as the second-in-command of Gen. Maha Sithu but assumed the overall command when Maha Sithu fell ill later. For the rest of the war, he played an important role, leading an army under the overall command of Maha Sithu (1767–1768) and then under Gen. Maha Thiha Thura (1768–1769).
