= Battle of Goteik Gorge =

Battle in the Sino-Burmese War, 1765-1769

Coordinates: 22°37′N 97°17′E

Battle of Goteik Gorge (1768) ဂုတ်ထိပ်တိုက်ပွဲ
- Part of Sino–Burmese War (1765–1769)
Date	Late December 1767 or early January 1768
Location	Goteik Gorge, Hsipaw (modern-day Shan State)
Result	Qing victory

Belligerents
(Qing dynasty) Qing Empire	Konbaung Dynasty

Commanders and leaders
(Qing dynasty) Mingrui	(Konbaung dynasty) Maha Sithu

Units involved
Eight Banners Army (Qing dynasty) Green Standard Army; Mongolian troops Tai militias	(Konbaung dynasty) Royal Burmese Army
- Bamar and Shan levies

Strength
~15,000	~7,000–8,000

Casualties and losses
Unknown	Unknown

The Battle of Goteik Gorge (Burmese: ဂုတ်ထိပ်တိုက်ပွဲ [ɡoʊʔtʰeɪʔ taɪʔpwɛ́]) took place during the Sino–Burmese War (1765–1769) fought between the Konbaung Dynasty of Burma (Myanmar) and the Qing Dynasty of China in late December 1767 or early January 1768. It was the first major battle in the third invasion by the Chinese who had previously unsuccessfully invaded Burma in 1765 and 1766. The Chinese victory cleared the way for the main Chinese army to Ava, the Burmese capital.

== Battle plans ==
The Chinese had planned a two-pronged invasion. The main Chinese army, led by Mingrui, a son-in-law of the Qianlong Emperor, was to approach Ava through Hsenwi, Lashio and Hsipaw, and down the Namtu river. (The main invasion route was the same route followed by the Manchu forces a century earlier, chasing Yongli Emperor of Ming Dynasty.) The second army, led by Gen. E'erdeng'e, was to try the Bhamo route again. The ultimate objective was for both armies to clamp themselves in a pincer action on the Burmese capital of Ava. The Burmese plan was to hold the second Chinese army in the north at Kaungton with the army led by Ne Myo Sithu, and meet the main Chinese army in the northeast with two armies led by Maha Sithu and Maha Thiha Thura.

== Prelude ==
The third invasion began in November 1767 as the smaller Chinese army attacked and occupied Bhamo. Within eight days, Mingrui's main army occupied the Shan states of Hsenwi and Hsipaw. Mingrui made Hsenwi a supply base, and assigned 5000 troops to remain at Hsenwi and guard the rear. He also assigned another 15,000 to guard the supply lines between the vanguard of the army and Hsenwi. He then led a 15,000-strong army in the direction of Ava. The Burmese main army led by Maha Sithu left Ava to meet the main Chinese army about mid-December 1767.

== Battle ==
In late December or early January, at the Goteik Gorge (south of Hsipaw), the two main armies faced off and the first major battle of the third invasion ensued. The Burmese army was outnumbered by two to one, and was thoroughly routed by Mingrui's Bannermen. According to the Royal Chronicles, Mingrui's men tricked Maha Sithu's vanguard into attacking them and then flanked them. Maha Sithu ordered a cavalry charge to breakthrough and while the Burmese riders managed to break the first Qing line, the Bannermen reformed and trapped the Burmese cavalrymen, killing or capturing most of them. Maha Sithu then fell back to down the line of the Myitnge river. The news of the disaster at Goteik reached Ava. Hsinbyushin finally realized the gravity of the situation, and urgently recalled his remaining garrison forces from Siam.
