= Minhla Minkhaung Kyaw =

- မင်းလှမင်းခေါင်ကျော်
- Born: c. 1714; Moksobo
- Died: 14 July 1756; Yangon
- Military career
- Allegiance: Konbaung Dynasty
- Branch: Royal Burmese Army
- Service years: April 1752 – 14 July 1756
- Rank: General (1752–1756)
- Commands: Musket Corps
- Conflicts: Konbaung-Hanthawaddy War
- Awards: Minkyaw Pyanchi; Minhla Minkhaung; Minhla Minkhaung Kyaw; Maha Thenapati; Agga Maha Thenapati

Minhla Minkhaung Kyaw (Burmese: မင်းလှမင်းခေါင်ကျော် [mɪ́ɰ̃l̥a̰ mɪ́ɰ̃ɡàʊɰ̃ dʑɔ̀]; c. 1714–1756) was chief of Musket Corps of the Royal Burmese Army of the Konbaung Dynasty of Burma (Myanmar). He was the top general under the command of King Alaungpaya, his childhood friend. He conquered Dagon in May 1755, which later became the city of Yangon. He died in action during the battle of Syriam in July 1756. He was buried with highest honors. Alaungpaya posthumously awarded his old friend the title of Agga Maha Thenapati (Pali: Aggamahāsenāpati), the highest honor possible for a commoner.

== Early life ==
He was born Shwe Kaung (more commonly known as Maung Kaung or simply Nga Kaung) in a small village of Moksobo (present-day Shwebo) in Upper Burma circa 1714. He was a childhood friend of Aung Zeya who was a son of chief of Moksobo.

== Military career ==
In 1752, Kaung joined his friend Aung Zeya's fledgling resistance force to resist the occupation armies of the southern kingdom of Hanthawaddy, which had toppled the Toungoo Dynasty at Ava (Inwa). Aung Zeya claimed himself king, and assumed the title of Alaungpaya. Kaung was chosen as one of the Sixty Eight Commanders in Alaungpaya's army. He was among the first seven of the sixty eight to win a title of valor with the title of Minkyaw Pyanchi for the successful defense of Shwebo (as their once little village was now known) against a major Hanthawaddy siege.

=== Upper Burma and Shan States ===
Kaung proved to be an able commander, winning many battles in Upper Burma and more titles. By mid-1754, he had been awarded Minhla Minkhaung Kyaw, by which he would be known thenceforth, and had been given the command of the Musket Corps of the army. With Upper Burma driven out of Hanthawaddy armies, Alaungpaya sent Minhla Minkhaung Kyaw and his Musket Corps to the Shan States to secure the allegiance of the nearer Shan States. (The farther Shan States, in present-day northern Kachin State, northern Shan State, southern Yunnan, remained out of reach.) After a show of force, Minhla Minkhaung Kyaw secured the allegiance of the Shan States. More importantly, he secured contingents of Shan levies for the upcoming invasion of Lower Burma.

=== Invasion of Lower Burma ===
By January 1755, at the eve of Alaungpaya's invasion of Lower Burma, he had been awarded Minhla Minkhaung Kyaw, by which he would be known thenceforth, and was the chief of the Musket Corps of the army. Alaungpaya's armies swept the western-side of Lower Burma, capturing Prome (Pyay) and the Irrawaddy delta by the end of April. In early May, Minhla Minkhaung Kyaw's musket corps led the capture the important town of Dagon (present-day Yangon) opposite the main seaport of Syriam (Thanlyin). For his success at Yangon, Minhla Minkhaung Kyaw was awarded the title of Maha Thenapati, (lit. Great Commander).

=== Battle of Syriam ===
Minhla Minkhaung Kyaw was given the overall command to take Syriam, with 5000 men and 100 war boats. But Syriam, which was defended by the French personnel and arms, repelled several Konbaung charges. Minhla Minkhaung Kyaw had to defend against a Hanthawaddy attack to retake Yangon in June. For the rest of 1755, no side made any gains, and the siege continued. In July 1756, Minhla Minkhaung Kyaw personally led another Konbaung attack by water and by land. While the Konbaung forces captured the only French ship left at the port, and further tightened the noose of the starving city, their lead general was severely wounded by mortar fire.

The dying general was brought back by boat to the other bank, where Alaungpaya and the rest of army was watching the battle. Alaungpaya had already heard of the news, and waiting right by the bank. As the boat approached the bank, the king discarded royal protocol and waded into the water to see his old friend, who had won him many battles. In Alaungpaya's hands, the general was said to have said "he was deeply sorry he would have to leave first". He died soon afterwards, while doctors were trying to save him. The king publicly mourned the death of his chief general and honored him with a funeral under a white umbrella before the whole army. It was 14 July 1756 (3rd waning of Waso 1118 ME). The general was posthumously awarded the title of Agga Maha Thenapati, the highest honor possible for a commoner.
