= Minkhaung Nawrahta =

Burmese general

- မင်းခေါင် နော်ရထာ
- Born: c. 1714; Moksobo
- Died: 5 December 1760; Near Kyaukse
- Military career
- Allegiance: Konbaung Dynasty
- Branch: Royal Burmese Army
- Service years: April 1752 – June 1760
- Rank: General (1752–1760)
- Conflicts: Konbaung-Hanthawaddy War; Burmese-Manipuri War (1758); Burmese-Siamese War (1759–1760)

Minkhaung Nawrahta (Burmese: မင်းခေါင် နော်ရထာ [mɪ́ɰ̃ɡàʊɰ̃ nɔ̀jətʰà]; c. 1714 – 5 December 1760) was a general of the Royal Burmese Army of the Konbaung Dynasty during the reign of King Alaungpaya. He is best known for his rearguard defense in the Burmese-Siamese War (1759–1760) in Siam as the Burmese forces rushed back a dying Alaungpaya back home. The general, who was well respected by the troops, then rebelled against Alaungpaya's successor Naungdawgyi. He believed he would be executed by the new king with whom he had a long history of enmity. The rebel general seized Ava in June 1760, and withstood the siege for over five months. He was killed by a musket shot as he fled the city in December. A remorseful Naungdawgyi was said to have mourned at the news of the death of his adversary and his father's brother in arms.

== Early life ==
The future general was born Maung Ton (မောင်တွန် [màʊɰ̃ tʊ̀ɰ̃]) in a small Upper Burma village of Moksobo (present-day Shwebo). He was a childhood friend of Aung Zeya who was a son of chief of Moksobo.

== Military service ==
In 1752, Ton responded to his friend and village chief Aung Zeya's call to resist the occupation armies of the southern kingdom of Hanthawaddy, which had toppled the Toungoo Dynasty at Ava (Inwa). Aung Zeya claimed himself king, and assumed the title of Alaungpaya. Ton went on to fight in all of Alaungpaya's campaigns, winning many titles for valor in the process.

He led one of the Burmese armies in the 1758 Manipuri campaign that made Manipur a tributary state of Burma.

=== Siam ===
Minkhaung Nawrahta was one of the lead commanders in Alaungpaya's invasion of Siam in 1759. He led one of the three armies that converged on the Siamese capital of Ayutthaya in April 1760. The Burmese were on the brink of victory when Alaungpaya suddenly fell ill from scrofula.

Alaungpaya personally selected his childhood friend to command the rearguard, which were "the pick of the army--500 Manipuri Horse and 6,000 foot, everyman of whom had a musket". Minkhaung Nawrahta spread them out and it was two days before the Siamese realized that the main Burmese army had left. The Siamese then broke out of the walls of Ayutthaya. His men watched the ring closing round them, and fearing to be cut off, begged him to let them fight further back. But he said "Friends, the safety of our Lord the King lies in our keeping. Let us not fight further back lest the sounds of guns break his further sleep." With his leadership, the Burmese forces withdrew in good order, collecting army stragglers along the way.

== Rebellion ==
Alaungpaya died on 11 May 1760, and his son Naungdawgyi succeeded him. Alaungpaya's second son Hsinbyushin had tried to take over the throne but failed. Naungdawgyi pardoned his younger brother at the queen mother's intercession. But the king was suspicious of other revolts. He sent for two of the generals he disliked. When they came unsuspectingly, he executed them without allowing them to see him. The army was furious.

Minkhaung Nawrahta too was concerned because of the old enmity between him and Naungdawgyi. He deliberately slowed down his rearguard back to Shwebo. Naungdawgyi then ordered his arrest. Although he had not been involved in Hsinbyushin's conspiracy, Minkhaung Nawrahta felt sure that he would be stripped of his command, and probably executed on some excuse. He decided to rebel even though he had no definite plan of rebellion. It was more a gesture of defiance.

He had been a simple villager in 1752, and he had fought in all the campaigns, shoulder to shoulder with Alaungpaya. He looked back on those eventful years, the victories that had come his way, and the titles and the honors that had been showered upon him by his grateful master. He said to his followers:

"I was a common villager when I drew my sword and said to my lord: "My friend, my comrade, the Mons are winning everywhere and thou must defeat them. With this sword, I shall make thee king or die in the attempt." But those days are gone, and my gracious master, who alone could help me in this crisis, is no more. This is no time for regret or fear, and I must strike, come what may."

His army occupied Ava on 25 June 1760. His garrison repelled all attacks by the king's army but by December, the city was starving. Seeing that the surrender was inevitable, the rebel general and a band of devoted followers fled the city. More than once, the pursuers surrounded him. But he still commanded such respect among the troops that the pursuers fell back in awe when he strode through them. In the Shan hills above Kyaukse, he was brought down by a musket shot. Even then, he overpowered the assailant who grappled with him, and had to be finished with a second shot. Such was the end of Alaungpaya's brother in arms.

Minkhaung Nawrahta was respected even by his adversary, Naungdawgyi. When Minkhaung Nawrahta's dead body was brought before him, the king was remorseful, saying "Should ye have slain so great a man?"
