= Teingya Minkhaung =

Burmese general

- တိမ်ကြားမင်းခေါင်
- Born: Mu valley, Kingdom of Myanmar
- Military career
- Allegiance: Konbaung Dynasty
- Branch: Royal Burmese Army
- Service years: 1752–1769
- Rank: General (1752–1768)
- Nickname: Teingya
- Conflicts: Konbaung-Hanthawaddy War (1752–1757); Sino–Burmese War (1766–1769)
- Other work: Minister at the Hluttaw

Teingya Minkhaung (Burmese: တိမ်ကြားမင်းခေါင် [tèɪɰ̃dʑá mɪ́ɰ̃ɡàʊɰ̃]) was a minister and an army general in the Konbaung Dynasty of Burma (Myanmar). He is best known for his effective guerrilla warfare against the Chinese invasion forces during the Sino-Burmese War (1765–1769). It was his expedition, under the order of King Hsinbyushin, to the northern Shan States in 1764–65 to collect taxes and manpower that led to the Yunnan government to take action.

Minkhaung became famous during the third invasion by the Chinese (1767–68) in which he directed the Burmese guerrilla warfare operations against the communication and supply lines between the main Chinese army led by Gen. Mingrui and its main supply base in Hsenwi. He attained the nickname "Teingya" (lit. from the clouds) for his swift guerrilla tactics.
