= Kawng Ton =

Kawng Ton ကောင်းတုံ Kaungton
- Location in Burma
- Coordinates: 24°08′11″N 97°06′18″E
- Country: Burma
- State: Kachin State
- District: Bhamo District
- Township: Bhamo Township

Population (2005)
  - Religions: Buddhism
- Time zone: UTC+6.30 (UTC + 6:30)

Kawng Ton (Burmese: ကောင်းတုံ) is a village in Bhamo Township in Bhamo District in the Kachin State of north-eastern Burma.

== Etymology ==
Kaungton comes from the Shan name Kwangtung, meaning "Sambar's field".

== History ==
Historically, Kaungton was an important emporium of trade with China, rivaling Bhamo.
