= Terai Army =

Nepalese militant group

The Terai (Tarai) Army is a relatively unknown militant group that demands greater rights for Nepal's Teraibasi people minorities primarily based in the southern plains. Demands may include autonomy. Authorities have blamed the group for murder, bombings and abductions. The Tarai Army has claimed responsibility for bombings in Kathmandu during September 2007 that killed three as well as a bombing in the southern Rautahat district in June 2008 that killed two.

The group was one among many that refused to participate in the 2008 election that brought former Maoist rebels to power and facilitated the end of the Nepalese monarchy.

Kaushal Sahani alias Mr. John, the chief of underground armed outfit Terai Army, was killed on 30 August 2008. Sahani and his bodyguard were shot dead by police in Raghunathpur area of Rautahat district. Sahani has been accused of masterminding several explosions in the capital and elsewhere in the country in the past.
