= Coronation of the Nepalese monarch =

Crowning ceremony and ritual of the Kingdom of Nepal

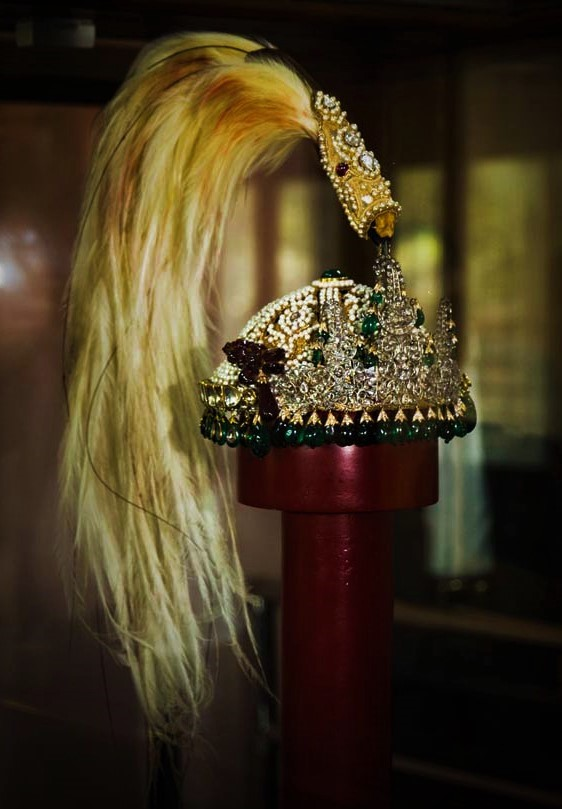
Shripech, the crown used by Nepalese monarchs during their coronation

The coronation of the Nepalese monarch was a rājyābhiṣeka, a Hindu religious ceremony in which the King of Nepal was crowned. The last coronation was held on 4 June 2001 for King Gyanendra, 3 days after the Nepalese royal massacre. The Kingdom of Nepal was the last Hindu monarchy in the world at the time of its abolition in 2008 when Nepal became a republic.

== Description ==
The coronation would take place on a date selected by court astrologers for its auspiciousness. On the chosen day, the new king would have eight different types of clay ceremoniously applied to parts of his body. He would then bathe in holy water before being sprinkled with a mixture of butter, milk, curd and honey by representatives of each of the four traditional varnas of the Hindu society: a brahmin, a kshatriya, a vaishya and a shudra. After these rituals, and at the most auspicious moment selected by the astrologers, the king would be crowned by the royal priest with the Shripech, a large jewel-encrusted crown.

After the ceremony, the king's subjects, family and courtiers would salute him and there would be a parade. The king, royal family and other guests and courtiers would ride through the streets of the capital Kathmandu on elephants.

== Gallery ==
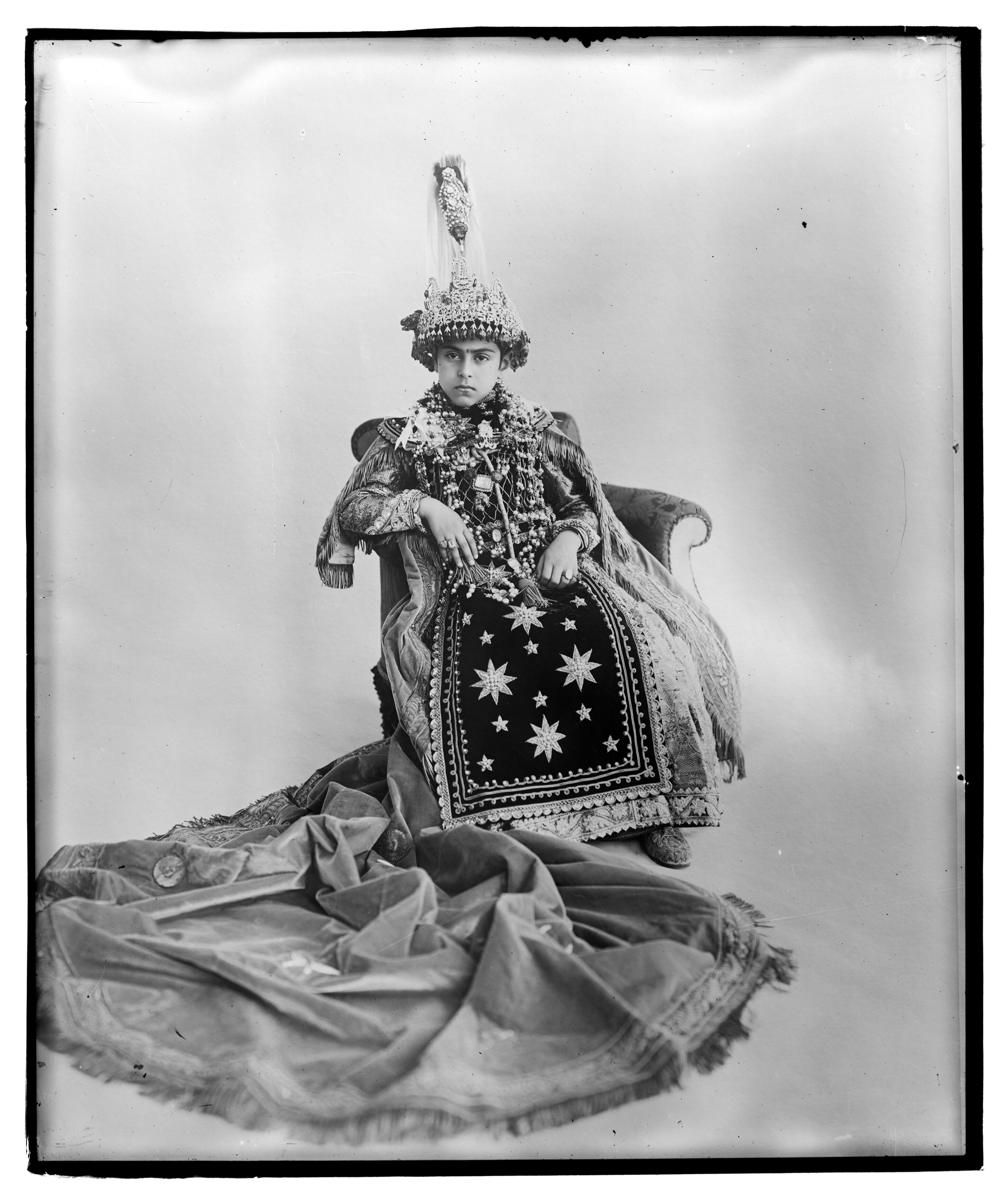
The Coronation of King Tribhuvan, aged 5, 1911

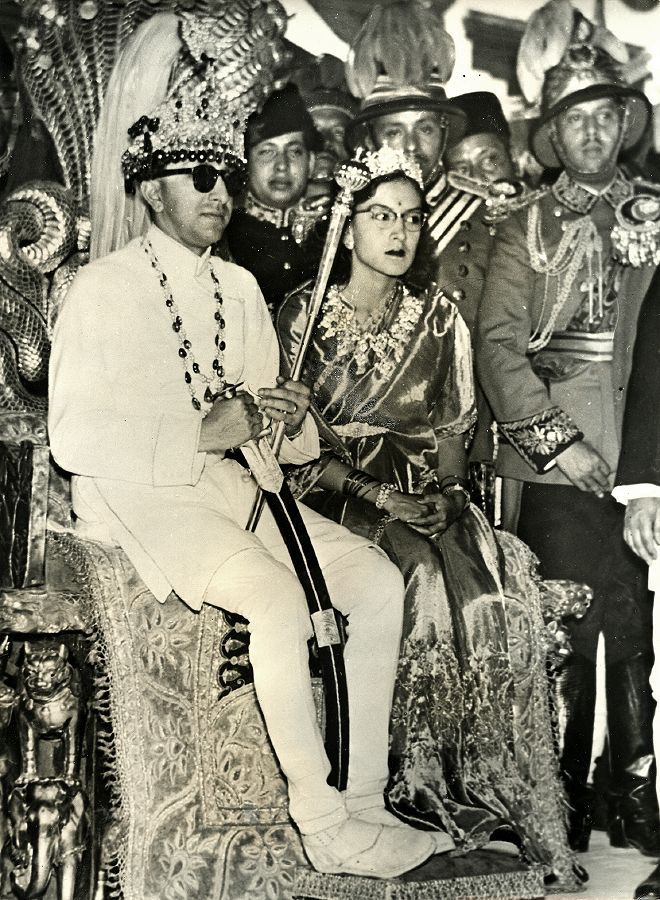
King Mahendra with his wife Queen Ratna during their coronation, 1955

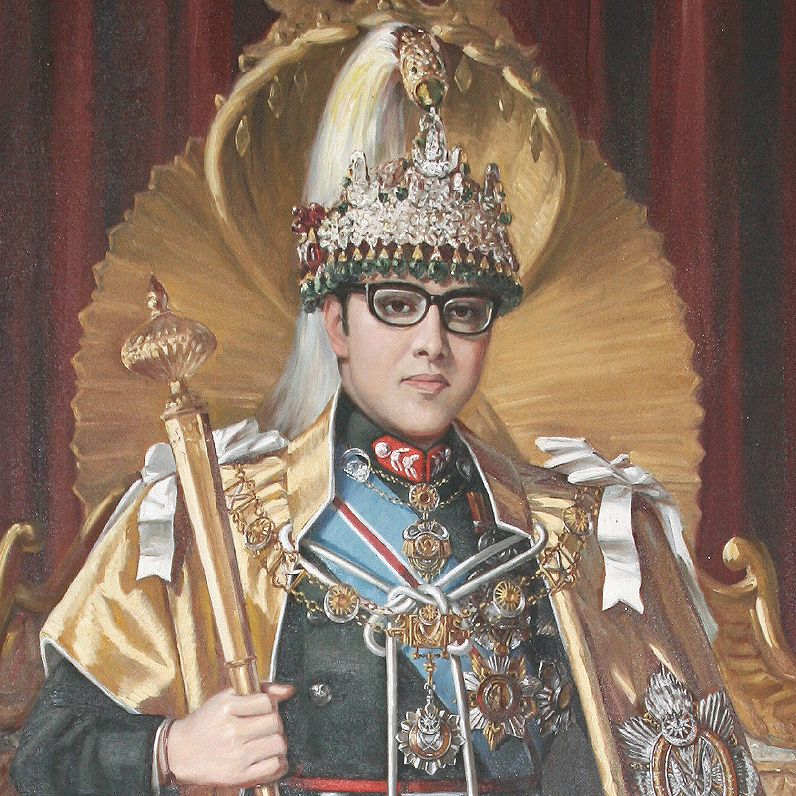
King Birendra depicted with the crown and sceptre in a portrait

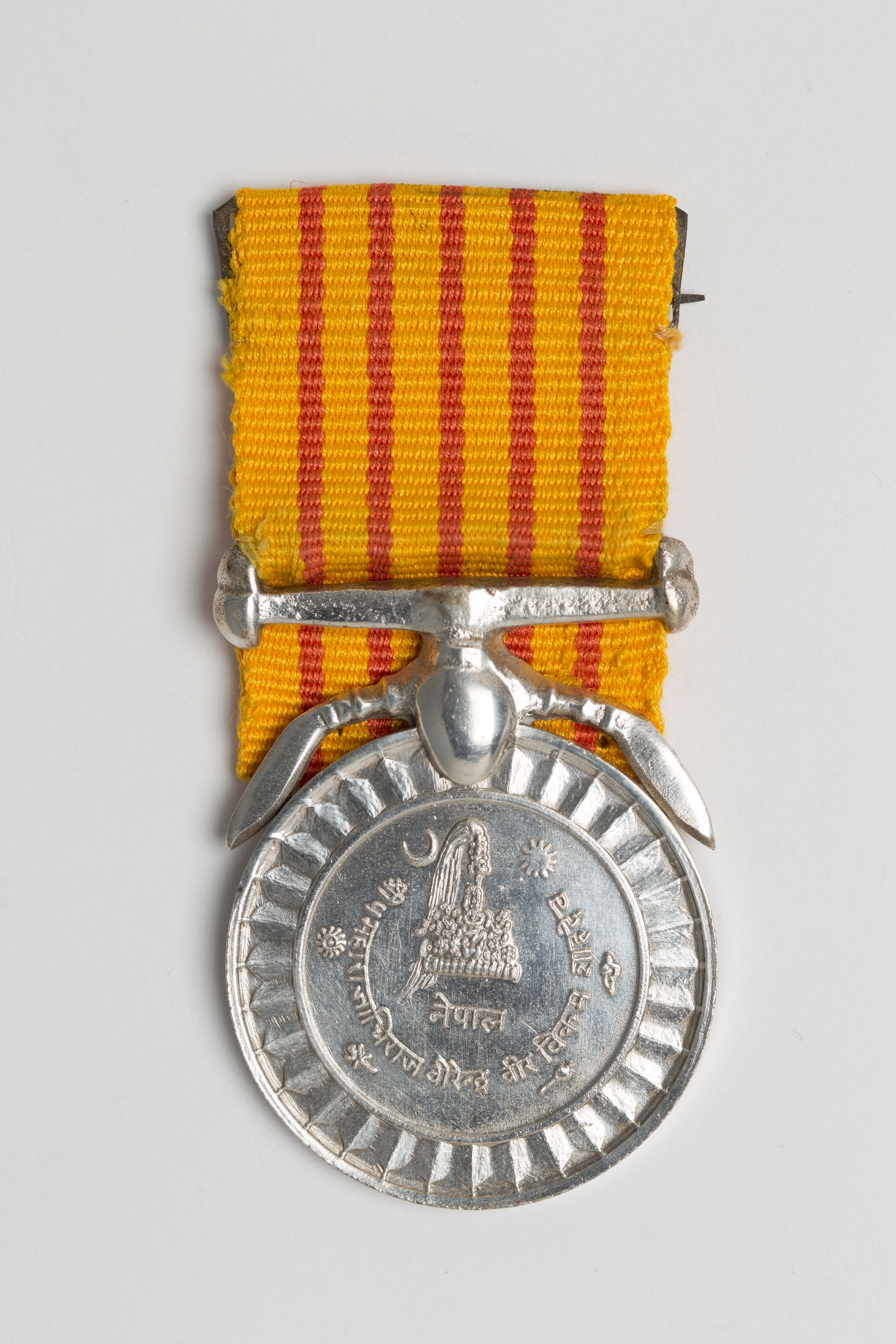
Medal commemorating the coronation of King Birendra, 1975

== See also ==
- Coronation of Birendra of Nepal
- Coronations in Asia
  - Coronation of the Burmese monarch
  - Coronation of the Thai monarch
