= National Defence Army =

Militant organization in Nepal

The National Defence Army is a Hindu militant organisation in Nepal which seeks to restore the Nepalese monarchy, which was abolished in 2008.

== Activities ==
The group has claimed credit for multiple attacks in Nepal:

- 2007, July: killing of a missionary in eastern Nepal.
- 2008, March: bombing of a mosque in Biratnagar, killing two people
- 2009, May: bombing of the Christian Church of the Assumption in Lalitpur, killing two people were killed and a dozen injured.
