= Rana Crown =

Ceremonial crown worn by Rana Prime Ministers of Nepal

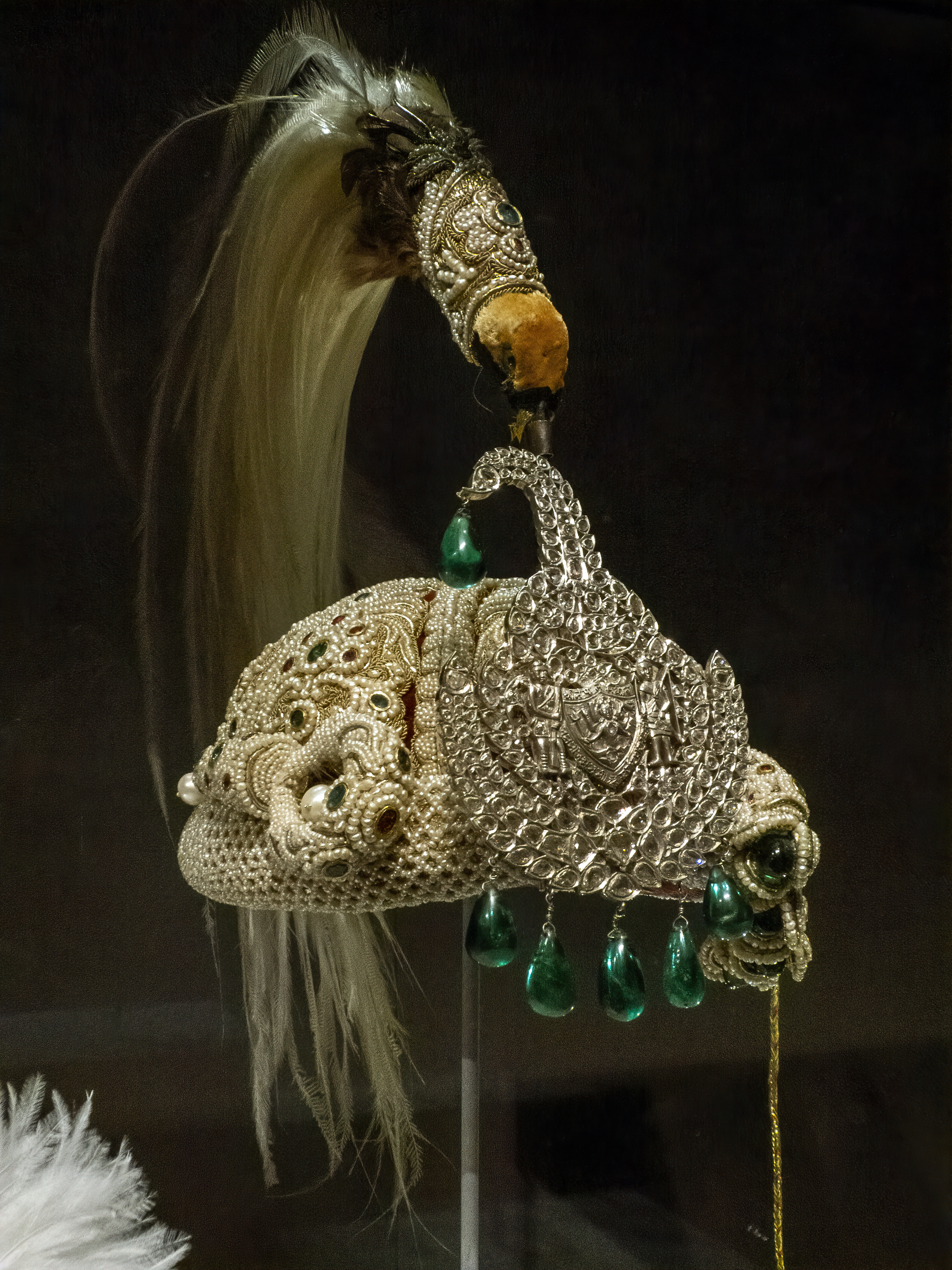
- Gem-set Turban Crown of a Rana Prime Minister, Nepal, circa 1900

Details
- Country: Nepal
- Made: circa 1900
- Owner: Private Collection, Japan
- Weight: Varies by type; generally 18–25
- Arches: Six ribs leading to a central emerald
- Material: Cloth, gold brocade, silver
- Cap: Pearl-encrusted gold brocade
- Notable stones: Pearls, diamonds, emeralds, rubies, coloured glass
- Other elements: Bird-of-paradise feathers; silver badge with Devanagari inscription and Nepalese coat of arms
- Predecessors: Shripech
- Successors: None

The Rana Crown (also known as the Gem-set Turban Crown) is a ceremonial headpiece from Nepal, produced in the early 20th century. It was worn by members of the Rana dynasty, who held hereditary positions as prime ministers during the Rana regime (1846–1951). The crown incorporates local materials and craftsmanship along with external stylistic influences. It served as a formal emblem of political office and high status within the governance structure of the period.

== Description ==
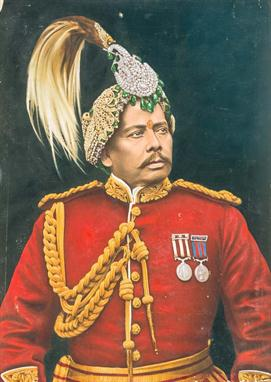
Dhir Shumsher Rana, Commander-in-Chief of the Nepalese Army, wearing a gem-set turban crown similar to those worn by Rana prime ministers in the late 19th century. The crown features elaborate plumes and jewels, symbolizing authority and elite status.

The crown is made from cloth, pearls, precious stones, and gold brocade. It features six structural ribs converging under a central emerald, and a plume of bird-of-paradise feathers. A silver badge at the front bears the Nepalese coat of arms and a national motto in Devanagari script.

== Role in Rana rule ==
The crown's design is linked to Jung Bahadur Rana Shree Tin Maharaj, who established the Rana autocracy in 1846. Such headgear served to differentiate ranks within the aristocracy. Use of imported feathers and elaborate ornamentation reflected the wearer's political stature.

== Exhibitions and provenance ==
The crown was held in a Japanese private collection and auctioned at Christie's in 2019. It has been exhibited at:

- Metropolitan Museum of Art (2014–2015)
- Miho Museum, Japan (2016)
- Grand Palais, Paris (2017)
- Legion of Honor Museum, San Francisco (2018–2019)

== See also ==
- Rana dynasty
- Shripech
- Shah dynasty
- Narayanhiti Palace Museum
- Kot massacre
