= Rājyābhiṣeka =

Hindu coronation ritual

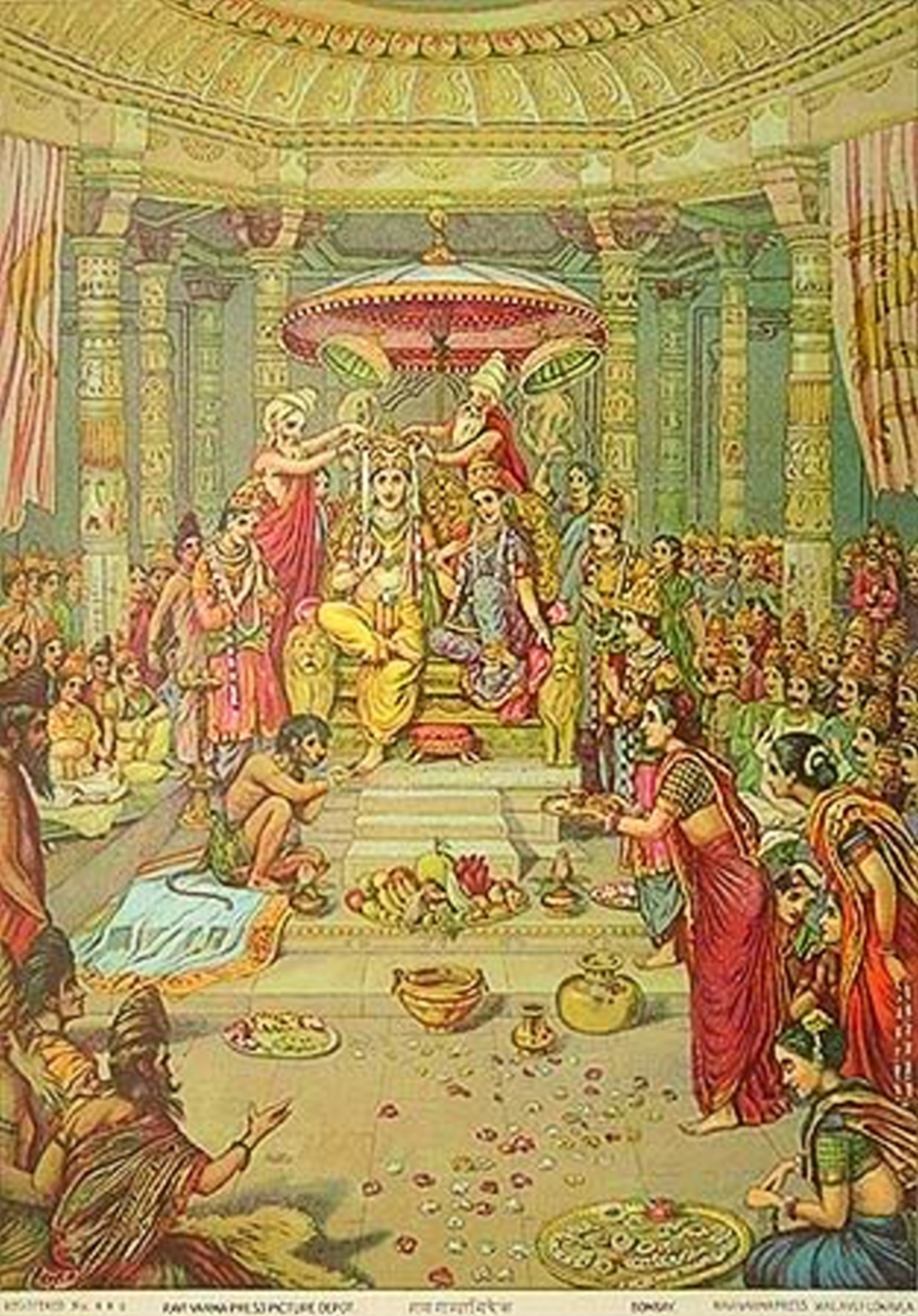
The rājyābhiṣeka of Rama.

The rājyābhiṣeka is a late Vedic ceremony of coronation. It also refers to anointing government officials, particularly heads of state, at the time of taking power or to mark a signal achievement.

== See also ==
- Abhiṣeka
- Rajasuya
- Coronation of the Burmese monarch
- Coronation of the Nepalese monarch
- Coronation of the Thai monarch
