= Shripech =

Royal Crown of the Kingdom of Nepal

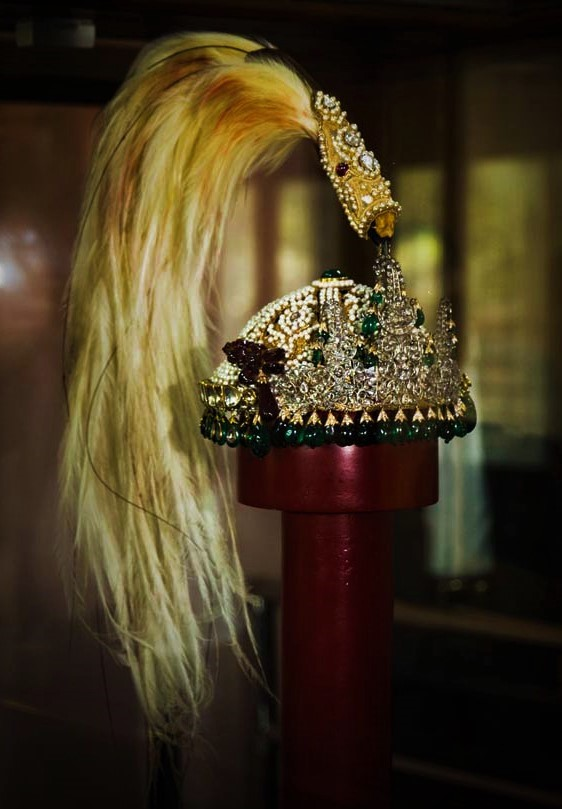
- The Shripech at the Narayanhiti Museum

Details
- Country: Kingdom of Nepal
- Made: c. 15th century (early form); c. 1843 (modern form)
- Owner: Government of Nepal
- Weight: 2 kg (4.4 lb)
- Material: Gold; Silver
- Notable stones: Diamond; Emerald; Pearl; Ruby
- Other elements: Tail feather of the bird-of-paradise
- Successors: Rana crown

The Shripech or Shreepech (Nepali: श्रीपेच) was the coronation crown of the Kingdom of Nepal, traditionally worn by Nepalese monarchs. During the Rana rule, a special variant of the Shripech, known as the Rana crown, was also created for members of the aristocratic Rana family to wear as a ceremonial headpiece.

The Shripech has been displayed at the Narayanhiti Palace Museum since 2018. It consists of more than 3,000 precious stones, including 723 diamonds, 2,372 pearls, 48 emeralds, and 16 rubies. It was wore by Gyanendra for the last time during his coronation on June 4, 2001.

== History ==
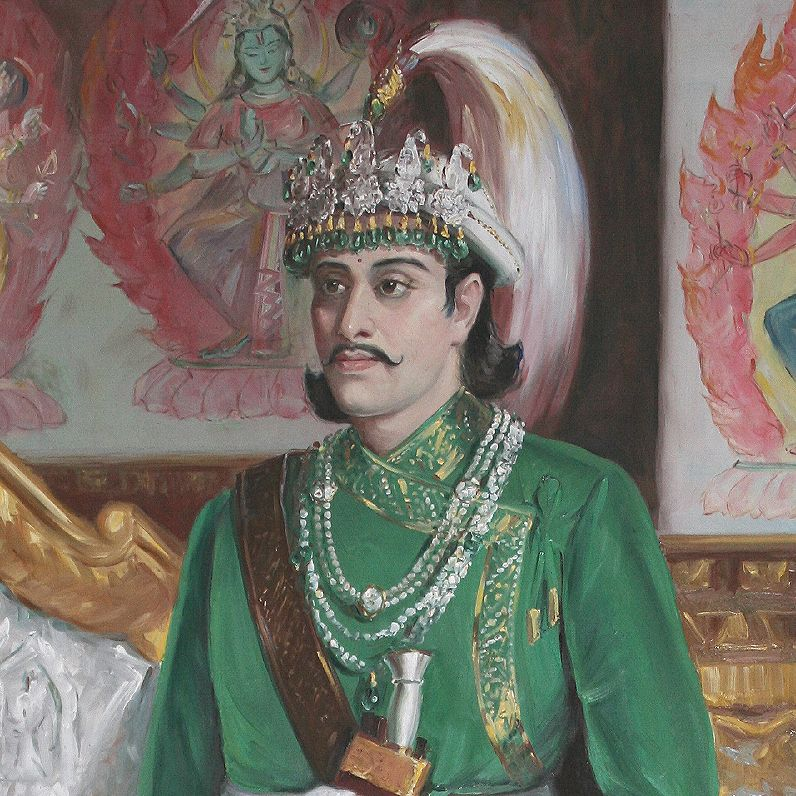
Rajendra Bikram Shah wearing the Shripech, first to feature the feather of the bird-of-paradise, 1816–1847.

Although there is no definitive evidence regarding when the Shripech was created, Rajendra Bikram Shah was the first King of Nepal to feature the large tail feather of the bird-of-paradise on the crown.

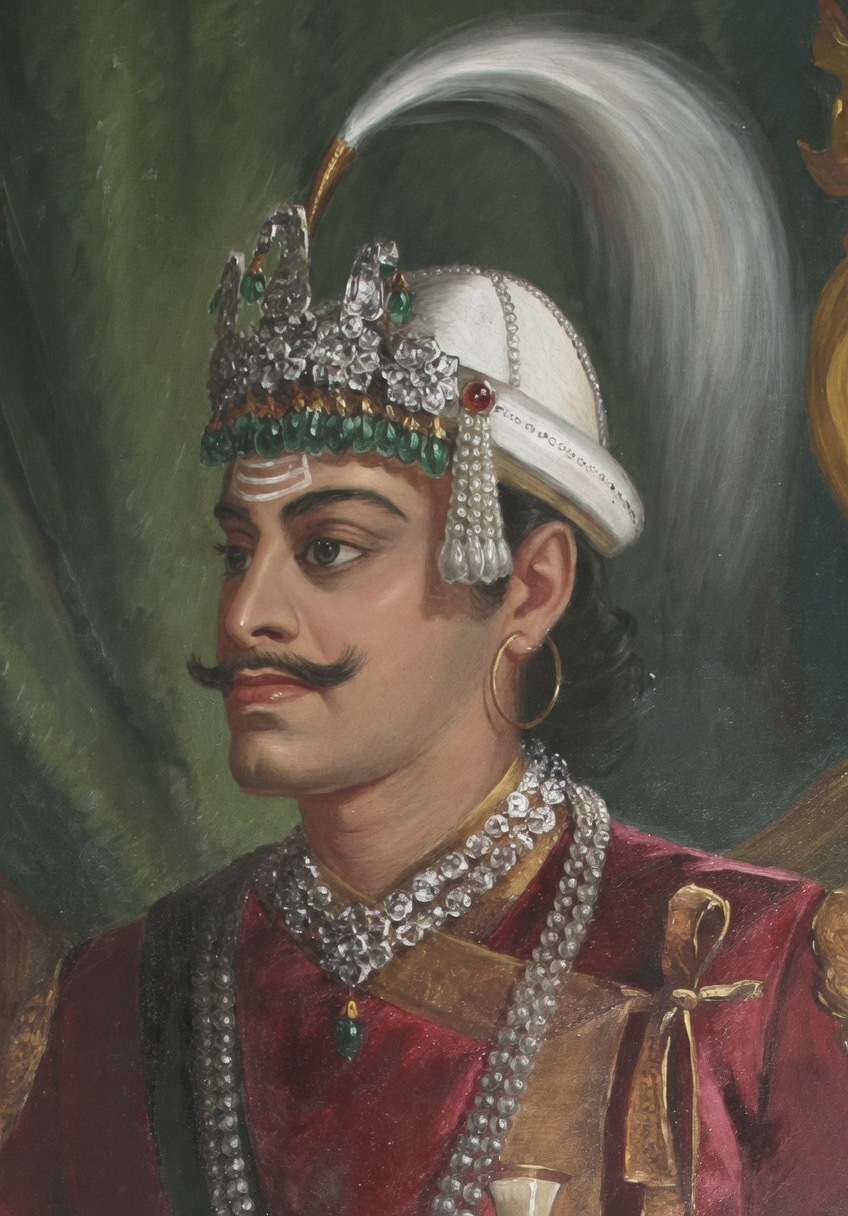
Pratap Singh Shah wearing the Shripech during the early Kingdom of Nepal, 1775–1777.

Earlier version of the Shripech had a similar design, but instead of the large tail feather of the bird-of-paradise, they featured a shorter feather. These earlier forms were worn by monarchs of both the Kingdom of Nepal and the Kingdom of Gorkha. Over time, the design evolved into the modern Shripech, which became a distinctive symbol of the Nepalese monarchy and was traditionally worn during important state and coronation ceremonies.

== Description ==
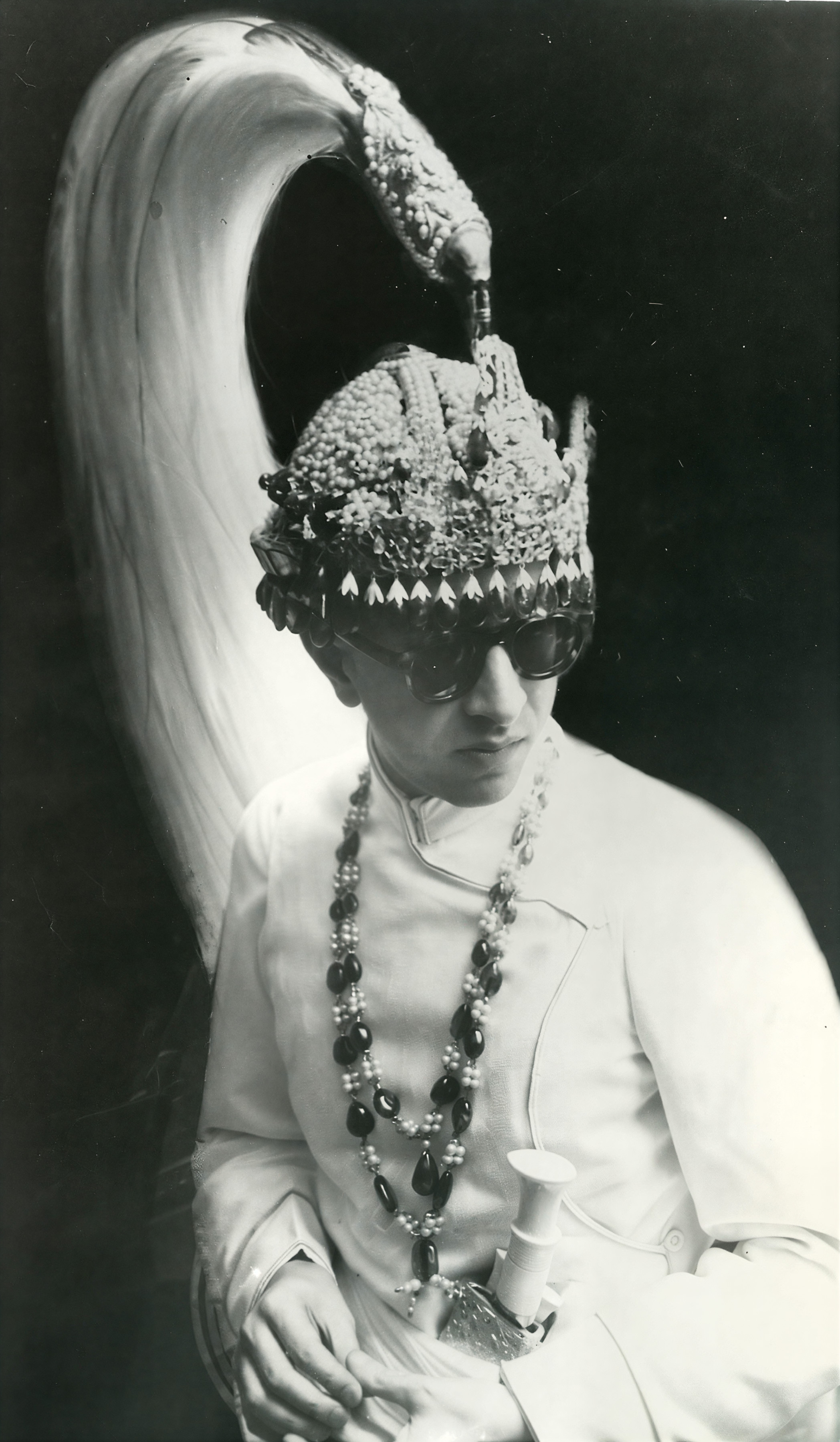
Mahendra Bir Bikram Shah wearing the Shripech during his coronation, 1956.

Apart from the Kalki (a large tail feather of the bird-of-paradise), the Shripech is adorned with diamonds, pearls, rubies, Navaratnas, gold, and silver. On 29 June 1965, while recording the details of the Shripech handed over by the Government of Nepal, officials of the Nepal Gold and Silver Business Association prepared a report stating that large quantities of diamonds, rubies, Navaratnas, and gold have been used in its construction, while silver made up the largest portion. The total estimated value of the Shripech is around $60 million (2024).

== Shripech gallery ==
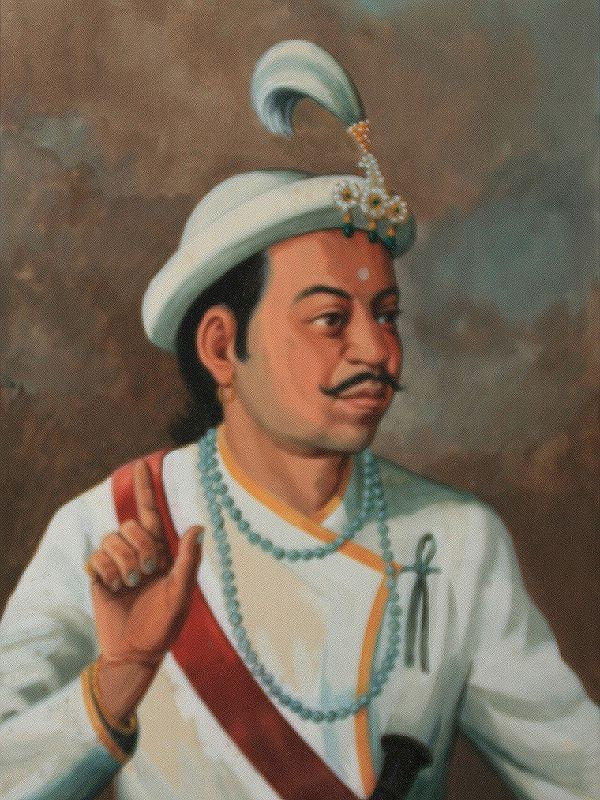
Ram Shah, 1606–1636.

Rudra Shah, 1661–1673.

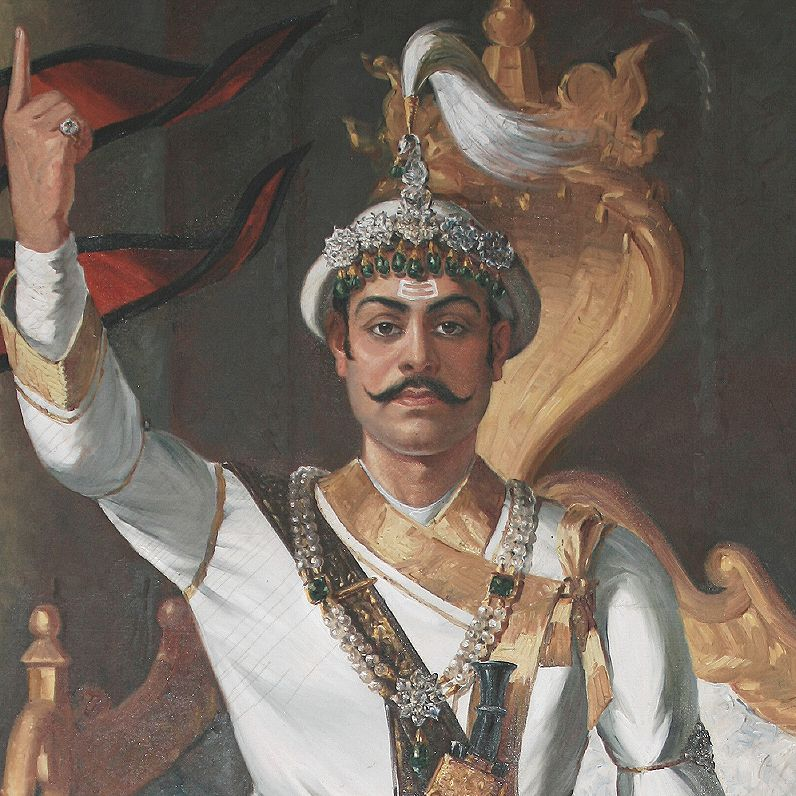
Prithvi Narayan Shah, 1743–1775.

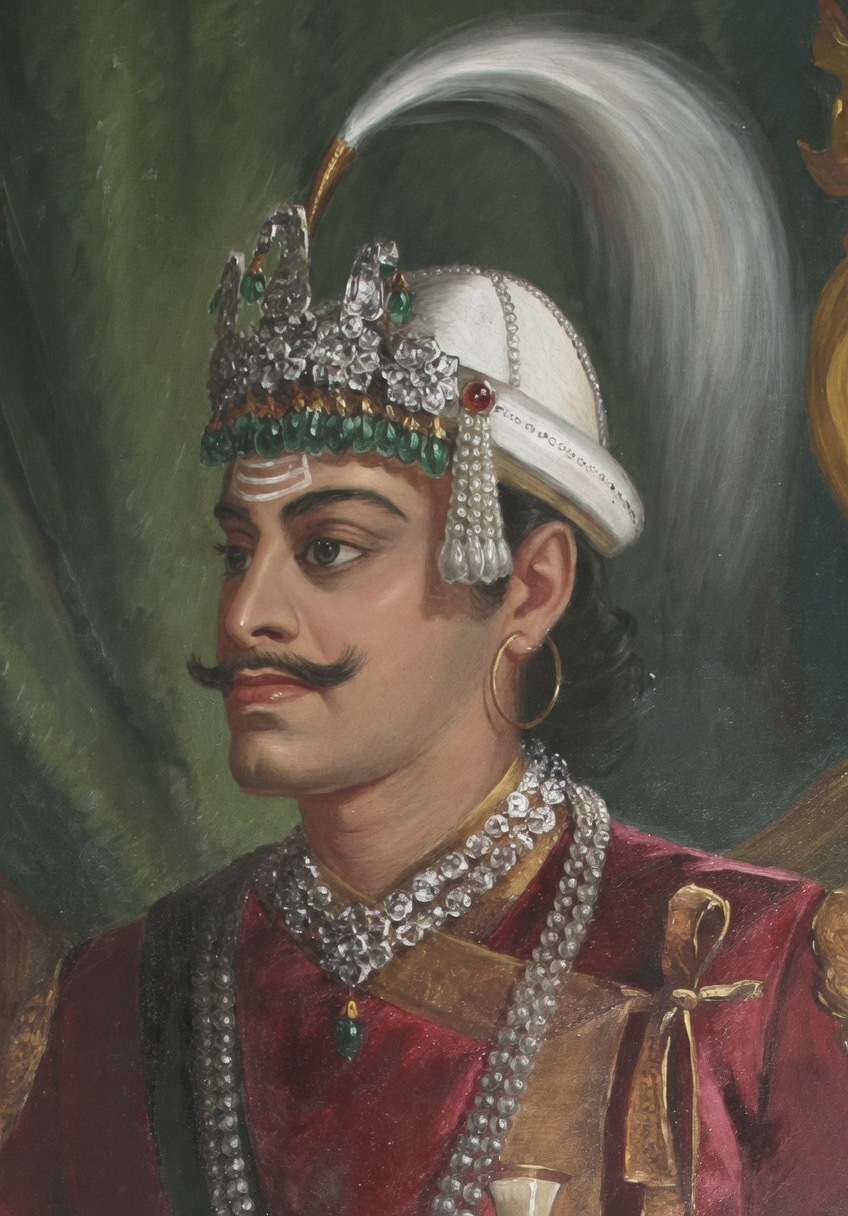
Pratap Singh Shah, 1775–1777.

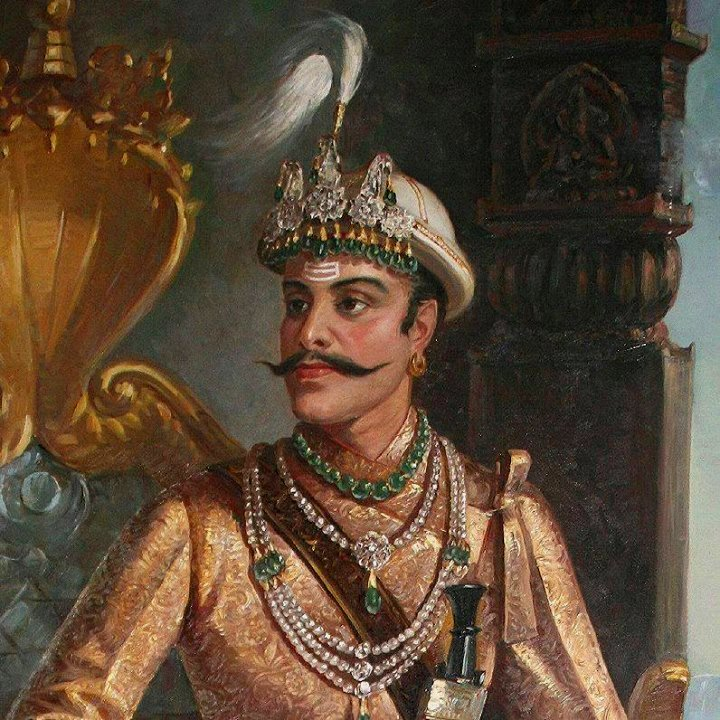
Rana Bahadur Shah, 1777–1799.

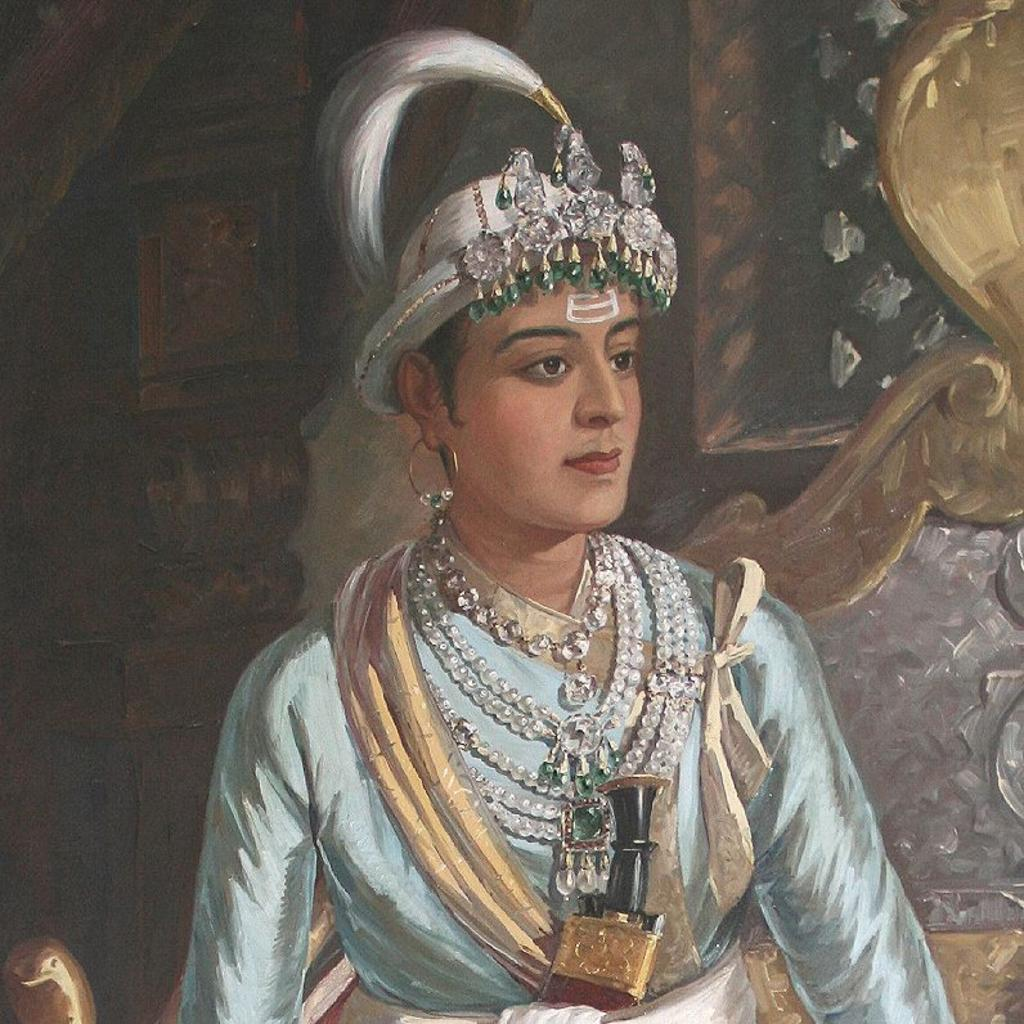
Girvan Yuddha Bikram Shah, 1799–1816.

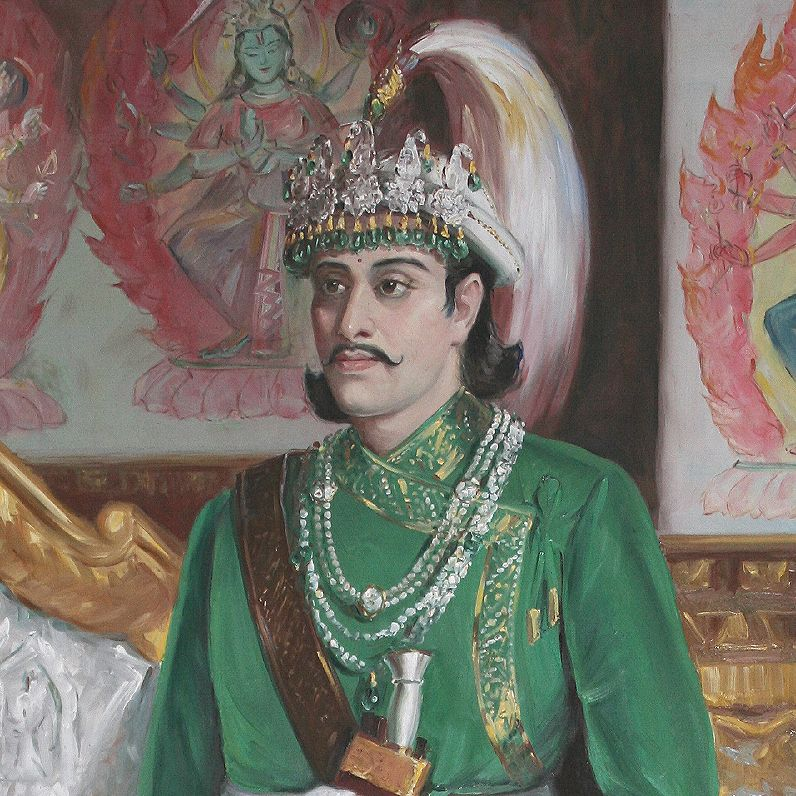
Rajendra Bikram Shah, 1816–1847.

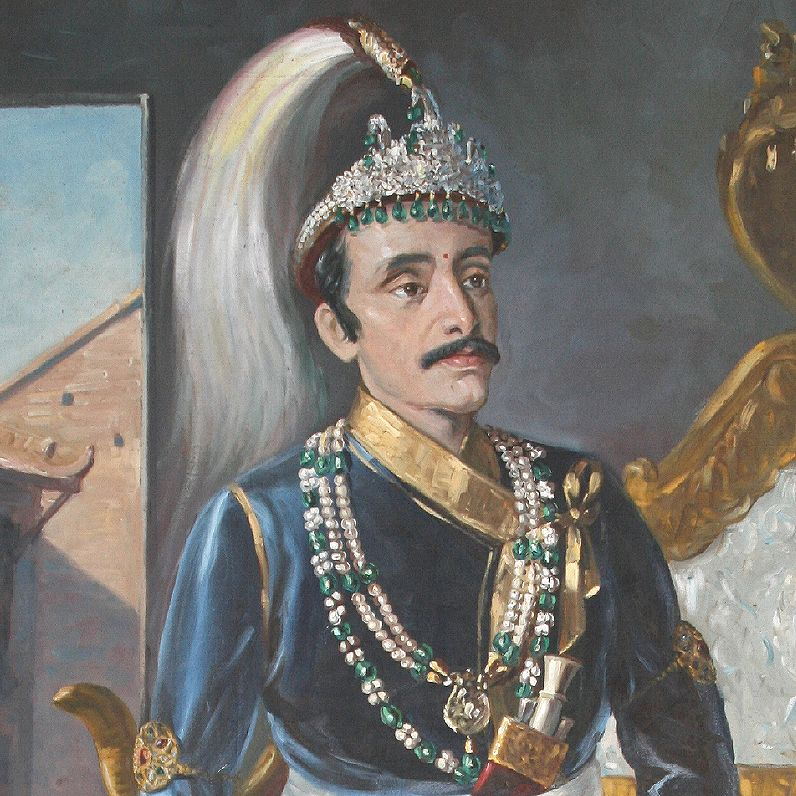
Surendra Bikram Shah, 1847–1881.

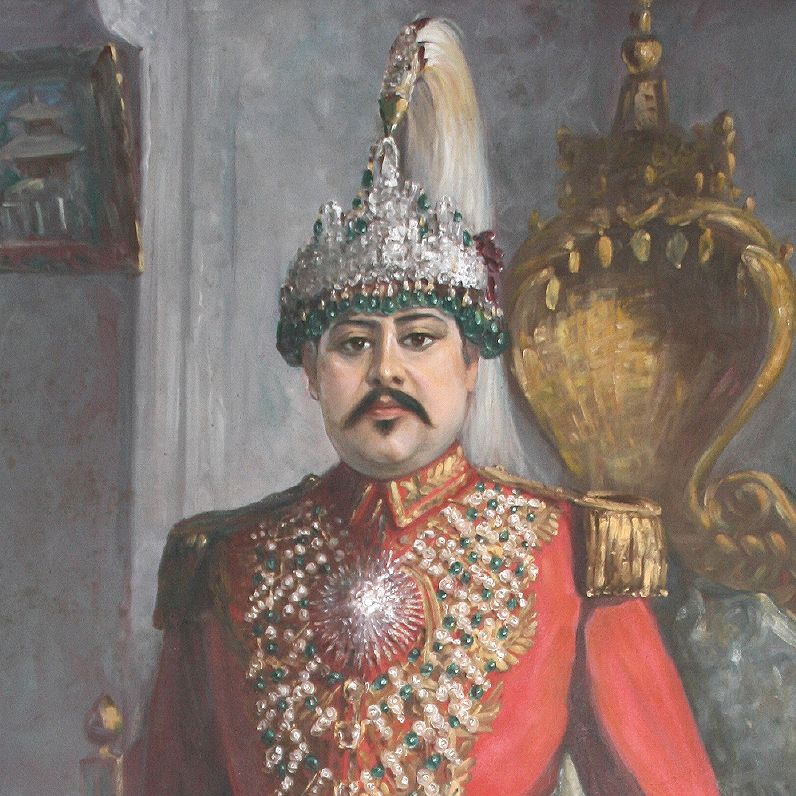
Prithvi Bir Bikram Shah, 1881–1911.

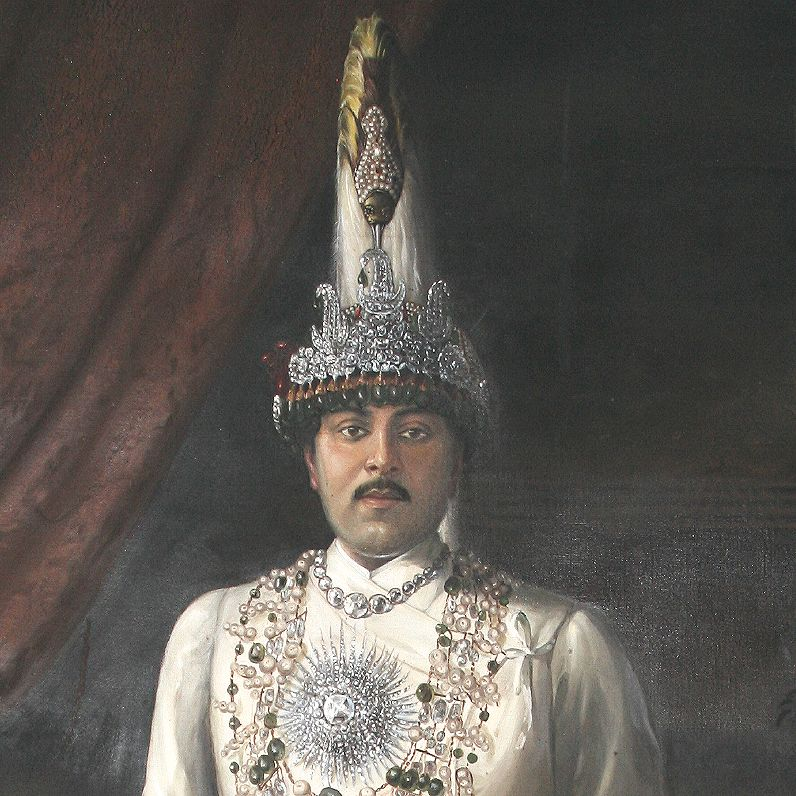
Tribhuvan Bir Bikram Shah, 1911–1955.

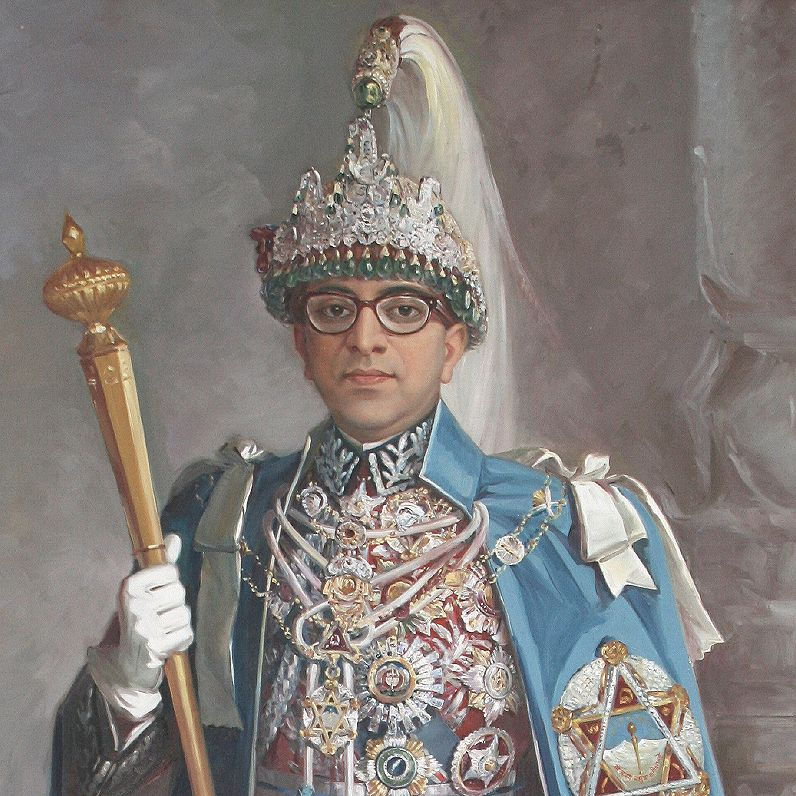
Mahendra Bir Bikram Shah, 1955–1972.

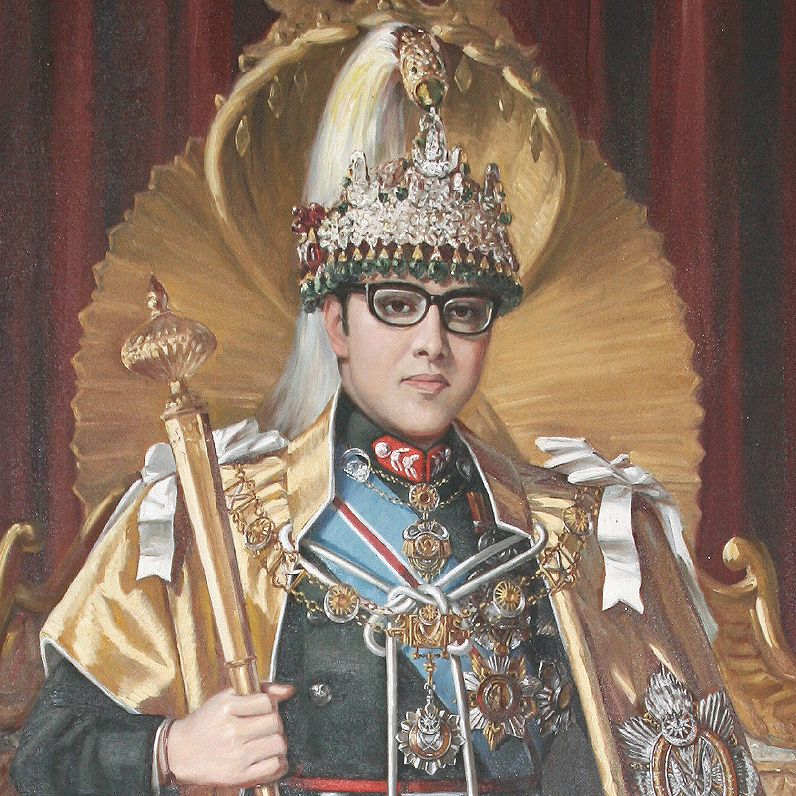
Birendra Bir Bikram Shah, 1972–2001.

== Rana crown ==
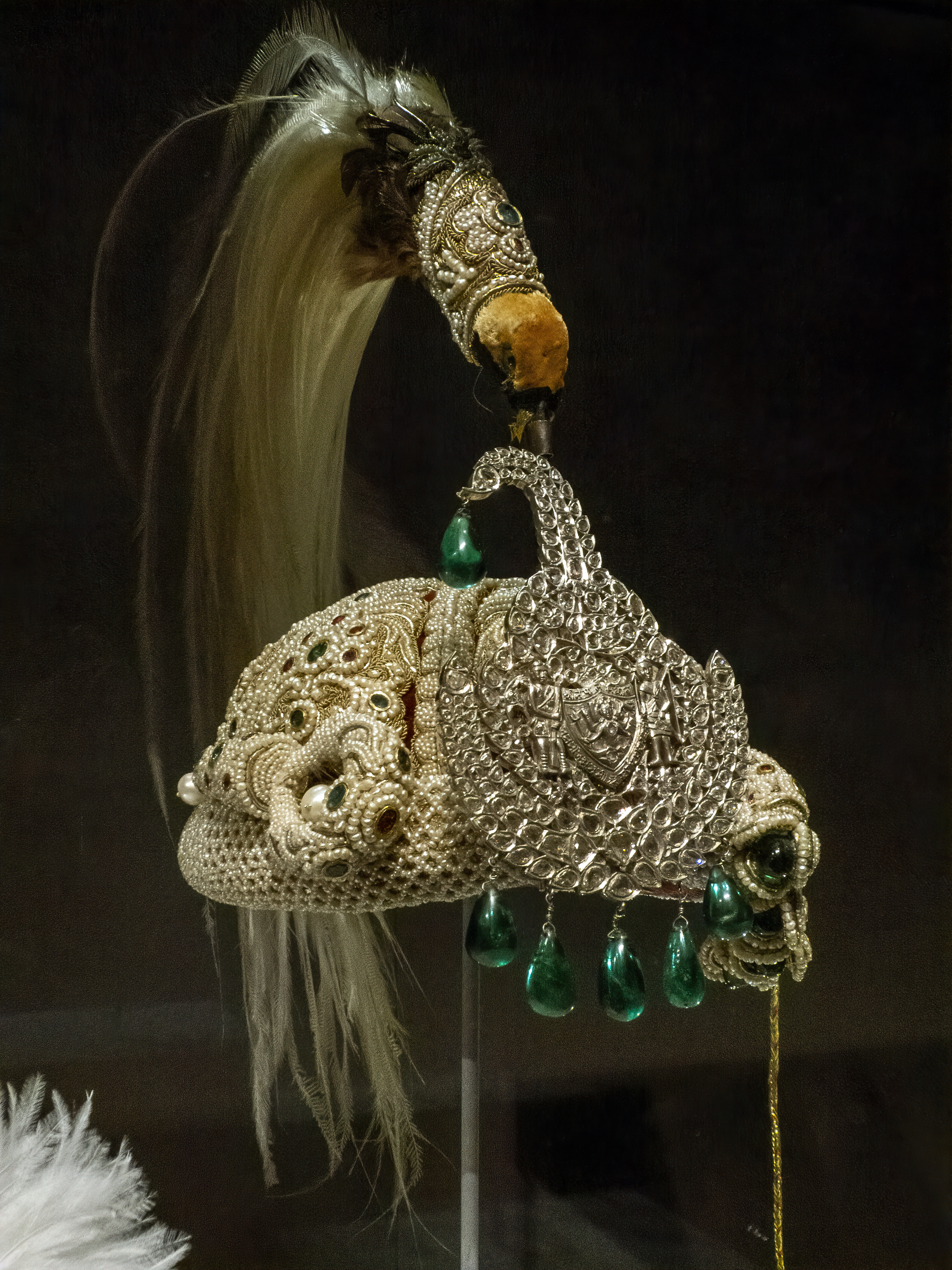
Rana Crown

During the Rana rule, a special variant of the Shripech, known as the Rana crown, was created for members of the Rana aristocracy to wear as a ceremonial headpiece.

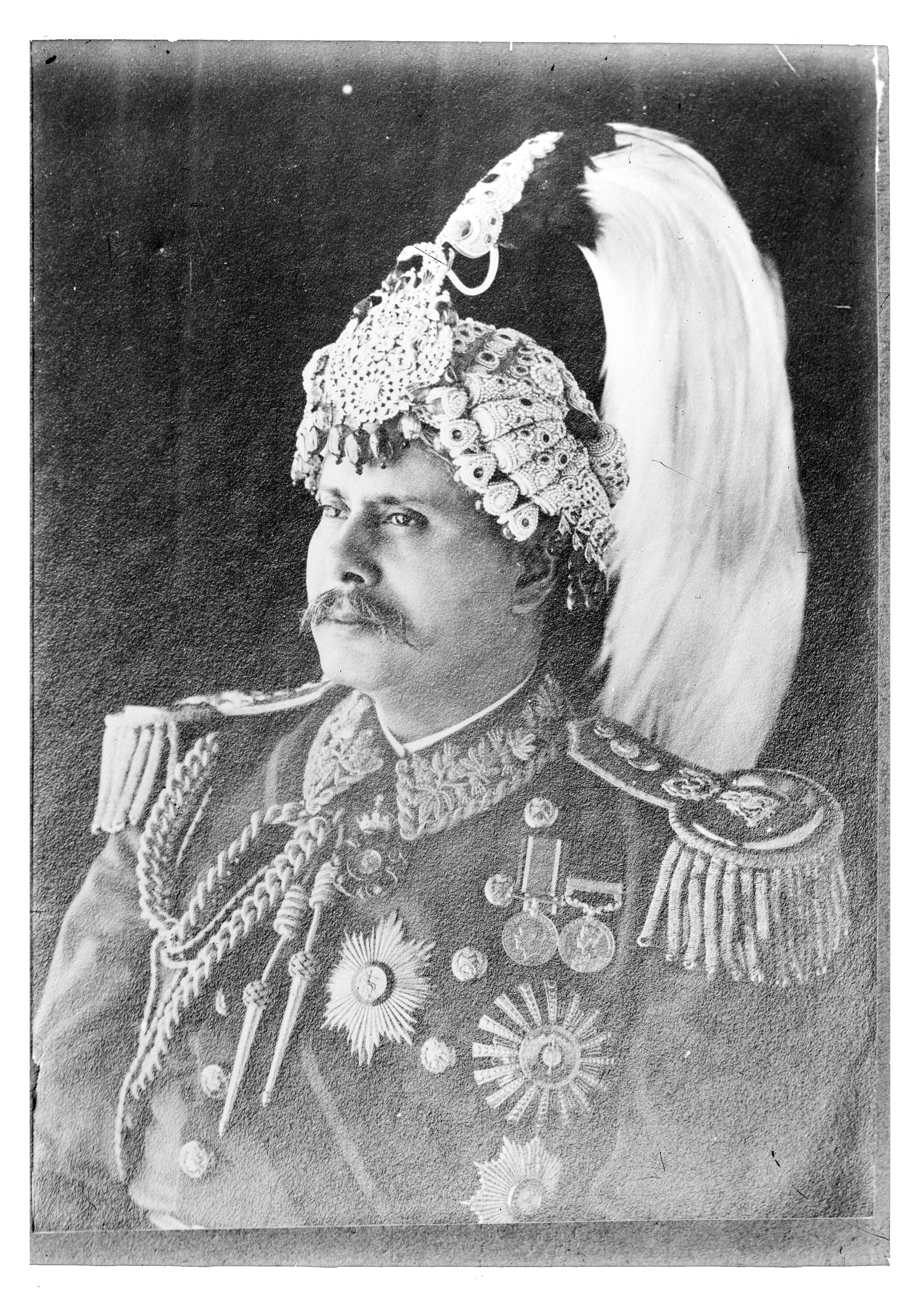
Padma Shumsher Rana wearing the Rana crown, 1945–1948.

Apart from the plume of the bird-of-paradise, the Rana crown is adorned with diamonds, colored glass, emeralds, gold brocade, navaratnas, pearls, rubies, along with a silver badge featuring the Nepalese coat of arms and the national motto in Devanagari script at the front.

== See also ==
- Coronation of the Nepalese monarch
- Greater bird-of-paradise
- Kingdom of Gorkha
- Kingdom of Nepal
- List of monarchs of Nepal
