= King of Nepal =

Head of state of Nepal from 1768 to 2008

- Mahārājdhirāja
- Royal coat of arms (before 2006)

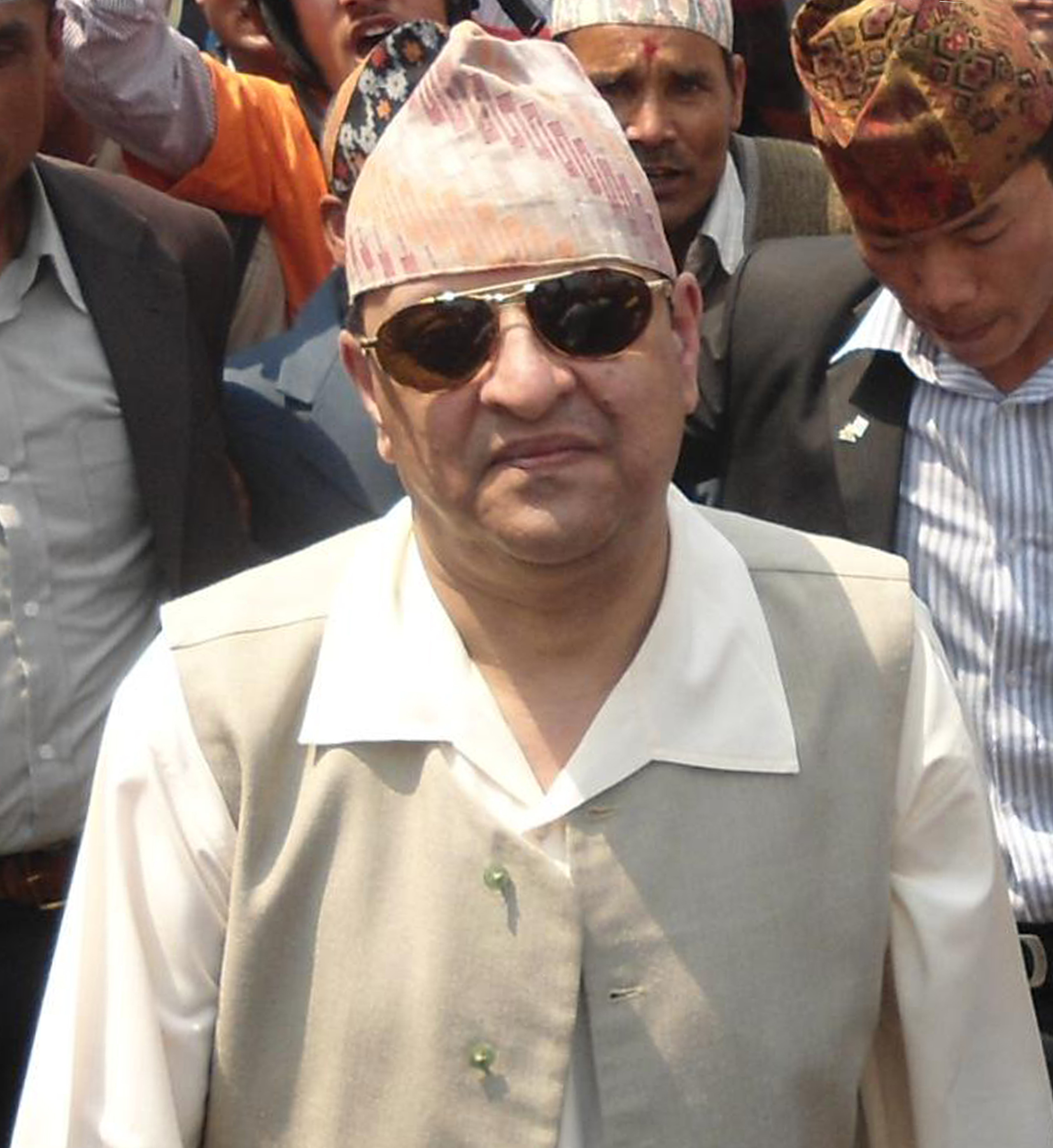
- Last to reign Gyanendra Bir Bikram Shah; 4 June 2001 — 28 May 2008

Details
- Style: His Majesty
- First monarch: Prithvi Narayan Shah
- Last monarch: Gyanendra Bir Bikram Shah
- Formed: 25 September 1768; 258 years ago
- Abolished: 28 May 2008; 18 years ago
- Residences: Narayanhiti Palace, Kathmandu
- Appointer: Hereditary
- Pretender: Gyanendra Bir Bikram Shah

The king of Nepal (traditionally known as the mahārājādhirāja i.e. great king of kings; Nepali: महाराजाधिराज) was Nepal's head of state and monarch from 1768 to 2008. He served as the head of the Nepalese monarchy—Shah dynasty. The monarchy was abolished on 28 May 2008 by the 1st Constituent Assembly. The subnational monarchies in Mustang, Bajhang, Salyan, and Jajarkot were abolished in October of the same year.

== History ==
The Kingdom of Nepal was founded on 25 September 1768 by Prithvi Narayan Shah, a Gorkha king who succeeded in unifying the kingdoms of Kathmandu, Patan, and Bhaktapur into a single state under his Shah dynasty. The Kingdom of Nepal was de jure an absolute monarchy for most of its history. However, from 1846 until the 1951 revolution, the country was de facto ruled by the hereditary prime ministers from the Rana dynasty, reducing the role of the Shah monarch to that of a figurehead. In November 1990, after the Jana Andolan movement, a new constitution was adopted and the country became a constitutional monarchy.

=== Nepalese Civil War ===
On 13 February 1996, the Nepalese Civil War was launched by the Communist Party of Nepal (Maoist), with the aim of overthrowing the kingdom and establishing a "people's republic".

== Nepal Monarchy (1960-1990) ==
The Nepal Monarchy from 1960 to 1990 was considered an executive monarchy, with little to no consitutional guidelines. This was possible following the concentration of power by the king after the royal coup, which formally dissolved the nascent democracy, and the rise of the Panchayat king-led system. Following the 1960 coup d'etat, a new constitution of the Kingdom of Nepal was formed, commonly known as the Panchayat constitution, which formalised the role of the king as both head of state (as already was the case) and chief executive, or head of the government of Nepal. The latter was ordinarily to be the prime minister, but the prime minister was appointed by the king of Nepal during this period, so effective power rested in the Throne.

The period saw partial democracy in the Kingdom, constituted by panchas, who were locally elected members of the Panchayat parliament which was considered and billed as the "Native suitable democracy" for Nepal. The established parliament, however, could not challenge an order of the king, and the king had the power to dissolve it for any reason whatsoever, or even to refuse the conduct of its election (though its election was regular).

The formal formation of political parties and their participation was illegal and suppressed. Many pro-democracy or pro-communist leaders were arrested and served jail time, for various reasons including treason, false corruption charges, or simply lese majeste. In the same period, the most lasting effect was the formalisation of Nepali nationalism, and the increase in literacy of the people (which ultimately proved fatal to the system itself in 1990). The effective nationalism was focused on "one king, one nation, one language", or in some versions "one attire, one culture, one language". In the period, Hindusim was declared the state faith, though its caste system was abolished and made illegal, becoming the first constitution of Nepal do so. Though Hindusim was already prominent in previous eras, it became part of and strongly linked with Nepaliness.

The period saw the lingustic assimilation, with mandatory use of Nepali as prominent not only in administraiton but on the cultural, literary, and educational levels. This period saw the migration of many hill people to terai, which many considered an assimialistic policy, and others a valid state-building process. This led for the first time to a native hill population in terai, and to their descendants causing the Nepalification of many non-Nepali people also in terai.

==== Nepalese royal massacre ====
On 1 June 2001, nine members of the royal family, including King Birendra and Queen Aishwarya, were killed in a mass shooting at the royal residence. Crown Prince Dipendra was implicated in an official investigation. There is a huge controversy concerning this, as there was no practical investigation on that which proves his involvement. Many Nepali people believe that there might be many other people involved in the massacre. Immediately after the massacre, Dipendra was proclaimed king while in a coma, but he died on 4 June 2001, after a three-day reign. His uncle, Prince Gyanendra, was appointed regent for the three days, then ascended the throne himself after Dipendra died.

==== Post-massacre ====
On 1 February 2005, as the security situation deteriorated in the civil war, King Gyanendra staged a coup d'état, declared a state of emergency, suspended the constitution and assumed direct control over the country. On 24 April 2006, after the Loktantra Andolan movement, the king agreed to give up absolute power and to reinstate the dissolved House of Representatives. On 21 November 2006, the civil war was ended with the signing of the Comprehensive Peace Accord. On 15 January 2007, the King was suspended from exercising his duties by the newly formed interim legislature. Finally, on 28 May 2008, the kingdom was officially abolished by the 1st Constituent Assembly and the Federal Democratic Republic of Nepal was declared. The subnational monarchies in Mustang, Bajhang, Salyan, and Jajarkot were also abolished in October 2008.

== Royal standard and crown ==
Royal Standard of Nepal (c. 1928)

Royal Standard of Nepal (c. 1969)

Royal Standard of Nepal (c. 2001)

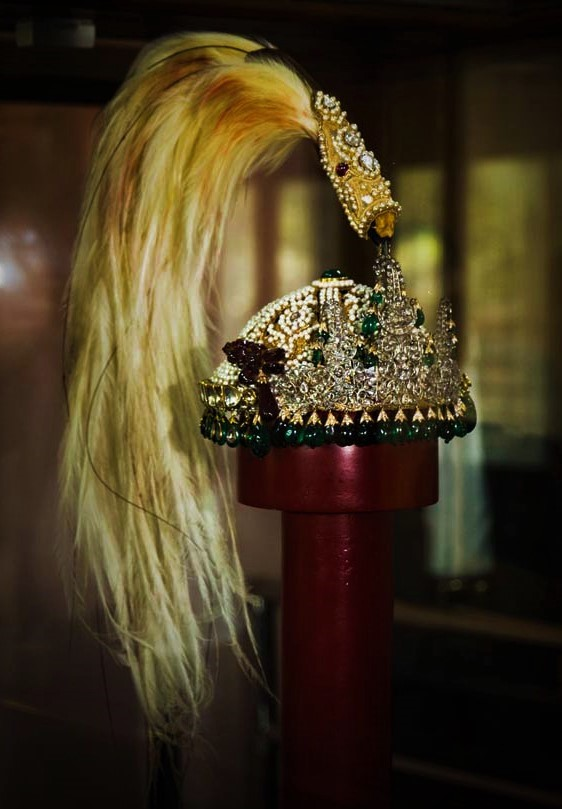
Royal Crown of Nepal, Shripech

== See also ==
- Coronation of the Nepalese monarch
- List of heads of state of Nepal
- National Defence Army
- Panchayat (Nepal)
- President of Nepal
- Prime Minister of Nepal
  - List of prime ministers of Nepal
- Rastriya Prajatantra Party Nepal
