= Coronation of the Burmese monarch =

Ritual of the Burmese Kingdom

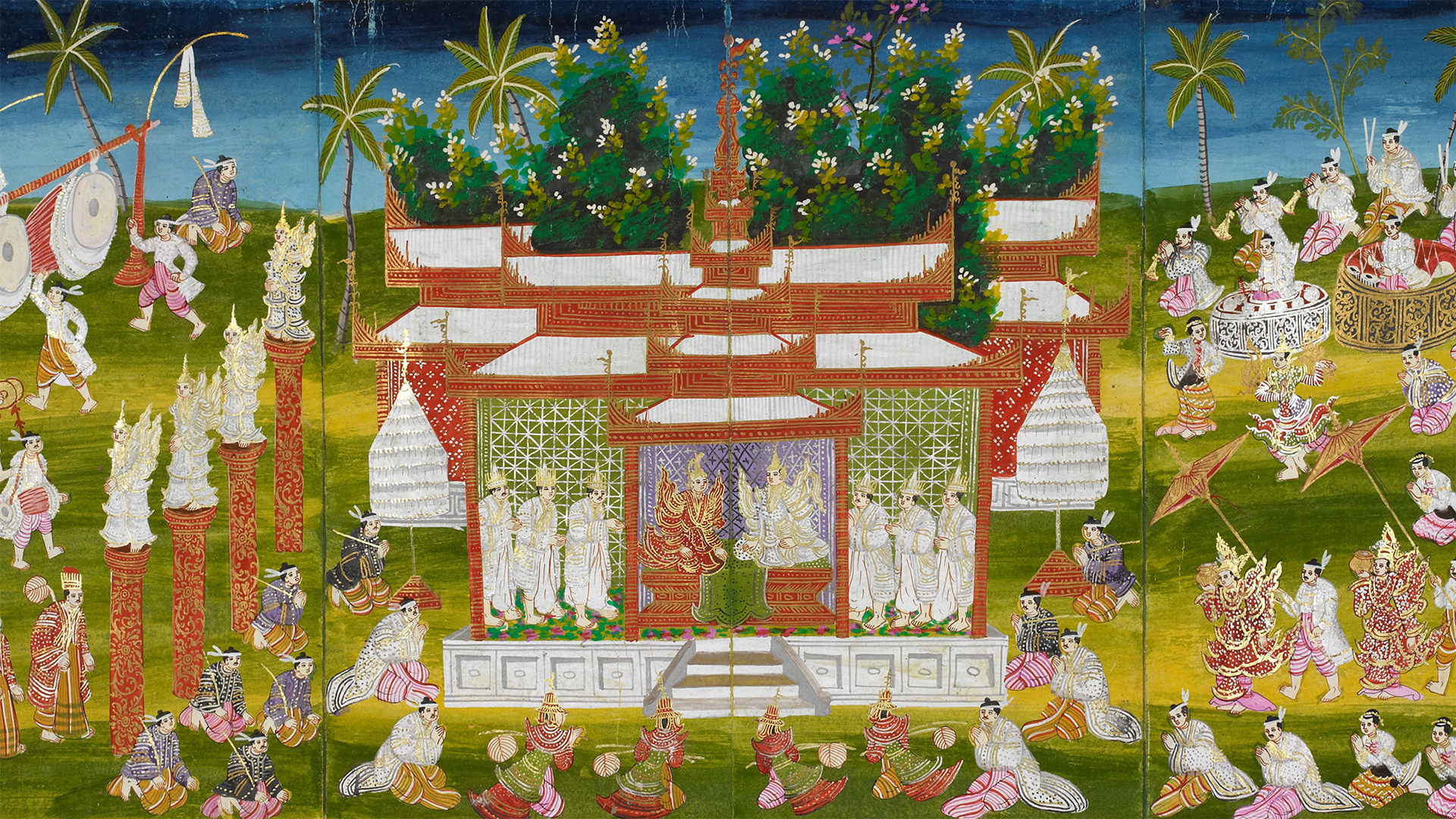
A nineteenth-century watercolor painting by royal painters depicts a Konbaung abhiseka ceremony. The king and queen are respectively seated in the pavilion, surrounded by a retinue of Brahmins.

The coronation (Rajabhiseka) was one of the most important rituals of the Burmese Kingdom. Similar to the neighboring countries Thailand, Cambodia and Laos the ceremony is largely influenced by the Indian Hindu Culture. Most of them were typically held in the Burmese month of Kason, but did not necessarily occur during the beginning of a reign. The Sasanalankara states that Bodawpaya, like his father, was crowned only after establishing control over the kingdom's administration and purifying the religious institutions. The coronation is then followed by the assumption of the Royal Residence. Following are the rituals done during the coronation of King Mindon on 14 May 1857.

== Initial process ==
The first process of the coronation is to build three new pavilions. The timber, bamboo and canes required had to be provided by the asan (အသည်). Then the site of the pavilions had to be ploughed up thrice. Once by bankers sons wearing yellow clothes, secondly by rich men sons dressed in red with silver farrows and lastly by farmers sons wearing green clothes with iron farrows. The ceremonial ploughing had to be done with bulls and not by oxen as usual. After the earth had been turned up it had to be sprinkled thoroughly with milk, then cow-dung, then with grain-barley sesame, cotton, millet peas and paddy. Then the area was enclosed by a fence called daung chan (ဒေါင်းခြံ).

== Offerings and prayers ==
Various offerings had to be made to the gods. The sacrificial Brahmans had to place Candi, Paramesvar and Vishnu on carts or chariots and parade them. Mantras from the Rajamattam work had to be recited. Then once chapter of Sangha and twelve brahmans recited Sutta and Paritta. the ordination service too was recited. Finally, the sacrificial Brahmans recited the Shyindabhummicala verse full of propitiousness and sounded the conch. The timber, bamboo and canes for building the pavilions were sprinkled with consecrated water from the paritta vessels and the conch shells.

== Types of pavilions ==
- Sihasana – Lion Seat, which was draped in white and attended by paritta reciting Brahmans.
- Gajasana – Elephant Seat, decorated in red with sailors in attendance.
- Morasana – Peacock Seat, decked in brown looked after by asan.

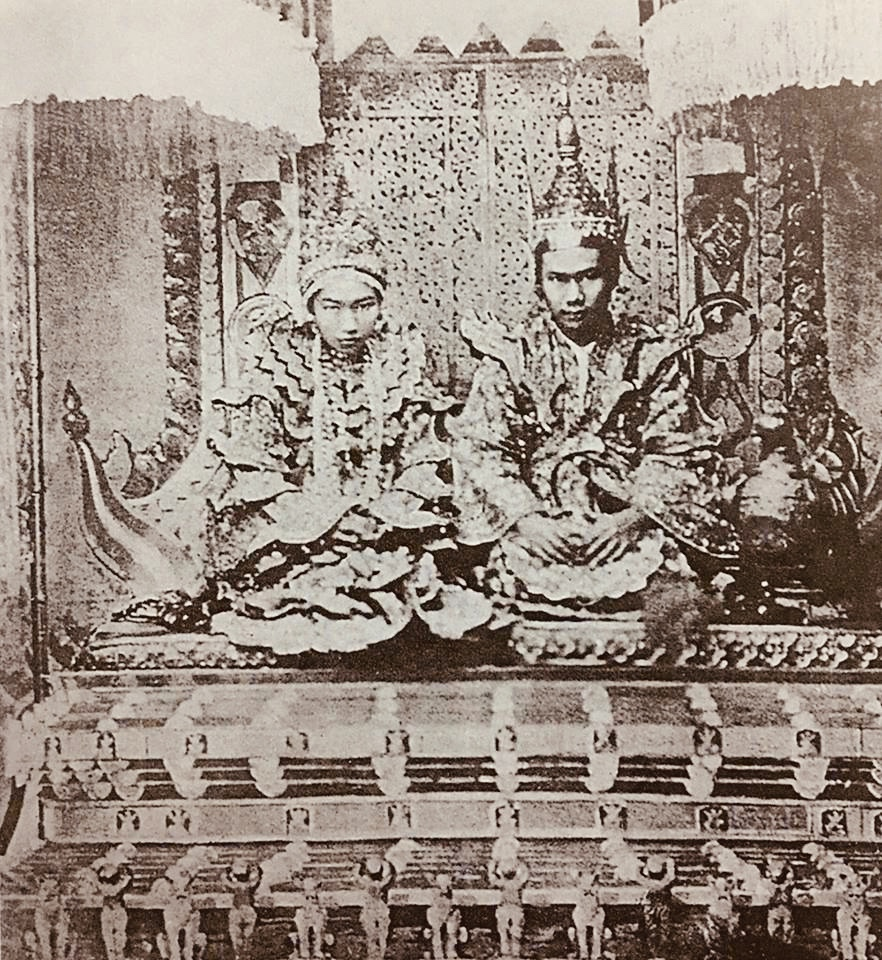
King Thibaw and Queen Supayalat on the Bumblebee Throne (Palin) at The Glass Hall, Mandalay Palace

== Carrying of water ==
When the time was auspicious, eight princesses of high lineage with gold pots, eight daughters of heredity consecration Brahmans with silver pots, eight amat (ministers) daughters of a long line of officers with earthen pots, eight daughters of heredity bankers with brass pots and eight daughters of hereditary rich men with iron pots in all their finery together with eight consecration Brahmans, Sasanapaing, four caravatin, eight amat, eight bankers, eight rich man, eight farmers and eight heads of san associations accompanied by music went to the river.

The water had to be taken from midstream thus the princesses and the women were embarked on boats of various ranks. When these boats left the shore, seven muskets were fired thrice, the sacrificial Brahmans blew their conches and the harpist Brahmans played on their instruments.

Some men of ferocious aspect were dressed as guardians of the river. When the water carriers arrived they had to bark out thrice sharply: "Why do you all come?" The purohita replied: "According to tradition, as in the case of his forbears, the King intends to hold an abhiseka ceremony. Thus have we come to draw water." They then question: "Will he work for the Religion, the Sangha and the people and act according to the law?" to which the purohita answered: "The King wishing to act thus wants the water. Thus the guardians exclaimed: "Very well! Very well! May the king live a hundred years and look after the interest of the Religion, Sangha and the People. May his children, grandchildren and great-grandchildren prosper."

When the guardians granted permission to draw water, offerings had to be made of gold and silver flowers, gold and silver parched rich, gold and silver nuggets, the nine gems, oil lights and chandeliers, betel and tea.

When the auspicious conjunctions was achieved seven muskets were fired seven times, the ten noises were sounded, the mantras from the vedas were chanted and the water was drawn. Then the return journey, on the arrival ashore seven muskets were again fired thrice and the processions wended its ways to the pavilions.

== Day of ceremony ==
At the auspicious conjunctions of the planets and the ten noises were sounded, fifteen muskets were fired seven times each and the king dressed like Brahma and the Queen like a Queen of the devaloka made a right royal progress to the pavilions. They were escorted by twelve (12) regiments in the van and twelve (12) in the rear in military uniform. Ministers of the left and right as well as the commanders of the guards accompanied them The above marcher on either side of the canopied way. On the covered path the King and Chief Queen in their state palanquin studded with the nine precious stones were preceded by one hundred consecration Brahmans headed by two cakravartin on each side, the Sasanapaing and the Chief Purohita Carrying a nine gems studded conch in a gold flower baskets in joined hands, the one hundred Brahmans astrologers headed by four (4) huratuin, one hundred sacrificial Brahmans, One hundred harpist Brahmans, One hundred paritta reciting Brahmins and One hundred flower offering Brahmans blew in the conch. They were followed by the water drawing eight princesses and other water drawing ladies.

When the King reached the pavilion, the muskets were fired again. The Sasanapaing and twelve purohita brought the Tipitaka to the Sihasana pavilion and left in there, and proceeded to the palace where 108 sanghas were reciting the paritta.

=== Bathing of the King ===
The King bathed his body in the Morasan pavilion, proceeded to the Gajasana and washed his head. Then he recited the verse:

Buddhañca, dhammañca, saṃghañca saraṇaṃ gato upāsakattaṃ deseti sakyaputtassa sāsano sadā guṇamupehīti

ဗုဒ္ဓဉ္စ၊ ဓမ္မဉ္စ၊ သံဃဉ္စ၊ သရဏံ ဂတော ဥပါသကတ္တံ ဒေသေတိ၊ သကျပုတ္တဿ သာသနော သဒါ ဂုဏမုပေဟီတိ

Having taken refuge in the Buddha, the Dhamma and the Sangha, he pointed out the fact of his being a lay-disciple. Always trust in the virtue of the biddings of the Sakyaputta.

He then proceeded to the Sihasana pavilion and sat in state on the gold covered figwood. The eight princesses dressed gorgeously and bearing each a clockwise conch studded with the nine gems filled with the water of the five rivers in joint palms stood in front of the king and respectfully poured water on his head one after the other saying while saying:

Oh King! please act always as the good and righteous kings from Mahasamata at the beginning of the world onwards. Oh King! do not be harsh to your vassals, bestow rewards on all deserving people love compassionately everyone as though they are children of your bosom, guard the welfare of everyone, treasure their lives as though your own May you be free of the obstructions of greed and anger, and give light to the darkness of stupidity. Oh King your actions must be only those that bring you credit, so must your words, your thoughts and zeal.

The original script in Burmese text is:

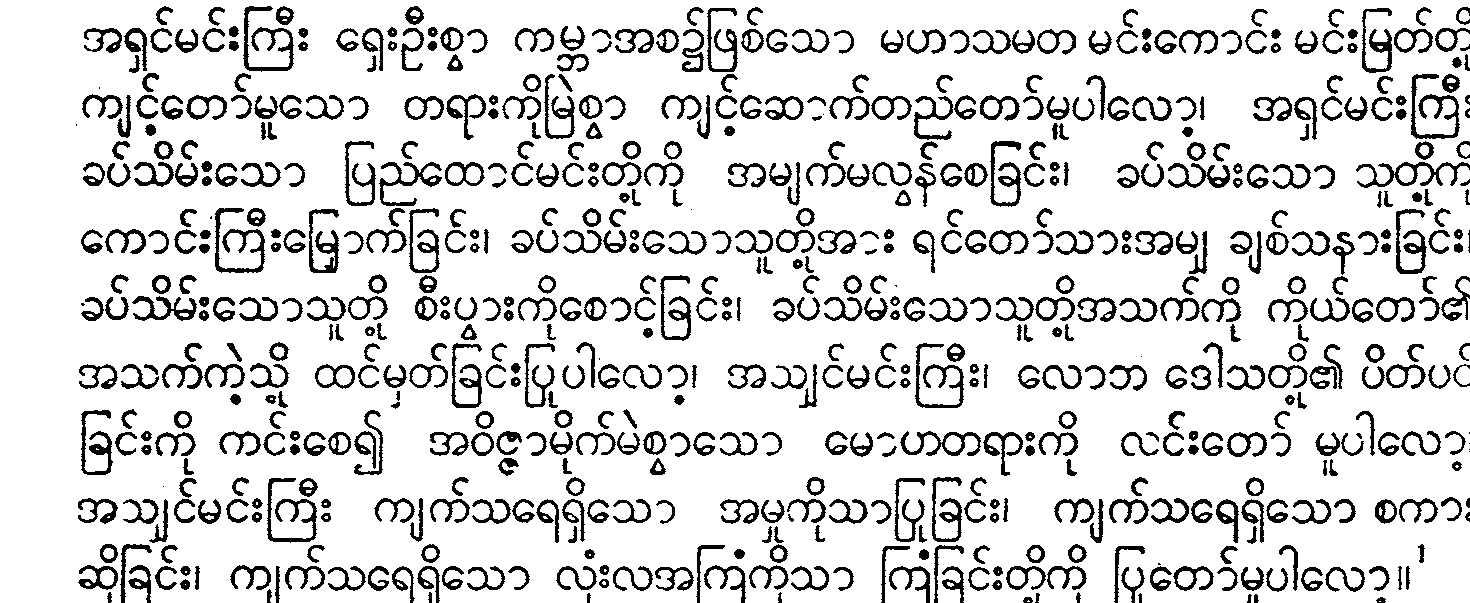

Then the eight Brahmans of pure blood bearing in their joint hands clockwise conches filled with water from the fiver rivers poured water over the consecration most respectfully on the King's head in turn saying the while:

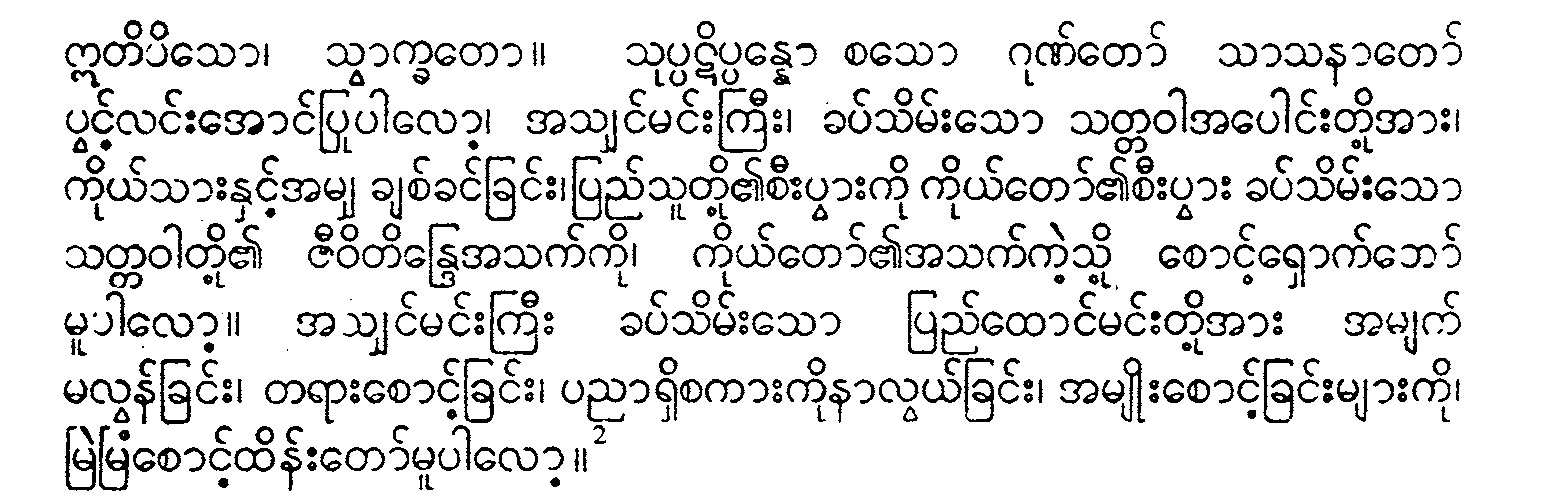

In translation:

Please make the Religion and its attributes shine forth. Oh King! love all beings as your own children, their weal and their lives must Oh King! do not be harsh to your vassals. Be just, attend to the sayings of the wise, and look after your kith be as your own. and kin. This you must always do.

The King, as an act of merit on his coronation, set free all prisoners except the enemies of the Religion. Then the King and his pageant returned to the Palace in the order already mentioned. As for the three ceremonial pavilions, they were dismantled and cast into the river. Seven days after the ceremony, the king and members of the royal family made an inaugural procession, circling the city moat on a gilt state barge, amid festive music and spectators. This in brief is the coronation abhiseka ceremony.

== List of coronations ==
Monarch	Reign	Coronation date	Royal style
Alaungpaya	29 February 1752 – 11 May 1760	17 April 1752	Sīripavara Vijayanandajātha Mahādhamma Rājādhirājā Mintayagyi (သီရိပဝရ ဝိဇယနန္ဒဇာထ မဟာဓမ္မ ရာဇာဓိရာဇာ အလောင်းမင်းတရားကြီး).
Naungdawgyi	11 May 1760 – 28 November 1763	26 July 1760	Sirīpavaradhammarājā (သိရီပဝရဓမ္မရာဇာ)
Hsinbyushin	28 November 1763 – 10 June 1776	16 May 1764	Sīrisūriyadhammarājadhipati Hsinbyushin but later Sīrisūriyadhammamahādhammarājarājadhipati (သီရိသူရိယဓမ္မမဟာဓမ္မရာဇရာဇဓိပတိ)
Singu	10 June 1776 – 5 February 1782	23 December 1776	Mahādhammarājādhirāja (မဟာဓမ္မရာဇာဓိရာဇ)
Bodawpaya	11 February 1782 – 5 June 1819		Sīripavara Tilokapaṇḍita Mahādhammarājādhirājā (သီရိပဝရ တိလောကပဏ္ဍိတ မဟာဓမ္မရာဇာဓိရာဇာ)
Bagyidaw	5 June 1819 – 15 April 1837	7 June 1819	Sri Pavara Suriya Dhammarāja Mahārājadhirāja but later Sīri Tribhavanāditya Pavarapaṇḍita Mahādhammarājādhirājā (သီရိ တြိဘဝနာဒိတျ ပဝရပဏ္ဍိတ မဟာဓမ္မရာဇာဓိရာဇာ)
Tharrawaddy	15 April 1837 – 17 November 1846	8 July 1840	Siri Pavarāditya Lokadhipati Vijaya Mahādhammarājadhirāja (သိရီပဝရာဒိတျ လောကာဓိပတိ ဝိဇယမဟာဓမ္မရာဇာဓိရာဇာ)
Pagan	17 November 1846 – 18 February 1853	27 February 1847	Siri Sudhamma Tilokapavara Mahādhammarājadhirāja (သိရီသုဓမ္မ တိလောကပဝရ မဟာဓမ္မရာဇာဓိရာဇာ)
Mindon	18 February 1853 – 1 October 1878	6 July 1854	Siri Pavaravijaya Nantayasapaṇḍita Tribhavanāditya Mahādhammarājadhirāja (သီရိပဝရဝိဇယာနန္တယသပဏ္ဍိတ တြိဘဝနအာဒိတျာ မဟာဓမ္မရာဇာဓိရာဇာ)
Thibaw	1 October 1878 – 29 November 1885 (Monarchy abolished)	6 November 1878	Siri Pavara Vijayānanta Yasatiloka Dhipatipaṇdita Mahādhammarājadhirāja (သိရီပဝရ ဝိဇယာနန္တ ယသတိလောကာ ဓိပတိ ပဏ္ဍိတ မဟာဓမ္မရာဇာဓိရာဇာ)
