= Anglo-Burmese people =

Ethnic group

- (United Kingdom) (Myanmar)
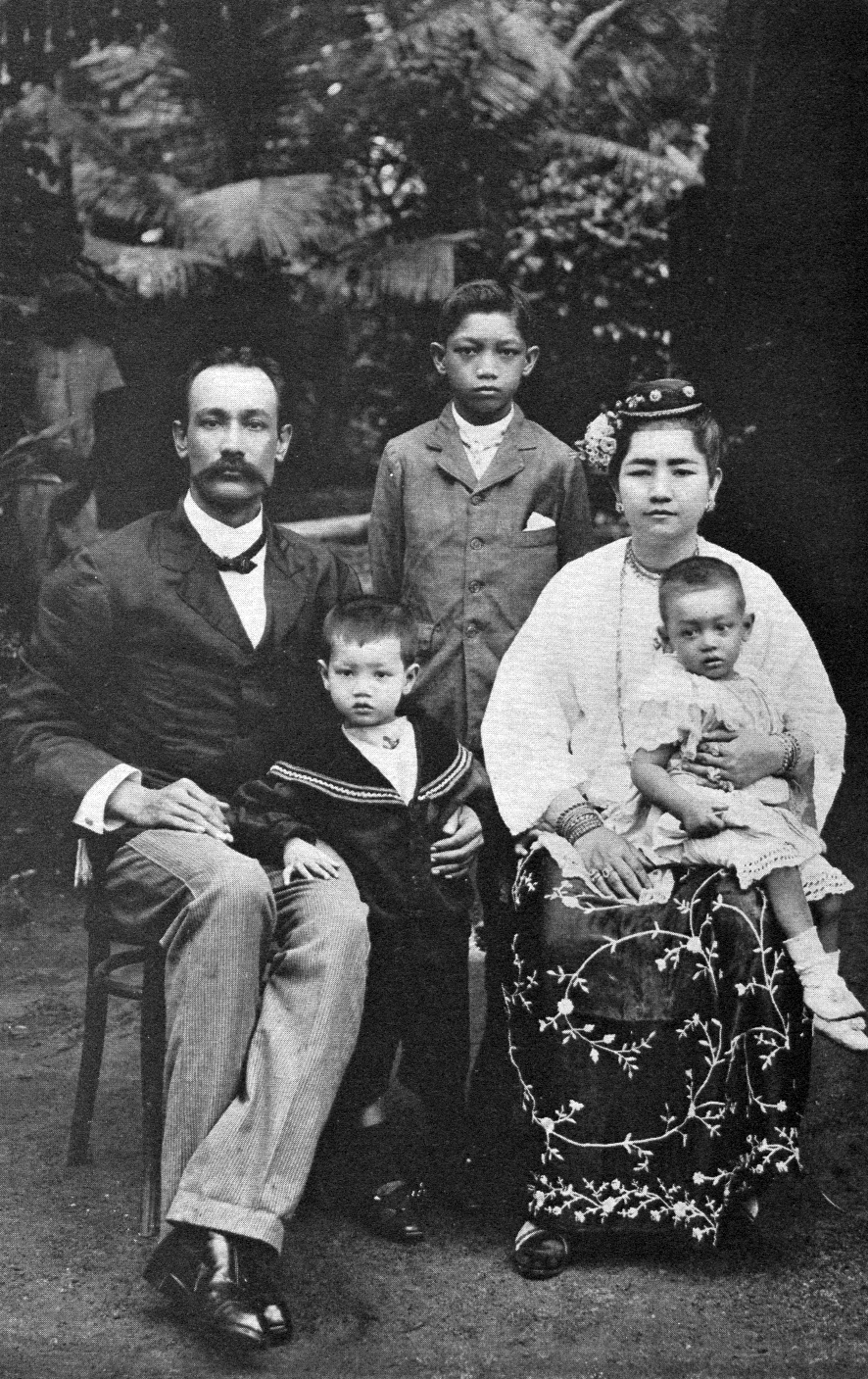
- An Anglo-Burmese family in 1904

Total population
- Myanmar c. 52,000, (worldwide-total unknown)

Regions with significant populations
- In Myanmar: Yangon and Mandalay; Worldwide: Australia, India; United Kingdom, United States

Languages
- Burmese, English

Religion
- Christianity

Related ethnic groups
- Anglo-Indians; Bamar people; British people; English people; Other minor ethnic groups of Myanmar

The Anglo-Burmese people, also known as the Anglo-Burmans, are a community of Eurasians of Burmese and European descent; they emerged as a distinct community through mixed relationships (sometimes permanent, sometimes temporary) between the British and other Europeans and Burmese people from 1826 until 1948 when Myanmar gained its independence from the British Empire. Those who could not adjust to the new way of life after independence and the ushering in of military dictatorship are dispersed throughout the world. How many stayed in Myanmar is not accurately known.

The term "Anglo-Burmese" is also used to refer to Eurasians of European and other Burmese ethnic minority groups (e.g. Karen, Mon, Shan, and Sino-Burmese etc.) descent. It also, after 1937, included Anglo-Indian residents in Myanmar. Collectively, in the Burmese language, Eurasians are specifically known as bo kabya; the term kabya refers to persons of mixed ancestry or dual ethnicity.

== History ==
=== Earliest settlement ===
The first "Euro-Burmese" community emerged in the early 17th century as the Portuguese and Bamar intermarried. This multicultural community was collectively known as the Ba-yin-gyi. The community was established near Syriam (modern Thanlyin) on the outskirts of modern-day Yangon. The settlement was founded by Filipe de Brito e Nicote. De Brito is said to have gone mad, having declared himself king of Lower Burma and captured Natshinnaung in an attack on Syriam, causing his outpost to be destroyed and himself executed by the Burmese king Anaukpetlun in 1613. Most of his small community of European settlers and their families were banished inland to Shwebo, then known as Moksobo; they were employed as gunners by the king and their descendants settled along the Mu River. When the British Burma Army was established in 1937, it was the Anglo-Burmans who comprised the only anti-aircraft battery.

Additionally, a band of French soldiers in the late 18th century by Alaungpaya, founder of the Konbaung Dynasty, was provided with Bamar wives and established a new Eurasian community French-Burmese. They were employed as elite gunners under Pierre de Milard. During the Mon-Bamar conflict in the 18th century, Sieur de Bruno was acting as a military advisor to the Mons and French warships participated in fighting against the Burmese in Syriam and Dagon.

From his two ships, Alaugpaya managed to put his hands on 35 24-pounder long guns, five field guns, 1300 muskets and a large quantity of ammunition. The French troops with their guns and muskets were incorporated in the Konbaung army as gunners and played a key role in the later battles between the Burmese and the Mons. They were treated well and received Burmese wives. They became an elite corps, which was to play an important role in the Burmese battles against Thailand and Qing China. One of them, Pierre de Milard, was ultimately nominated Captain of the Guard and Master of the Ordnance for the Konbaung Dynasty. When they reached old age, these French soldiers were able to retire to Shwebo villages with the spiritual support of a priest of the Catholic Church. To this day, some Catholic villages are still extant in the area where an awareness of some European ancestry remains.

=== British administration ===
The First Anglo-Burmese War formally ended in 1826 with the Treaty of Yandabo, which resulted in the coastal provinces of Arakan and Tenasserim being annexed by the British rule with Moulmein being established as the capital of the new colony. In 1852, the Second Anglo-Burmese War concluded with the annexation of the Bago Region to what became known as Lower or "British" Burma.

The Third Anglo-Burmese War began in 1886 after a number of social and legal issues combined with the revelation of a commercial trade agreement King Thibaw Min had made with the French.

Some European men took Burmese women as "temporary" wives, often abandoning them and their offspring after their tours of duty ended in Burma, not dissimilar to the Spanish and French practice of plaçage, but legal marriages did take place. Frequently, when a "temporary" relationship ended, the European father left behind a sum of money for the upkeep of their children. Sometimes the children were removed from their mothers and placed into convent schools run by Europeans, where their Burmese heritage was often undermined. The issue of mixed marriages, particularly between Bamar women and British males, was to become a major issue in the independence movement as it further developed.

Anglo-Burmans represent a diverse heritage, their Asian heritage primarily Bamar, but also Karen, Shan and Mon as well as other smaller Burmese ethnic groups like the Kuki, Jingpo and Rakhine.

The European element included, aside from the English, other European influence, chiefly Greeks, the Dutch, Scandinavians, Irish (who left their country due to the Great Famine), Germans, Austrians, the French, the Portuguese, Italians and other non-European Russians. Armenians, Syrian, Egyptians and the Anglo-Indian were also represented among Anglo-Burmans.

One unusual addition to the mix was Baghdadi Jews. By the 1920s, the Anglo-Burman community was a distinct ethnic group in Burma.

In 1935, colonial Burma was plagued with riots due to the country having been absorbed into the Indian Empire. In response, in 1937, as Burma separated officially from the Raj and formed a separate crown colony, Anglo-Burmans were officially recognised as an ethnic group under the Government of Burma Act. Having European blood, Anglo-Burmans were a privileged class and became one of the dominant ethnic groups in Burmese life. They began assimilating to European customs with vigour. Most Anglo-Burman were able to trace at least a grandparent, if not a parent, originating from outside of Burma's borders. As such, the connection with the West was strong, and many Anglo-Burmans did not settle down as a truly Burmese ethnic group. Of course, some Anglo-Burmans did, and most of the community felt Burma was their own country, with no wish to "repatriate" back to their European homeland. In fact, after Independence, the Anglo-Burman Union carried out research among the community to gauge the feeling of its people with regard to nationality. It was discovered that around 60% intended to remain in Burma and take Burmese citizenship with the remaining 40% split between staying in Burma or leaving for Australia or the UK.

Along with the British immigrants to Burma, Anglo-Indians came into Burma during the colonial era to work on the railways and customs departments; intermarriage between the groups (Anglo-Indian and Anglo-Burmese) was frequent, especially in Yangon ("Rangoon") as both communities were innately drawn to one another. Community clubs were a mainstay of life during British rule, with most attending what was commonly called the "Anglo-Indian/Domiciled European Club".

Between 1935 and 1948, Burma quickly became the jewel of the East, with a flourishing economy based on agricultural produce (primarily rice, oil, timber, gems and other natural resources). At this time, Rangoon was said to be the most cosmopolitan city east of the Suez Canal; the city and its environs were estimated to hold at least 50% of the Anglo-Burmese community. During British rule, Yangon and Maymyo (modern Pyin Oo Lwin) became principal population centres for the Anglo-Burmese, although substantial communities existed in the Irrawaddy River delta towns as well as in Mandalay, Mawlamyine, Amherst (now Kyaikkami), Taunggyi, Kalaw, Taungoo, Pyinmana, Meiktila, Yenangyaung and the mining towns of the Shan States.

=== Japanese occupation and Allied liberation ===
In 1942, the Japanese invaded East and Southeast Asia, including Burma, in hopes of creating an Empire for itself throughout Asia. Because of their European connections and appearance and fearful of Japanese rule, most Anglo-Burmans began making frantic preparations to leave the country for safety in India alongside the retreating British forces. A vast majority of Anglo-Burmans made their way out of Burma by their own means, some by sea and others by air. Many were employed by government departments or were married to government employees and were able to flee on official evacuation convoys. Others stayed at their posts and ran the telegraphs and phone operations, railways and other infrastructure systems until it was too late to escape. Sadly, of those who were left behind, many opted to walk through the jungles to safety in India. This exodus has become historically known as "The Trek", and many Anglo-Burmans alongside Europeans, Indians and Chinese died en route. Those who remained behind suffered horrendously.

Many Anglo-Burmese during colonial times were concentrated in and around the town of Maymyo. As the Japanese took control of the country, they found many there and simply incarcerated them in concentration camps for fear of their loyalty to the British. However, Anglo-Burmese who resembled Bamar were incognito and managed to pass, acting like the Burmans. Indeed, many Bamar sheltered their Eurasian friends and relatives from the Japanese and after the war, many Anglo-Burmans were not to forget this, refusing to take back their European names and dress, appreciative of the security and protection offered to them, and disgraced with the manner in which the British handled the evacuation of the country and the abandonment of the community. Others less fortunate during the war were interned in prison camps, whilst others, particularly the Anglo-Burman women, were taken as servants and mistresses by the Japanese army, most often unwillingly. In 1944, Burma's colonial government met in exile at Simla, India. Among those who attended were the governor of Burma, Sir Reginald Dorman Smith, along with Anglo-Burman leaders (including James Barrington who was to become the first ambassador for post-independence Burma to the US and Canada), to discuss the future of Burma after the war and the status of the Anglo-Burmese community. After Japan was defeated, most Anglo-Burmans who had fled to India returned to Burma.

=== Simla Conference 1944 ===
Sir Reginald Dorman-Smith, governor of Burma in exile, met Anglo-Burmese leaders in Simla in 1944, where the government of Burma in exile was stationed during the war, to discuss the future of the Anglo-Burmese community after the war.

The Anglo-Burmese delegates were:

- Mr G. Kirkham
- Mr H.J. Mitchell BFrS
- Mr J. Barrington ICS
- Mr K.W. Foster BCS
- Mr E.A. Franklin ICS
- Mr W.A. Gibson
- Mrs K. Russell
- Mr H. Elliott
- Mr C.H. Campagnac
- Mr J.A. Wiseham
- Mr J. F. Blake.

One of the results of the conference was the giving of an assurance to the Anglo-Burmese community that they would be allowed to preserve their freedom of worship and allowed to teach their own religion, freedom to continue their own customs and maintain their own language of English. In the Constituent Assembly of 1947, Anglo-Burmans were to receive four assigned seats in the new parliament of independent Burma.

=== Post-independence ===
On 4 January 1948, the Union of Burma declared its independence from the United Kingdom, immediately leaving the Commonwealth and severing all ties with the British Empire. The British left protection clauses in the Constitution and the legislative makeup of independent Burma to take account of the Anglo-Burman people including, most importantly, reserved seats in the Parliament of the newly established Union of Burma and a disproportionate number of Anglo-Burmans running the bureaucracy of day-to-day government and military operations. Aung San addressed the Anglo-Burman Union to press the issue of acceptance and the fears the community had for their presence in independent Burma. His assurances went to help with the decision by most of the community to remain in Burma after British withdrawal.

However, Aung San and his entire cabinet were assassinated before independence could occur. This sent a ripple effect through the country and among all ethnic minority groups, who Aung San had personally addressed to reassure them of their place in the new country. In February 1948, ethnic rebellions immediately erupted throughout Burma, with the Kayin taking most of the central part of the country, including Mandalay. For a time, it was feared that Rangoon would fall to the rebels. Due to the insurrection and erupting civil war, there immediately followed, however, a stream of Anglo-Burmans leaving the country, who were fearful of what awaited them and the country since the end of British rule. At this time, about 30% of the population of Rangoon were reckoned as Anglo-Burmese. This proportion was to decline steadily through to the late 1960s.

Following the British withdrawal in 1948, some Anglo-Burmans left Burma, primarily for the United Kingdom. Many more remained behind in Burma and carried on with their lives. Through the 1950s, the situation steadily declined in the country, with armed insurrections and rebellions, principally among the Kayin people. Due to the perceived discrimination that the Bamar had faced compared to other ethnic groups in Burma, affirmative action of sorts was introduced by the government of U Nu in the 1950s, primarily due to the disproportionate control the Anglo-Burmans had in government departments and the running of the country. Many Anglo-Burmese began to lose their jobs, to be replaced with pure Burmans as the bureaucracy of the country became increasingly Burmanized. Additional measures relating to the Burmese language were introduced so that to take the matriculation exam to enter Rangoon University, prospective students were required to be fluent in written Burmese (which many Anglo-Burmans had not been taught), even though all books and most teaching were still carried out in English.

=== Military rule ===
In 1962 General Ne Win overthrew U Nu's government and established strict military rule. It soon became apparent that this new military government had other plans as a socialist, xenophobic and isolationist regime was born. Many more Anglo-Burmese left due to discriminatory measures taken against minority groups, particularly those the military deemed as the vestiges of the colonial period, specifically the Anglo-Burmese and the Karen. Anglo-Burmese already in the Armed Forces were dismissed and those who wanted to join were now barred. There were mass dismissals of Anglo-Burmese from the Civil Service in departments where they had previously dominated such as the Railways, the Union of Burma Airways, Customs Department, Division of Forestry and Mining and the Ministry of Posts and Telegraphs.

All schools were nationalised, the principal target being missionary schools, and English was no longer taught from kindergarten level. Standards began to fall in the education system and the previously highly esteemed University of Rangoon was closed for some time, after which the Rangoon University Student Union (RUSU), hotbed of the nationalist movement during the 1930s and 1940s, was broken up by the military. Once the university reopened its doors, English as the principal medium of instruction was abolished and foreign institutions no longer accepted degrees obtained from the university.

The Anglo-Burman Social Club in Rangoon was subsequently requisitioned by the military and turned into an officer's mess and the Anglo-Burman Union was banned. During this time, many Anglo-Burmans left for Australia and New Zealand, with small numbers emigrating to Canada and the U.S.A.

=== Present-day ===
Today, some people identifying themselves as Anglo-Burmans are believed to remain in Burma. Because of the similar heritage and roles played, and because Burma was part of the British Empire as part of India after the introduction of British rule, Anglo-Burmans were once counted as Anglo-Indians; today, Anglo-Indians accept Anglo-Burmese as their "kith and kin". World reunions of Anglo-Indians usually include many who would be classed more correctly as Anglo-Burmese, to reflect their Burmese blood.

== Notable diaspora ==
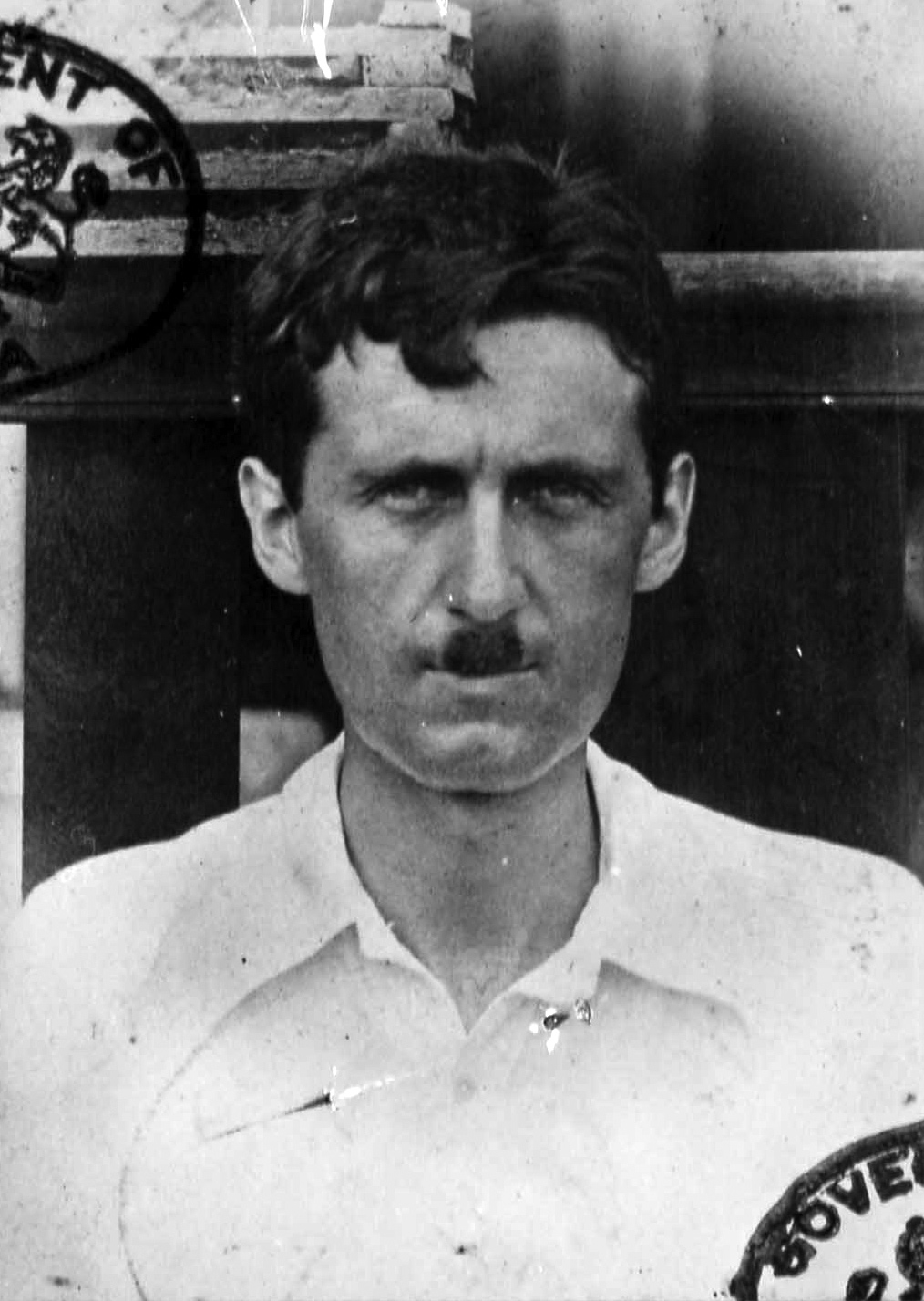
A passport photo showing George Orwell during his time in Burma.

The writer George Orwell was an Anglo-Burman by its original definition – he spent five years from 1922 to 1927 as a police officer in the Indian Imperial Police force in Burma, and wrote the book Burmese Days on his experiences as an Imperial officer in the country.

British writer Hector Hugh Munro, better known by his pen name Saki, was born in Akyab, British Burma, and like Orwell served in the Indian Imperial Police in Burma. Anglo-Burmese football player Fred Pugsley is considered as the first ever foreign footballer to play for an Indian club (signing with East Bengal in 1942). Gordon Samuel was another Anglo-Burmese footballer who represented the Burma national team.

The most famous Anglo-Burmans today are to be found outside of Burma's borders such as the Bollywood actress Helen, the late British television actor Richard Beckinsale, his daughters the actresses Kate Beckinsale and Samantha Beckinsale, British writer and journalist Sue Arnold, Japanese-British music critic Peter Barakan (ピーター・バラカン), the British TV personality Melanie Sykes, the jazz musician Jamie Cullum and his brother Ben Cullum and the singer Annabella Lwin. The alternative musician Get Cape. Wear Cape. Fly (né Sam Duckworth) is also Anglo-Burmese. The sons of Aung San Suu Kyi and Michael Aris, Alexander and Kim, are technically Anglo-Burmese, despite not stemming from the colonial era. There is also Zuleikha Robinson, a British actress raised in Thailand and Malaysia by a Burmese-Indian mother and an English father. American television host and liberal commentator Alex Wagner, who was born to a Burmese mother and a father of German and Irish descent, can be called Anglo-Burmese by basis of heritage. Burmese writer Wendy Law-Yone and her daughter Jocelyn Seagrave, who is a U.S. actress, are also Anglo-Burmese. Australian singer and former Xfactor contestant Reigan Derry is of Anglo Burmese descent.

However, there are also Anglo-Burmese people still living in Burma. They include the singer and actress Rita Fairmen (Myint Myint Khin), and famous singers Marie Conway (Tin Moe Khaing) and Joyce Win (Nwe Yin Win).

== Educational system ==
Anglo-Burmans were enrolled in missionary-run schools where English was the medium of instruction with Burmese as a second language. For some Anglo-Burmans who married full-blooded Burmese, their children, whilst still being counted as Anglo-Burmans, were usually more openly exposed to the indigenous culture and spoke and used the Burmese language more frequently than their more "Anglo" counterparts. Notable schools include:

- Cushing High School, Rangoon
- Methodist English High School, Rangoon
- St. Augustine's School, Rangoon
- St. John's Convent, Rangoon
- St. John's High School, Rangoon
- St. Luke's High School, Rangoon
- St. Mary's Convent, Rangoon
- St. Paul's High School, Rangoon
- St. Philip's High School, Rangoon
- St. Philomena's Convent, Rangoon
- St. Joseph's Convent, Mandalay
- St. Peter's High School, Mandalay
- Wesley High School, Mandalay
- Diocesan High School, Rangoon
- St Mary's Diocesan Girls High School, Rangoon
- St. John's Diocesan Boys High School, Rangoon
- Government English High School (GEHS), Maymyo
- Kingswood High School, Kalaw, Southern Shan State
- St. Agnes Convent, Kalaw
- St. Albert's High School, Maymyo
- St. John the Baptist School, Toungoo
- St. Michael's School, Maymyo
- St. Patrick's High School, Moulmein opened by De La Salle Brothers
- St. Joseph's Convent, Moulmein
- St. Augustine's School, Moulmein
- St. Agnes Girls School, Moulmein

== Community organisations in Colonial Burma ==
- Anglo-Burman Social Club
- Anglo-Burmese Association
- Anglo-Burman Union
- Anglo-Burman Council
- Gedhawk

== Present-day Anglo-Burman organisations ==
- Australian Anglo-Burmese Society
- Anglo-Burman Church Organisation
- The Britain-Burma Society
- Methodist English High School Alumni Association, Rangoon

== Resources ==
- Anglo-Burmese Society
- Sue Arnold. A Burmese Legacy.
- Maureen Baird-Murray. A World Overturned.
- Stephen Brookes. Through the Jungle of Death.
- F. Tennyson Jesse. The Lacquer Lady.
- Emma Larkin. Finding George Orwell in Burma
- Colin McPhedran. White Butterflies.
- Ethel Mannin. The Living Lotus.
- George Orwell. Burmese Days.
- Dutch Malaysian Eurasians
- Singapore Eurasian Association
- The Australian Anglo-Burmese Society (offering membership to Anglo-Burmans worldwide)
- Anglo-Indian Web
- An Address to the Anglo-Burman Union by Aung San, 1947
- The International Journal of Anglo-Indian Studies - research paper written on the Anglo-Burmese community
- The Anglo-Burmese Library. Resources for tracing family. Subscription area and public area (free of access). Public area includes the official records and lists relating to the evacuation of Burma in 1942 (The Trek) and a useful range of sample directories and other material.

== See also ==
- Mixed (United Kingdom ethnicity category)
- Burgher people
- Eurasians in Singapore
- Filipino mestizo
- Hafu
- Hapa
- Indo people
- Kristang people
- Luk khrueng
- Mestizo
