= M. Feraud =

French diplomat

M. Feraud was a French diplomat of the 18th century who went on a mission to resume official French East India Company contacts with Burma in 1769. He obtained a trade treaty, and the establishment of a French factory in the city of Rangoon.

== Embassy to Burma ==
The arrival of the embassy was facilitated by Chevalier Milard, a French officer in the service of the king of Burma, as Chief of the Guard. The king of Burma Hsinbyushin welcomed Feraud's embassy, and accepted Feraud's offer for trade, in exchange for the supply of guns and ammunitions. The king remitted a letter of agreement, which Feraud brought back to Pondicherry:

"I, the Emperor of Ava, King of Kings, omnipotent, inform you, that I have received the letter given to me by your ambassador, Mr. Feraud, with the presents, consisting of one piece of red velvet, one of black velvet, a third of yellow velvet, five pieces of gold and silver stuffs, five parcels of gold and silver lace, eight hundred and twentyfour small knives, a double barrelled gun, inlaid with gold, five hundred and twentyfive muskets, two hundred and eighty-six cannon balls, eighteen hundred musket balls, one hundred granades, a cask of flints, and ten barrels of gunpowder. I have also received the letter which your ambassador sent, and which has been interpreted

by Millard, my slave. I have received your ambassador in my golden palace.
With respect to the requests you make, I cannot grant you the island of Molucca, because it is a suspicious place: neither will I give up the five Frenchmen. You also mention their pay, and you ask for a person to settle their account: all this I leave to the disposal of Millard.
I exempt you from all duties, and grant you a free trade. I also cede to you that place to the south of Rangon, called Mangthu; the extent of the ground along the bank of the river is 500 Thas, and the breadth of two hundred, which the governor of Rangon will cause to be measured. All the French vessels that anchor in the port of the French settlement, shall be obliged to render an account of their merchandize and other effects to the governor of Rangon, in order to see what presents I should exact, to indemnify myself for the duties. No warlike ammunition is to be sold by you in my dominions, without my license. I have sent in consequence my orders to the governor of Rangon. When any French vessels arrive, he will take care to go on board, and as soon as the goods are in the warehouse, he will put the chap on them.

All French ships which anchor in the French settlement, shall be obliged to bring their rudders on shore.

I send you your ambassador, with the concessions I have made him.
Given the 12th of the Moon, of the month of Kchong, 1132".

— Letter by the king of Burma Hsinbyushin to the French East India Company, 1769.

Given the previous involvement of the French with the dissident Mon under Sieur de Bruno, the king of Burma clearly specified that French arm trade should involve him only. As a result of the embassy, the French obtained a large ground in Rangoon where they were able to establish warehouses.

== Works ==
- Feraud, M. "Journal du Voyage de M. Feraud au Royaume d'Ava." 1770

== See also ==
- France-Burma relations
