= France–Myanmar relations =

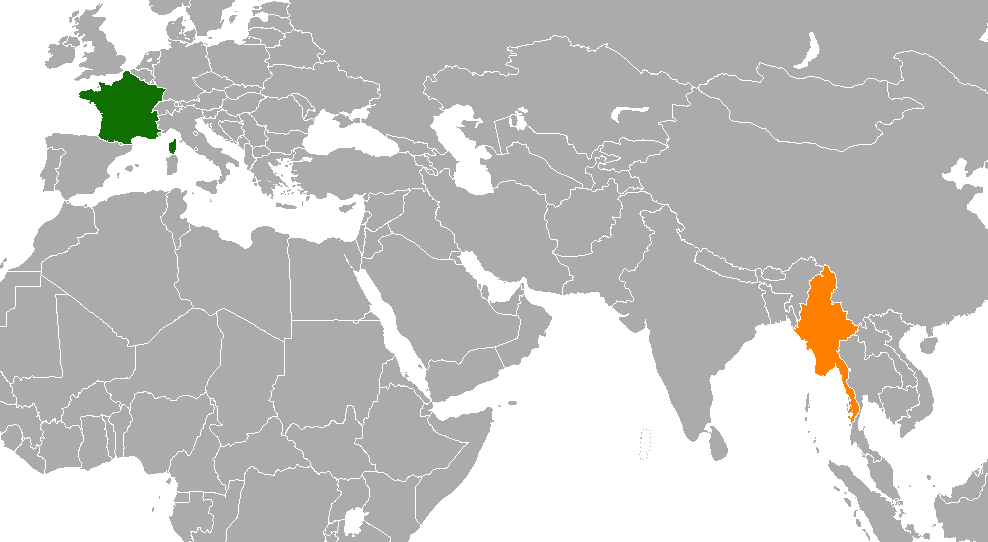
- France: Myanmar

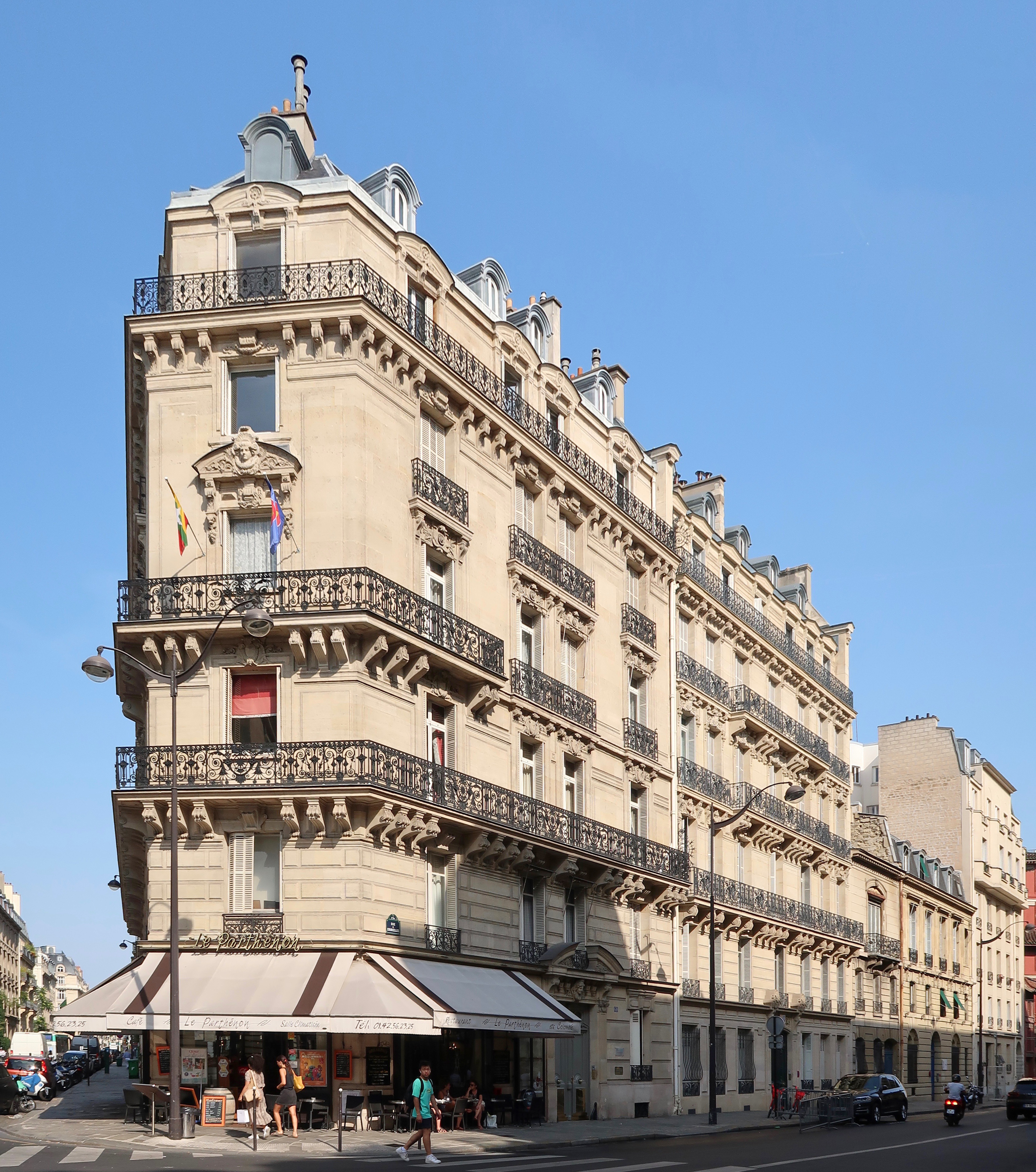
Embassy of Myanmar in Paris

France-Myanmar relations are the bilateral relations between Myanmar and France. Relations began in the early 18th century, as the French East India Company was attempting to extend its influence into Southeast Asia. France has an embassy in Yangon and Myanmar has an embassy in Paris.

== History ==
=== French shipyard in Syriam (1729–1742) ===
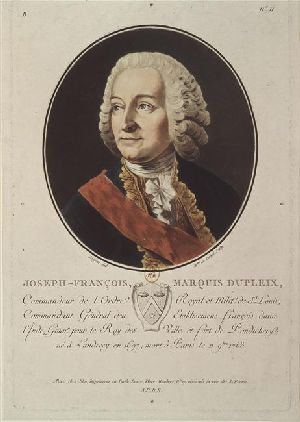
Joseph François Dupleix initiated French intervention in Burma.

The Governor-General of French India Joseph François Dupleix had started to show interest in Burma since 1727, on account of the country's abundance in teak and crude oil. As a result, a French shipyard was established in the city of Syriam in 1729, building ships for Pondicherry. The shipyard was abandoned in 1742 due to the revolt of the Mon.

=== Intervention in Burma (1751) ===
A few years later, a Mon envoy visited Dupleix requesting French help in the fight against the Burmese. Dupleix promised men and munitions and dispatched Sieur de Bruno with the objective of developing French influence in the country. He arrived at Bago, Burma in July 1751. Sieur de Bruno reported back that a few hundred French troops would be able to take control of the Irrawaddy Delta, triggering an official request by Dupleix to the French court to obtain the necessary military support. Sieur de Bruno obtained a treaty and formed an alliance between France and the Mons.

Governor Thomas Saunders of Madras attempted to counter the French moves in the region by sending a military force to survey the island of Negrais under Captain Thomas Taylor. He also tried to negotiate the cession of Syriam to the East India Company. The Mons swiftly rejected the offer after listening to the counsel of Bruno, who had considerable influence at the Mon court and was especially on excellent terms with the Heir Apparent. Saunders finally decided to land at Negrais instead, occupying the island on 26 April 1753.

However, Dupleix's proposals to take control of the Irrawaddy delta were rejected by the French government, strongly limiting his capacity to intervene there.

=== Participation in the Burman-Mon conflict (1751–1756) ===
Following their 1740 revolt against Burmese rule, the Mon sacked Ava in 1752, and overran most of Burma, putting an end to the Toungoo dynasty. Soon however, the Burmese were able to repel the Mons under the leadership of Alaungpaya. The Mons had to retreat, as Alaunpaya first recovered northern Burma, capturing the city of Ava on 14 January 1754. By February 1755, Central Burma was secured. The Burmese soon threatened the capital of Pegu, as well as the city of Syriam.

In Syriam, Sieur de Bruno was helping the Mons in organizing their defense. Sieur de Bruno was insistently requesting more help from Pondicherry. He acted as a military advisor to the Mons, and French warships participated in fighting against the Burmese in Syriam and Dagon (ancient Rangoon).

Alaungpaya on the other hand was asking the British for guns and ammunitions. Alaungpaya managed to capture Syriam in July 1756. Sieur de Bruno and the other French with him were captured and tortured. Two French ships arriving two days after the capture of Syriam, Fleury and Galathée, with reinforcements and supplies were also captured by Alaungpaya, when Alaungpaya forced Bruno to write a letter to trick them. The French captains were killed and the 200 sailors forced to join the Burmese army Sieur de Bruno was roasted to death. From the two ships, Alaugpaya managed to put his hands on 35 ships guns (24 pounders), five field guns, 1300 muskets, and a large quantity of ammunitions. France was precluded from further intervention in Burma, with the advent of the Seven Years' War in Europe (1756–1763).

=== French elite corps ===
The French troops with their guns and muskets were incorporated in the Burmese army as gunners, and played a key role in the later battles between the Burmese and the Mons. They were treated well and received Burmese wives. They became an elite corps, which was to play an important role in the Burmese battles against the Siamese and the Manchus. One of them, the Chevalier Milard, was ultimately nominated Captain of the Guard and Master of the Ordnance for the Konbaung dynasty.

When they reached old age, the French soldiers were able to retire Shwebo villages, with the spiritual support of a priest. To this day, some Catholic villages are still extant in the area where an awareness of some European ancestry remains.

=== Resumption of official contacts (1769) ===
In 1769, a French embassy led by M. Feraud was sent to resume official French East India Company contacts with Burma. He obtained a trade treaty, and the establishment of a French factory in the city of Rangoon.

The arrival of the embassy was facilitated by Chevalier Milard. The king of Burma Hsinbyushin welcomed Feraud's embassy, and accepted Ferraud's offer for trade, in exchange for the supply of guns and ammunitions. The king remitted a letter of agreement, which Feraud brought back to Pondicherry.

Given the previous involvement of the French with the dissident Mon under Sieur de Bruno, the king of Burma clearly specified that French arm trade should involve him only. As a result of the embassy, the French obtained a large ground in Rangoon where they were able to establish warehouses.

=== Franco-British rivalry (19th century) ===
With the advent of the French Revolution in 1789 and the rise of Napoleon, France became less capable of involvement in faraway theaters such as Burma. Great Britain on the contrary was able to increase its influence, leading to the First Anglo–Burmese War (1823–1826) and the incorporation of the Burmese Empire into the British Empire. After the Second Anglo-Burmese War (1852), the United Kingdom annexed Lower Burma.

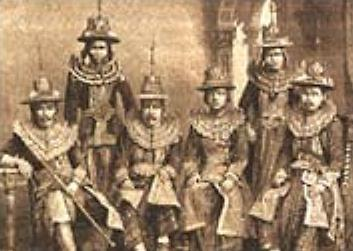
19th century Burmese mission to France.

In 1872, king Mindon sent an embassy to Europe, led by his confidant, the Kinwun Mingyi, leading to the signature of a commercial treaty with France on 24 January 1873. Further, in 1883, king Thibaw Min attempted to break the stalemate with Great Britain by trying to establish an alliance with France to obtain recognition and aid. This led to strong tensions between France and Great Britain. In the end, in spite of the dispatch of a Burmese mission to Paris, France refused in 1884 to sign a treaty promising that France would come to the support of Burma in case a third power would attack it, only suggesting the possibility of arm shipments from Tonkin. In 1885, the French consul M. Hass moved to Mandalay and negotiated the establishment of a French Bank in Burma, a concession for a railway from Mandalay to the northern border of British Burma and a French role in running monopolies controlled by the Burmese government. A secret treaty signed between Hass and king Thibaw was disclosed. The British reacted diplomatically. Charles Bernard, the Chief Commissioner of Lower Burma, warned that "if Ava refuses to stop the treaty, annexation will be inevitable".

The French government recalled Haas, who was removed allegedly "for reasons of health". While the French had backed down in Burma, the French actions as well as many other events nevertheless convinced the British to finally annex Upper Burma. Finally, the Third Anglo-Burmese War (1885), staged while France was occupied with the Sino-French war (1884–1885), resulted in the annexation of Upper Burma by Great Britain.

With the completion of British rule in Burma, French interest in Burma would become almost non-existent, while France would concentrate in the establishment of French Indochina from the second half of the 19th century.

=== 20th century ===
Following the end of World War II, ambassador-level diplomatic relationships between France and Burma were established in 1948, soon after the Burmese nation became an independent republic on 4 January 1948, as Union of Burma, with Sao Shwe Thaik as its first President and U Nu as its first Prime Minister.

== Modern relations ==
Since the 2021 Myanmar coup d'état, the French Government has strongly condemned the ruling junta and "the systematic dismantling of the rule of law in Burma that has taken place since the coup d'état.".

On June, 7, 2022 Myanmar's junta expressed strong displeasure at a French embassy statement calling it an "illegitimate military regime", warning of potential harm to bilateral relations.

In September 2023, France pledges to support international efforts for justice and accountability in the Gambia v. Myanmar case at the International Court of Justice.

== Economic relations ==
Trade between France and Myanmar has increased significantly since 2012: French exports to Myanmar rose from €19 million in 2012 to €129 million in 2017 and imports from €66.1 million to €224 million. In 2018, France was the 12th largest investor in Myanmar.

In January 2022, French oil giant TotalEnergies announced it would be withdrawing from Myanmar over "worsening human rights abuses".

== High level visits ==
In July 2013, Myanmar President Thein Sein met French President François Hollande in Paris. This was the first ever visit of a Myanmar head of state to France.

In June 2016, French Minister for Foreign Affairs and International Development Jean-Marc Ayrault visited Myanmar.

In July 2017, French Trade Minister Nicole Bricq visited Myanmar.

== See also ==
- Foreign relations of France
- Foreign relations of Myanmar
