= Basic Education High School No. 16 Mandalay =

B.E.H.S No. 16 Mandalay
- အ.ထ.က (၁၆) မန္တလေး

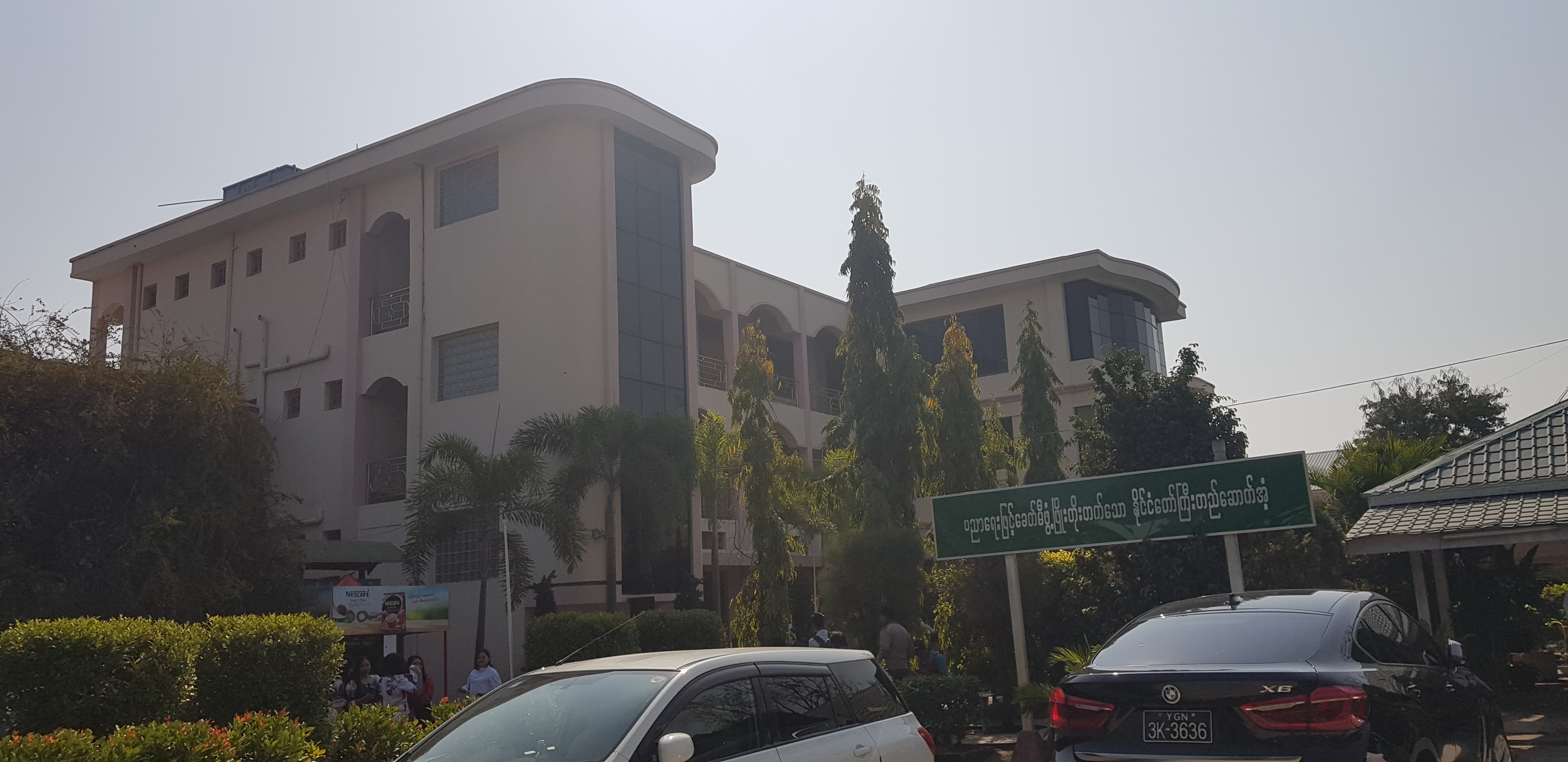

Location
- 28th Street & 68th Street, Chanayethazan Township; Mandalay, Mandalay Region; Myanmar
- Coordinates: 21°58′42.8″N 96°6′10.4″E

Information
- Type: Public
- Established: 1965
- School number: 16
- Principal: Than Htike Soe
- Grades: 1–11
- Enrollment: 5028 (2012–2013)
- Area: 4.2 acres
- Website: www.16behsmdy.net (archived)

Basic Education High School (BEHS) No. 16 Mandalay (Burmese: အခြေခံပညာအထက်တန်းကျောင်း အမှတ် (၁၆) မန္တလေး; abbreviated to အ.ထ.က (၁၆) မန္တလေး; formerly Wesley High School; commonly known as Mandalay 16 High School) is one of the best known public high schools in Upper Burma. The school is located at the corner of 68th and 28th Streets in Mandalay, south of Mandalay Palace, and offers classes from Kindergarten to Tenth Standard (or Grade 1 until Grade 11 in the new nomenclature).

== List of principals ==
- Kyan (1966–1969)
- Myat San (1969–1972)
- Kyaw Nyunt (1972–1976)
- Myint Myint Than (1976–1981)
- Saw Kyin Ohn (1981–1996)
- Mya Mya (1996–2001)
- Htay Aung (2001–2002)
- Htway Htway Than (2002–2012)
- Than Than Nwe’ (2012 October–2016)
- Tin Tin Aye.Dr (2016–2019 May)
- Thein Naing (Acting)(2019 June-27.11.2019)
- Than Htike Soe (28.11.2019–Present)

== Buildings ==
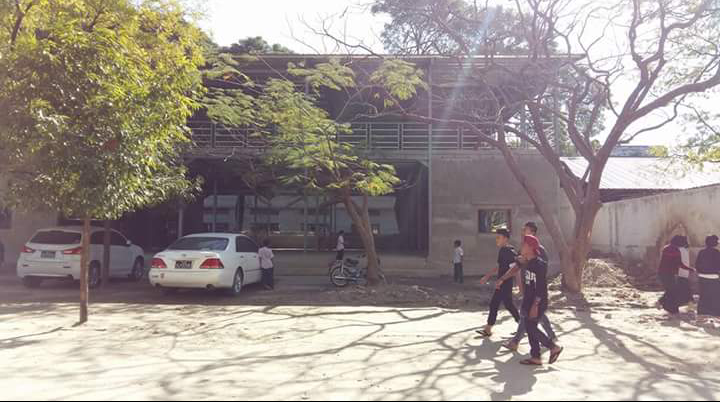
Canteen
