= Stephen Brookes =

English cricketer (born 1956)

Personal information
- Full name: Stephen Brookes
- Born: 12 September 1956 (age 70); Netherton, Worcestershire, England
- Batting: Left-handed
- Bowling: Left-arm medium

Domestic team information
- Years: Team
- 1981/82–1982/83: Eastern Province B
- 1979–1981: Staffordshire

Career statistics
Competition	First-class
Matches	4
Runs scored	5
Batting average	0.71
100s/50s	–/–
Top score	4
Balls bowled	468
Wickets	7
Bowling average	29.57
5 wickets in innings	–
10 wickets in match	–
Best bowling	2/26
Catches/stumpings	–/–
- Source: Cricinfo, 29 April 2012

Stephen Brookes (born 12 September 1956) is a former English cricketer. Brookes was a left-handed batsman who bowled left-arm medium pace. He was born at Netherton, Worcestershire.

Having played for the Worcestershire Second XI from 1976 to 1978, Brookes made his first team debut in county cricket for Staffordshire against Cheshire in the 1979 Minor Counties Championship. He played Minor counties cricket for Staffordshire from 1979 to 1981, making thirteen appearances for the county in the Minor Counties Championship during that period, with his final appearance coming against Northumberland. Brookes later played first-class cricket in South Africa for Eastern Province B, making three appearances in the 1981/82 SAB Bowl, playing twice against Boland and once Transvaal B. The following season, he made just a single appearance against Boland in the 1982/83 SAB Bowl. In his four first-class appearances for Eastern Province B, he took 7 wickets at an average of 29.57, with best figures of 2.26.
