= Pierre de Milard =

French soldier

- Born: 1736
- Died: 1778 (aged 41–42); Konbaung Dynasty
- Occupation: Military officer

Pierre de Milard (often referred to as Chevalier Milard, also spelled Chevalier Millard; 1736–1778) was a French Navy officer, who became a senior officer and noble in the Royal Burmese Armed Forces. He had a key role in supporting the Burmese military efforts against Siam and Qing China. He was greatly rewarded for his efforts and made the governor of Tabe. De Milard was very close to King Hsinbyushin. Suffering from a long illness in his last years, the Burmese king asked de Milard on a few occasions to sleep in the same room in order to guard against possible attempts on his life.

== Brief ==
In 1756, Pierre de Milard was a member of a French navy force of warships sent to Syriam to provide reinforcements and supplies to the forces of Hanthawaddy in the Konbaung–Hanthawaddy War. They were to join the garrison of Mon and French soldiers organized by French officer Sieur de Bruno.

The garrison held out for 14 months against the Konbaung siege. The city fell in late July 1756 after Alaungpaya sent in the "Golden Company", consisting of 93 volunteers, to carry out a surprise attack and open the gates. Sieur de Bruno was forced to write a deceptive letter calling for relief. Two French ships (Fleury and Galathée) from Pondicherry arrived with reinforcements and supplies on 29 July 1756. Some French officers (including Bruno) were executed and the rest forced to fight for the Burmese army. A large stock of firearms, cannons and ammunition were captured as well.

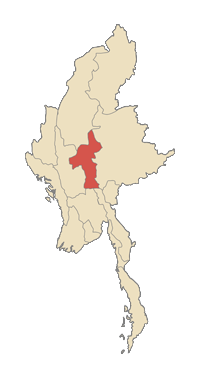
Chevalier Milard became Captain of the Guard for the Burmese king, and a baron in the Sagaing district.

Chevalier Milard was among the soldiers who were forced into the Burmese army. He was only 20 years old when he was captured. The incorporated French troops with their guns and muskets played a key role in the later battles between the Burmese and the Mons. They became an elite corps, which was to play a role in the Burmese battles against the Siamese (attacks and capture of Ayutthaya from 1759 to 1767) and the Chinese (battles against the Chinese armies of the Qianlong Emperor from 1766 to 1769).

Ultimately, Chevalier Milard was nominated Captain of the Guard and Master of the Ordnance for the Konbaung dynasty.

Milard was involved in the reopening of contacts between the Burmese and the French as Burma was looking for supplies of weapons for its conflicts with the Siamese and the Manchu Chinese. Commercial contacts resumed in 1770 and Milard arranged the visit of the French envoy M. Feraud and the re-establishment of the French shipyard in Rangoon.

Milard was very close to the Burmese ruler Hsinbyushin and for some time slept in the same room as him in order to protect him against possible attacks linked to a succession dispute.

Chevalier Milard was also noted for his charitable activities towards schools and churches, thereby promoting Western education in Burma. He died in 1778. He was buried near the village of Ngayabya in the Sagaing district. His tombstone, written in Latin and Burmese was transferred by the Archaeological Department of Burma in 1924 for preservation. His tombstone records that he fought for the Burmese kings in his campaigns against Hanthawaddy Pegu, Ayutthaya and Manipur as "Captain of the Feringhis" ("Captain of the French"), with the title of Thiri Yazathu Khyawhthin, baron (myosa) of Tabe in the Sagaing district.

== See also ==
- France-Burma relations
