= Sue Arnold =

British journalist

Sue Arnold is a British journalist, who writes or has written for both The Observer and The Guardian.

Since losing her sight as a result of a medical condition (retinitis pigmentosa, RP) her writing has often been related to radio criticism and reviewing of audio books. Her mother was Burmese and her father British and she was raised in both Burma and the UK.

She has written about her medicinal use of cannabis and expressed views first in favour and subsequently against liberalising its use.

She has also written a memoir of her search for information about her maternal grandparents, A Burmese Legacy.

== Books ==
- Arnold, Sue (1985). Curiouser and Curiouser: The Best of Sue Arnold. London, UK: Constable & Co. ISBN 978-0-09466-660-3.
- Arnold, Sue (1996). A Burmese Legacy: Rediscovering My Family. London, UK: Hodder & Stoughton. ISBN 978-0-34041-609-9.
