= Sieur de Bruno =

French diplomat

- Occupation: Diplomat

The Sieur de Bruno (or Sieur Bruno, often misspelled Bourno in English works) was a French adventurer and diplomat of the 18th century. He took an important role in developing French influence in Burma, and in leading French efforts at supporting the Mons during their conflicts against the Burmese.

The Governor-General of French India Joseph François Dupleix had started to show interest in Burma since 1727, on account of the country's abundance in teak and crude oil. As a result, a French shipyard was established in the city of Syriam in 1729, building ships for Pondicherry. The shipyard was abandoned in 1742 due to the revolt of the Mon.

== Envoy in Burma ==
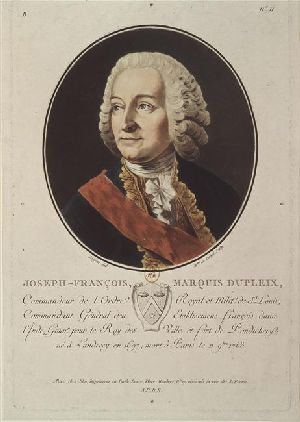
Bruno was sent to Burma by Joseph François Dupleix pictured above.

A few years later, a Mon envoy visited Dupleix requesting French help in the fight against the Burmese. Dupleix promised men and munitions and dispatched Bruno with the objective of developing French influence in the country. He arrived at Pegu in July 1751. Bruno reported back that a few hundred French troops would be able to take control of the Irrawaddy Delta, triggering an official request by Dupleix to the French court to obtain the necessary military support. Bruno obtained a treaty and formed an alliance between France and the Mons.

Governor Thomas Saunders of Madras attempted to counter the French moves in the region by sending a military force to survey the island of Negrais under Captain Thomas Taylor. He also tried to negotiate the cession of Syriam to the East India Company. The Mons swiftly rejected the offer after listening to the counsel of Bruno, who had considerable influence at the Mon court and was especially on excellent terms with the Heir Apparent. Saunders finally decided to land at Negrais instead, occupying the island on 26 April 1753.

However, Dupleix's proposals to take control of the Irrawaddy delta were rejected by the French government, strongly limiting his capacity to intervene there.

== Participation in the Burman-Mon conflict ==
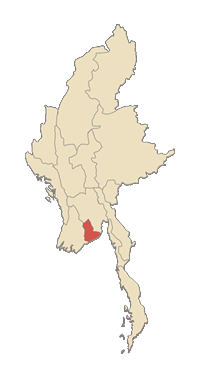
Bruno helped the Mons organize the defense of Syriam against the Burmese.

Following their 1740 revolt against Burmese rule, the Mon sacked Ava in 1752, and overran most of Burma, putting an end to the Toungoo dynasty. Soon however, the Burmese were able to repeal the Mons under the leadership of Alaungpaya. The Mons had to retreat, as Alaunpaya first recovered northern Burma, capturing the city of Ava on 14 January 1754. By February 1755, Central Burma was secured. The Burmese soon threatened the capital of Pegu, as well as the city of Syriam.

In Syriam, Bruno was helping the Mons in organizing their defense. Bruno was insistently requesting more help from Pondicherry. He acted as a military advisor to the Mons, and French warships participated in fighting against the Burmese in Syriam and Dagon (ancient Rangoon).

Alaungpaya on the other hand, successfully managed to capture Syriam in July 1756.Bruno and the other French with him were captured and tortured. Two French ships, Fleury and Galathée, with reinforcements and supplies were also captured by Alaungpaya, when Alaungpaya forced Bruno to write a letter to trick them. The French captains were killed and the 200 sailors forced to join the Burmese army Bruno was roasted to death. From the two ships, Alaugpaya managed to put his hands on 35 ships guns (24-pounders), five field guns, 1,300 muskets, and a large quantity of ammunition. France was precluded from further intervention in Burma, with the advent of the Seven Years' War in Europe (1756–1763).

The French troops with their guns and muskets were incorporated in the Burmese army as gunners, and played a key role in the later battles between the Burmese and the Mons. They were treated well and received Burmese wives. They became an elite corps, which was to play an important role in the Burmese battles against the Siamese and the Manchus. One of them, the Chevalier Milard, was ultimately nominated Captain of the Guard and Master of the Ordnance for the Konbaung dynasty.

When they reached old age, the French soldiers were able to retire in Shwebo villages, with the spiritual support of a priest. To this day, some Catholic villages are still extant in the area where an awareness of some European ancestry remains.

== See also ==
- France-Burma relations
