= Min Taya Medaw =

Min Taya Medaw မင်းတရား မယ်တော်

Queen of the Western Palace
- Tenure: 10 October 1581 – 19 December [O.S. 9 December] 1599
- Predecessor: Maha Dewi
- Successor: vacant
- Born: in or before 1553/54 (Note: According to the editors of (Minye Deibba 1967: 6), the poem Min Taya Medaw egyin describing the ancestry of the princess Min Taya Medaw was composed in 915 ME (1553/54). The egyin poems were usually composed in the same year or a few years after the birth of the poems' namesake royal child.) in or before 915 ME; Prome (Pyay)
- Died: c. 1610s Ava (Inwa)
- Spouse: Nanda
- Issue: none
- House: Toungoo
- Father: Thado Dhamma Yaza II
- Mother: Salin Mibaya
- Religion: Theravada Buddhism

Min Taya Medaw (Burmese: မင်းတရား မယ်တော်, pronounced [mɪ́ɴ təjá mɛ̀dɔ̀]) was a principal queen of King Nanda of Toungoo Dynasty of Burma (Myanmar) from 1581 to 1599. Nanda was her first cousin. The queen was described in a well-known eigyin-style poem/song by the famous poet Nawaday, who served at the Prome court. The king had no issue in her.

After Nanda lost power in 1599, she spent ten years in Toungoo in exile until 1610. On 4 September [O.S. 25 August] 1610, King Anaukpetlun, who had just defeated Natshinnaung, the self-proclaimed king of Toungoo, ordered that the queen, Min Htwe, and Natshin Medaw be sent to Ava (Inwa) with the full royal regalia befitting their former status.

== Ancestry ==
From her mother's side, she was descended from Ava and Prome royal lines. She was the younger daughter of Thado Dhamma Yaza II, Viceroy of Prome, and a niece of King Bayinnaung.

Ancestry of Queen Min Taya Medaw

8. Taungkha Min
4. Mingyi Swe
9. Kayenawaddy
2. Thado Dhamma Yaza II of Prome
10. Kywe Sit Min
5. Shin Myo Myat
11. (unnamed)
1. Min Taya Medaw
12. Thado Minsaw of Prome
6. Bayin Htwe of Prome
13. Myat Hpone Pyo
3. Salin Mibaya
14. Mingyi Swa of Prome
7. Shwe Zin Gon
15. Saw Myat Lay

== Bibliography ==
- Kala, U (1724). Maha Yazawin (in Burmese). Vol. 1–3 (2006, 4th printing ed.). Yangon: Ya-Pyei Publishing.
- Ni Ni Myint (2004). Selected Writings of Ni Ni Myint. Yangon: Myanmar Historical Commission.
- Than Kho, Shin (1615). Minye Deibba Egyin (in Burmese) (1967 ed.). Yangon: Hanthawaddy Press.

Min Taya Medaw Toungoo Dynasty Born: c. 1553 Died: c. 1610s
Royal titles
Preceded by Maha Dewi	Queen of the Western Palace; 10 October 1581 – 19 December 1599	Vacant
