= Minye Theinkhathu =

Minye Theinkhathu (Burmese: မင်းရဲ သိင်္ခသူ) was a Burmese royal title, and may refer to:

== Royalty ==
- Mingyi Swe, Viceroy of Toungoo (r. 1540–1549)
- Nanda Yawda, Gov. of Sagaing (r. 1574–1590s?), son of Thado Dhamma Yaza II of Prome
- Thalun, King of Burma (r. 1629–1648)

== Other uses ==
- UMS Minye Theinkhathu, first submarine of the Myanmar Navy
