= First Toungoo Empire =

Empire in Southeast Asia (1510–1599)

First Toungoo Empire တောင်ငူခေတ်
- 1510–1599
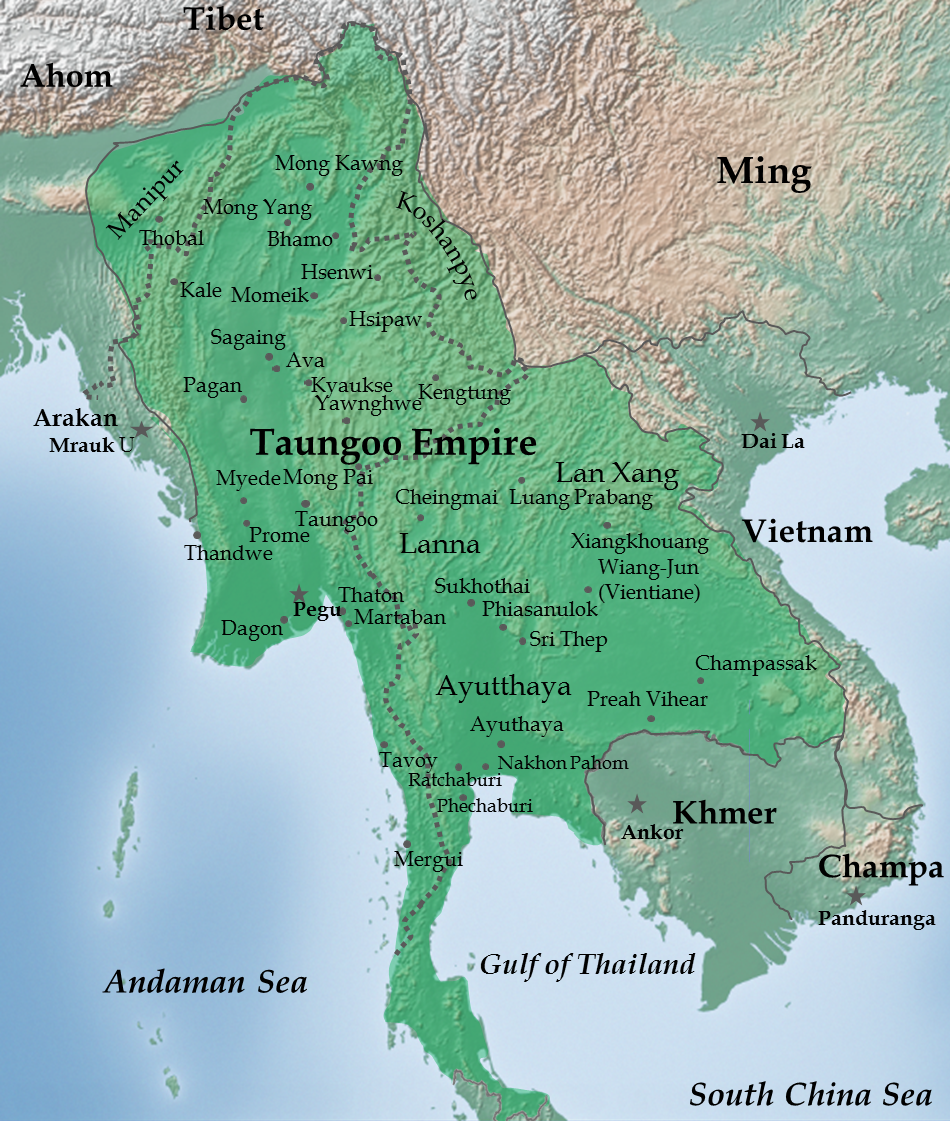
- Toungoo dynasty at its greatest extent (1580)
- Status: Empire
- Capital: Toungoo (Taungoo) (1510–1539); Pegu (Bago) (1539–1599)
- Common languages: Official; Burmese Regional: Siamese, Mon, Khmer (Siam); Mon (Lower Burma); Shan (Shan states); Yuan (Lan Na); Lao (Lan Xang); Meithei (Manipur)
- Religion: Official; Theravada Buddhism Minority: Animism; Christianity; Hinduism; Islam
- Government: Monarchy
  - 1510–30: Mingyi Nyo
  - 1530–50: Tabinshwehti
  - 1550–81: Bayinnaung
  - 1581–99: Nanda Bayin
- Legislature: None
- History
  - Toungoo dynasty founded: 1485
  - Independence from Ava: 16 October 1510
  - Rise: 1534–49
  - Expansion: 1550–65
  - Defense: 1568–76
  - Decline: 1584–99
  - Fall of Toungoo Empire: 19 December 1599
- Currency: Silver
Preceded by
Ava Kingdom
Hanthawaddy Kingdom
Shan states
Lan Na
Ayutthaya Kingdom
Lan Xang
Manipur Kingdom
Succeeded by
Taungoo dynasty
Ayutthaya Kingdom
Lan Xang
Manipur Kingdom
- Today part of: Myanmar; Laos; Thailand

The First Toungoo Empire (TOW-NG-oo; Burmese: တောင်ငူခေတ်, [tàʊɴŋù kʰɪʔ], lit. "Toungoo Period"), also known as the Second Burmese Empire in traditional historiography, or simply the Taungoo dynasty, was the dominant power in mainland Southeast Asia in the second half of the 16th century. At its peak, Toungoo "exercised suzerainty from Manipur to the Cambodian marches and from the borders of Arakan to Yunnan" and was "the largest empire in the history of Southeast Asia." The "most adventurous and militarily successful" dynasty in Burmese history was also the "shortest-lived."

The empire grew out of the principality of Toungoo, a minor vassal state of Ava until 1510. The landlocked petty state began its rise in the 1530s under Tabinshwehti who went on to found the largest polity in Myanmar since the Pagan kingdom by 1550. His more celebrated successor Bayinnaung then greatly expanded the empire, conquering much of mainland Southeast Asia by 1565. He spent the next decade keeping the empire intact, putting down rebellions in Siam, Lan Xang and the northernmost Shan states. From 1576 onwards, he declared a large sphere of influence in westerly lands—trans-Manipur states, Arakan and Ceylon. The empire, held together by patron-client relationships, declined soon after his death in 1581. His successor Nanda Bayin never gained the full support of the vassal rulers, and presided over the empire's precipitous collapse in the next 18 years.

The First Toungoo Empire marked the end of the period of petty kingdoms in mainland Southeast Asia. Although the overextended empire proved ephemeral, the forces that underpinned its rise were not. Its two main successor states—Restored Toungoo Burma and Ayutthaya Siam—went on to dominate western and central mainland Southeast Asia, respectively, down to the mid-18th century.

== Background ==
=== Name of the period ===
The polity is known by a number of names. The prevailing terms used by most international scholars are the "First Toungoo Dynasty"; the "First Toungoo Empire"; and/or the "Second Burmese Empire". In traditional Burmese historiography, however, the period is known as either the "Toungoo–Hanthawaddy Period" (တောင်ငူ–ဟံသာဝတီ ခေတ်), or simply the "Toungoo Period" (တောင်ငူ ခေတ်). (Note: Some historians of Burmese origin have used “Toungoo Dynasty” in English language publications to mean just the First Toungoo period as used in Burmese historiography. See (Aung-Thwin and Aung-Thwin 2012: 129) for example.)

Furthermore, in international usage, the terms "Toungoo Dynasty/Empire" cover both "First Toungoo Dynasty/Empire" and "Restored Toungoo Dynasty/Empire". Traditional Burmese historiography treats the Restored Toungoo Dynasty/Empire period as a separate era called the Nyaungyan period (ညောင်ရမ်း ခေတ်).

=== Place names ===
This article, for the most part, uses prevailing academic names for place names, not the current official English transliterations in use in Myanmar since 1989. For example, the official English spelling of the city after which the dynasty is named since 1989 has been "Taungoo", replacing the older spelling of Toungoo; likewise, the older spellings such as Ava, Pegu, Martaban are now Innwa, Bago and Mottama; and so on. However, the changes have not been adopted in international publications on Burmese history. (Note: See (Lieberman 2003), (Myint-U 2006), (Aung-Thwin and Aung-Thwin 2012). Even historians such as Michael Aung-Thwin and Thant Myint-U, who use Myanmar to refer to the country, nonetheless use older terms such as Ava, Toungoo, Pegu, etc.)

== History ==
=== Principality of Toungoo ===
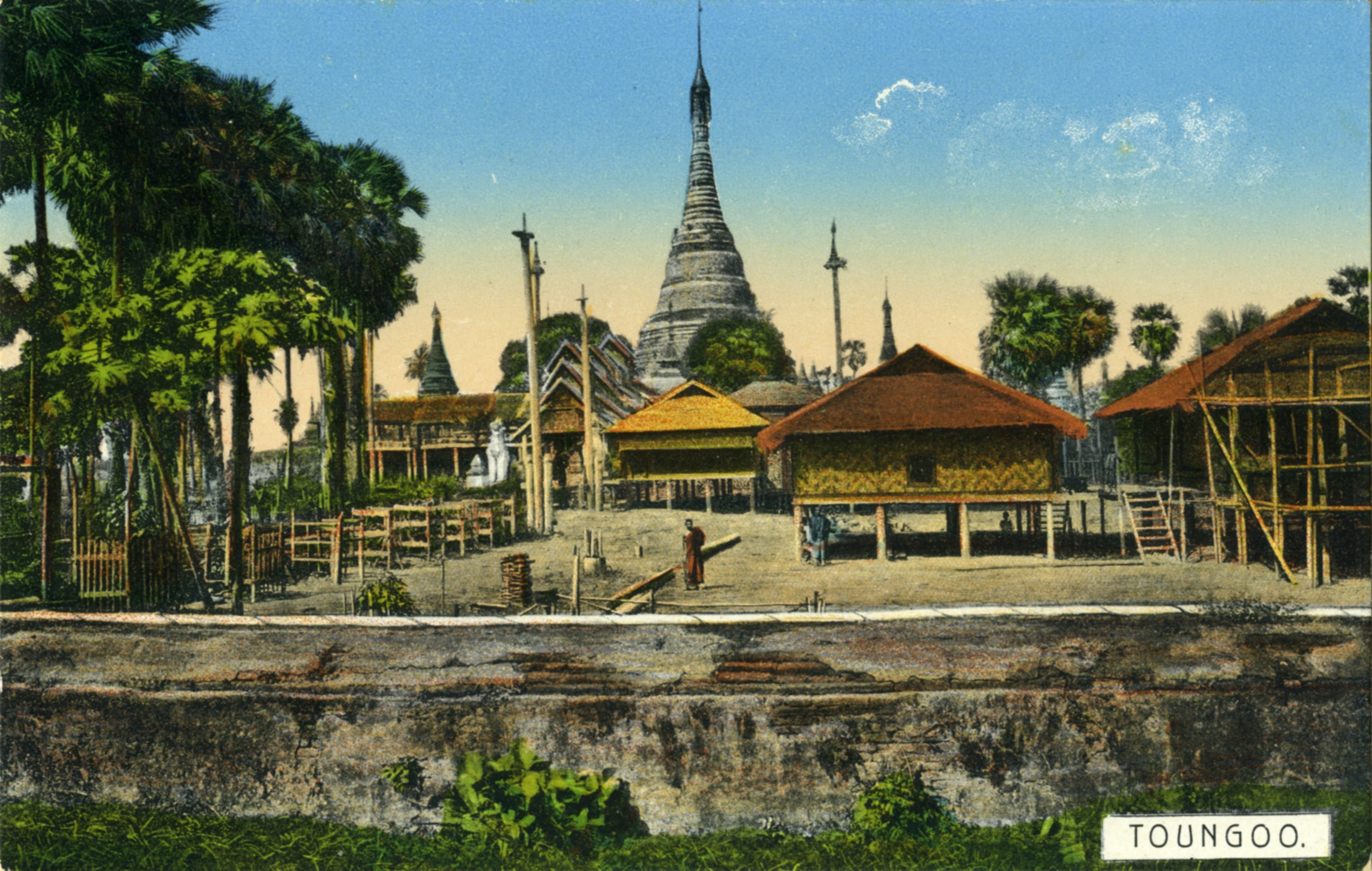
A depiction of old Toungoo (Taungoo) from a later period, though the 14th-century Toungoo might not have been much different.

The earliest known record of administration of the region dates to the late Pagan period. In 1191, King Sithu II (r. 1174–1211) appointed Ananda Thuriya governor of Kanba Myint. In 1279, two great-grandsons of Ananda Thuriya—Thawun Gyi and Thawun Nge—founded a new settlement of 370 households, about 40 km farther south. It was named Toungoo (Taungoo) (တောင်ငူ, "Hill's Spur") because of its location by the hills in the narrow Sittaung river valley between the Bago Yoma range and southern Shan Hills.

The narrow valley at the southern edge of the dry zone was not easily accessible from Central or Upper Burma; the best access to the region was from the south, via the Sittaung. Its hard-to-reach location would shape much of its early history. In the 14th century, the settlement grew to be the principal city of the frontier region, which remained a lawless place. Toungoo's first rebellion of 1317–18 failed but its nominal overlord Pinya had little control over it. Usurpers routinely seized office by assassinating the governor—in 1325, 1344 and 1347—without incurring any reprisals by Pinya. (Note: (Sein Lwin Lay 2006: 19–20): Pinya responded to the first assassination, of Thuwun Gyi in 1317 by Thawun Nge, by sending an army there. Even then, the army returned when Thawun Nge agreed to submit, and allowed Thawun Nge to remain in office. Similarly, later assassin-turned-rulers per (Sein Lwin Lay 2006: 20–22) may have nominally submitted to Pinya.) In 1358, Toungoo outright revolted. Pinya's successor Ava (Inwa) regained Toungoo in 1367 but gubernatorial assassinations continued: 1375, 1376 and 1383, at times with Ava's own permission. Only in 1399 could Ava impose tighter control.

By then, Toungoo, along with Prome (Pyay), had received waves of Burmese-speaking migrants, driven out of Upper Burma by the successive Shan raids in the second half of the 14th century, and both southern vassal states had emerged as new centres of economic activity as well as of Burman (Bamar) culture. Toungoo's growth continued especially after the Forty Years' War (1385–1424) left Ava exhausted. From 1425 onwards, Ava regularly faced rebellions whenever a new king came to power, who then had to restore order, often by war. Toungoo's “relentlessly ambitious leaders” repeatedly tested Ava's resolve by staging assassinations (in 1440, 1452, and 1459) and rebellions (in 1426–40, 1452–59 and 1468–70) at times with Pegu's help.

=== Start of Toungoo dynasty ===
In 1470, King Thihathura of Ava (r. 1468–80) appointed Sithu Kyawhtin, the general who put down the latest Toungoo rebellion, viceroy-general of the restive province. A distant member of the Ava royalty, Sithu Kyawhtin remained loyal to Thihathura's successor Minkhaung II (r. 1480–1501), who was greeted with a wave of rebellions by lords of Yamethin (1480), Salin (1481) and Prome (1482). Sithu Kyawhtin died in action at Yamethin in 1481, and was succeeded by his son Min Sithu.

In 1485, Min Sithu became the eleventh ruler of Toungoo to be assassinated in office. The assassin was none other than his nephew Mingyi Nyo (r. 1510–30). It would be yet another rebellion except that Nyo won Minkhaung's acquiescence by offering his full support to the embattled king. Nyo turned out to be an able leader. He quickly brought law and order to the region, which attracted refugees from other parts of Central and Upper Burma. Using increased manpower, he sponsored a series of elaborate reclamation and irrigation projects to compensate for the Sittaung valley's modest agriculture.

By the 1490s, Toungoo had grown, and a more confident Nyo began to test the limits of his authority. He built a new “palace”, replete with royal pretensions, in 1491. He then, without Ava's permission, raided Hanthawaddy territory, during the southern kingdom's succession crisis. It was a disaster: Toungoo barely survived the 1495–96 counterattack by King Binnya Ran II (r. 1492–1526). At Ava, Minkhaung ignored Nyo's transgressions for he needed Nyo's support against Yamethin.

=== Break from Ava ===
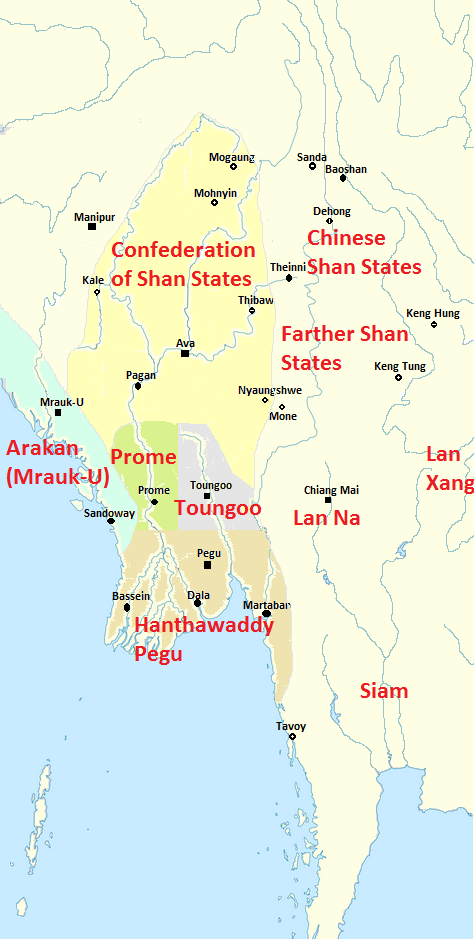
Political map of Burma (Myanmar) in 1530

Toungoo's inevitable break with Ava came soon after the death of Minkhaung II in 1501. The new king Narapati II (r. 1501–27) was greeted with a new round of rebellions. By 1502, Mingyi Nyo had already decided to break away despite Narapati's desperate attempt to retain his loyalty by granting the all-important Kyaukse granary. In 1503, Nyo's forces began surreptitiously aiding ongoing rebellions in the south. In 1504, he openly entered into an alliance with Prome with the intention of taking over all of Central Burma. But Ava was not yet a spent force. It decisively defeated the alliance's raids in 1504–05 and in 1507–08.

The setbacks forced Mingyi Nyo to recalibrate his ambitions. He formally declared independence from Ava in 1510 but also withdrew from participating in the internecine warfare. (Note: (Sein Lwin Lay 2006: 103–106): Though Toungoo stayed out of the warfare, for the most part, it continued to aid Ava's enemies. It even seized Yamethin and Taungdwin in March 1523. But Ava counterattacked and retook the lands in early 1526.) Ava could not and did not take any action. It was facing an existential threat in the ongoing war with the Confederation of Shan States, and would ultimately fall in 1527. In the meantime, Nyo focused on strengthening the economy and the stability of his kingdom. His policy of non-interference attracted refugees to the only region in Upper Burma at peace. By his death in 1530, Mingyi Nyo had successfully turned Toungoo into a small but strong regional power. History shows that the former vassal was about to "overawe the metropole".

=== Rise ===
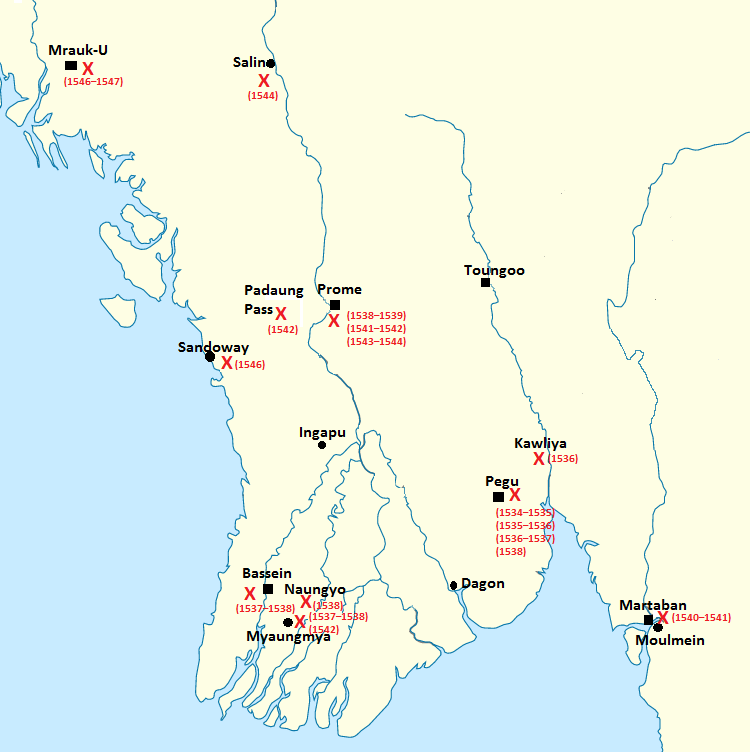
Toungoo military campaigns (1534–47)

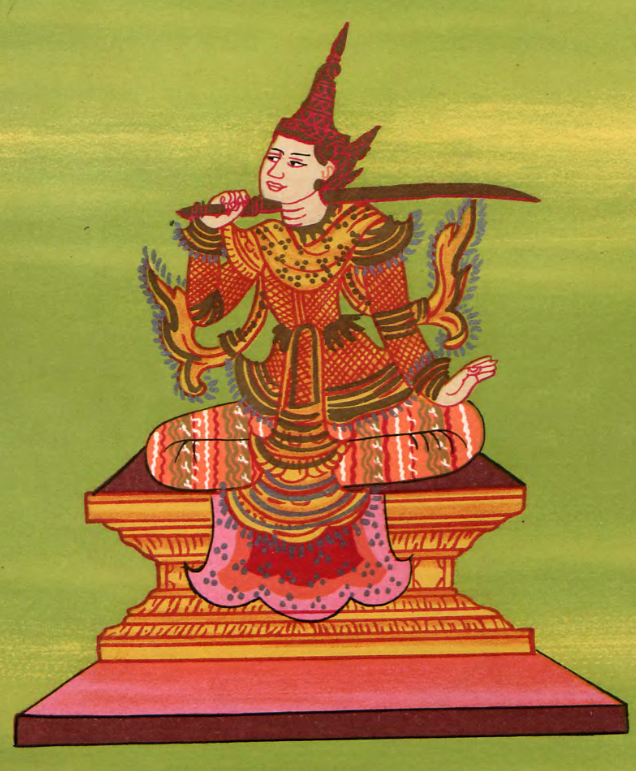
King Tabinshwehti depicted as the Tabinshwehti Nat

The period between 1526 and 1533 saw power change hands in all of the major states of Burma. Three of the states were succeeded by weak rulers: Taka Yut Pi (r. 1526–39) at Hanthawaddy; Bayin Htwe (r. 1527–32) and Narapati (r. 1532–39) at Prome; and Thohanbwa (r. 1533–42) at Ava (Confederation). Two of the states were succeeded by ambitious and able rulers: Tabinshwehti (r. 1530–50) at Toungoo, and Min Bin (r. 1531–54) at Mrauk-U (Arakan). Though Arakan would become a power in its own right, its geographic isolation meant it would remain a marginal player in mainland affairs. This left the tiny Toungoo, which would bring war to much of mainland Southeast Asia till the end of the century.

The initial impetus for Toungoo's military campaigns was defensive. The landlocked state was being encircled by the powerful Confederation, which by 1533 had defeated its erstwhile ally Prome. Fortunately for Toungoo, the Confederation's paramount leader Saw Lon was assassinated a few months later, and the coalition suddenly ceased to be a coherent force. Tabinshwehti and his court decided to take advantage of the lull, and break out of their increasingly narrow realm by attacking Hanthawaddy, the larger and wealthier but disunited kingdom to the south. In 1534, Toungoo forces began annual raids into Hanthawaddy territory. They finally broke through in 1538, capturing Pegu (Bago) and the Irrawaddy delta. In 1539, Tabinshwehti moved the capital to Pegu where it would remain until the end of the century.

Toungoo went on to conquer all of Lower Burma by 1541, gaining complete control of Lower Burma's manpower, access to Portuguese firearms and maritime wealth to pay for them. And Tabinshwehti would quickly exploit these newfound assets for further expansions. By incorporating Portuguese mercenaries, firearms and military tactics as well as experienced former Hanthawaddy military commanders to the Toungoo armed forces, the upstart kingdom seized up to Pagan (Bagan) from the Confederation by 1545. The campaigns against Arakan (1545–47) and Siam (1547–49), however, fell short. In both campaigns, Toungoo forces won all major open battles but could not overcome the heavily fortified defences of Mrauk-U and Ayutthaya.

Despite the setbacks, Tabinshwehti had founded the most powerful polity in Burma since the fall of Pagan in 1287. The king attempted to forge a "Mon–Burman synthesis" by actively courting the support of ethnic Mons of Lower Burma, many of whom were appointed to the highest positions in his government and armed forces.

=== Expansion ===
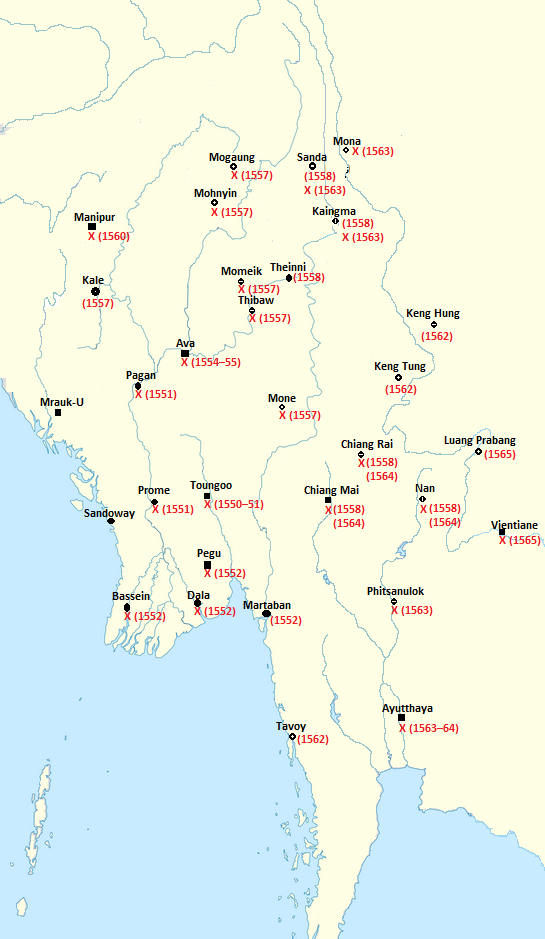
Major military campaigns and the expansion of Toungoo Empire (1550–65)

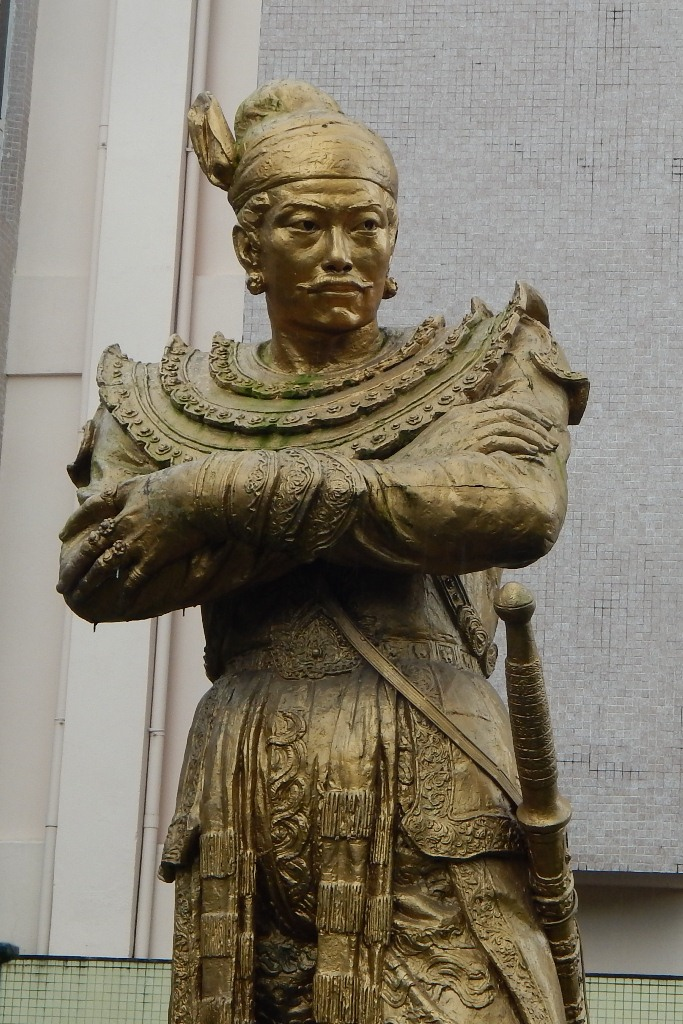
Statue of King Bayinnaung in front of the National Museum in Yangon

But the nascent empire fell apart right after Tabinshwehti was assassinated in 1550. Several vassal rulers immediately declared independence, forcing Tabinshwehti's chosen successor Bayinnaung (r. 1550–81) to reunify the kingdom in the next two years. Bayinnaung then pushed up the Irrawaddy in an effort to join Upper Burma and Lower Burma for the first time since Pagan. Victory in the north "promised to strengthen control over interior gems and bullion, and to supply additional levies." In 1555, Upper Burma fell to the southern forces. Over the next decade, a series of “breathtaking campaigns” reduced Manipur and the entire Tai-Shan world to tributary status: cis-Salween Shan states (1557), Lan Na (1558), Manipur (1560), Keng Tung (1562), the Chinese Shan States (1563), Siam (1564) and Lan Xang (1565).

The victories were enabled by a more martial culture and greater military experience of Toungoo armies, Portuguese firearms, and the greater manpower that came with each successive victory. The conquests ended at a stroke, over two centuries of Shan raids into Upper Burma, and "extended lowland control much farther than Pagan had dreamed possible:" Pegu now “exercised suzerainty from Manipur to the Cambodian marches and from the borders of Arakan to Yunnan.”

Bayinnaung's authority would be vigorously contested in the following decade. His forces never quite vanquished the Lan Xang resistance in the Laotian hills and jungles, and in 1568, Siam, the most powerful vassal state, revolted. Leveraging the manpower of much of the western and central mainland, he managed to defeat the Siamese rebellion with great difficulty in 1569. Yet defeating the guerrilla resistance at the remote hill states—Mohnyin and Mogaung in the extreme north also revolted in 1571—proved far more difficult. Toungoo armies suffered heavy casualties from disease and starvation in their fruitless annual campaigns in search of elusive bands of rebels. Pegu reestablished some semblance of control over Lan Xang only in 1575 and Mohnyin and Mogaung in 1576.

No sooner than the Tai-Shan world finally became quiet, the king turned his attention to Portuguese Goa and the advancing Mughal Empire in the west. In response to competing requests by the Ceylonese kingdoms of Kotte and Kandy for military aid, he finally sent an elite army in 1576 to Kotte, which he considered a protectorate, ostensibly to protect Theravada Buddhism on the island from the Portuguese threat. Goa considered it was technically at war with Pegu although no war ever broke out. Closer to home, he responded to the Mughals' 1576 annexation of Bengal by claiming the entire swath of lands in present-day northeast India, as far west as the Ganges and by sending an invasion force to Arakan in 1580.

Bayinnaung's empire was "probably the largest empire in the history of Southeast Asia," and what the Portuguese regarded as "the most powerful monarchy in Asia except that of China". The king standardized laws, calendars, weights and measurements, and Buddhist religious practices throughout the land. But he introduced administrative reforms only at the margins. The "absurdly overextended" empire was largely held together by his personal relationships with the vassal rulers, who were loyal to him and not to Toungoo Burma.

=== Decline and fall ===
In the tradition of the prevailing Southeast Asian administrative model, every new high king had to establish his authority with the vassals all over again. This was already a difficult task when vassals were situated in the same geographic region but nearly impossible with faraway lands, given inherent difficulties in bringing serious warfare to those lands.

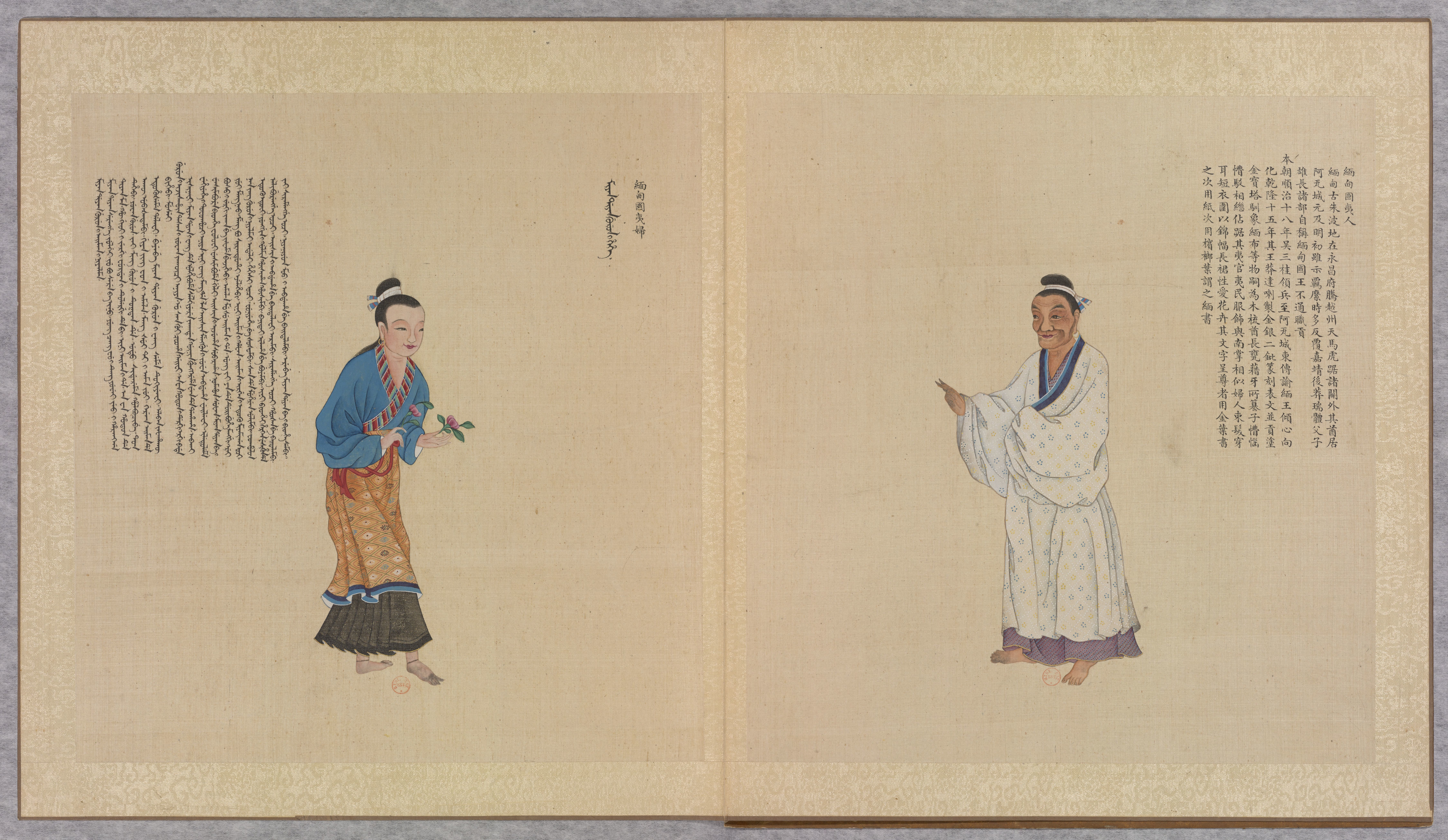
Portrait of Burmese nobility painted by Qing dynasty in 1751

King Nanda (r. 1581–99) never gained the full support of his father's chosen vassal rulers. Within the first three years of his reign, both Ava and Ayutthaya revolted. Though he managed to defeat the Ava rebellion in 1584, the king never did establish firm control over Upper Burma and the surrounding Shan states. He could not get the most populous region in Burma to contribute much to his war effort in Siam. (His best troop levels were never more than a third of his father's.) He should have focused on reestablishing his authority in Upper Burma, and let Siam go—but he could not see it. He feared that acknowledging Ayutthaya's independence would invite yet more Tai rebellions, some perhaps closer to home. Nanda launched five major punitive campaigns against Siam between 1584 and 1593, all of which failed disastrously. With each Siamese victory, other vassals grew more inclined to throw off allegiance and more reluctant to contribute military forces. By the late 1580s and early 1590s, Pegu had to lean ever more heavily on the already modest population of Lower Burma for the debilitating war effort. Able men all over Lower Burma fled military service to become monks, debt slaves, private retainers, or refugees in nearby kingdoms. As more cultivators fled, rice prices in Lower Burma reached unheard of levels.

The empire's precipitous collapse ensued. Siam seized the entire Tenasserim coast in 1595, and the rest of the vassals had broken away—de jure or de facto—by 1597. The breakaway state of Toungoo and the western kingdom of Arakan jointly invaded Lower Burma in 1598, and captured Pegu in 1599. The allies thoroughly looted, and burned down the imperial capital, “one of the wonders of Asia”, in 1600. The First Toungoo Dynasty, “the most adventurous and militarily successful in the country's history”, ceased to exist; it was also the "shortest-lived" major dynasty. The First Toungoo Empire was "a victim of its own success." Its "stunning military conquests were not matched by stable administrative controls in the Tai world or outlying areas of the Irrawaddy basin," and the "overheated" empire "disintegrated no less rapidly than it had been constructed".

=== Aftermath ===
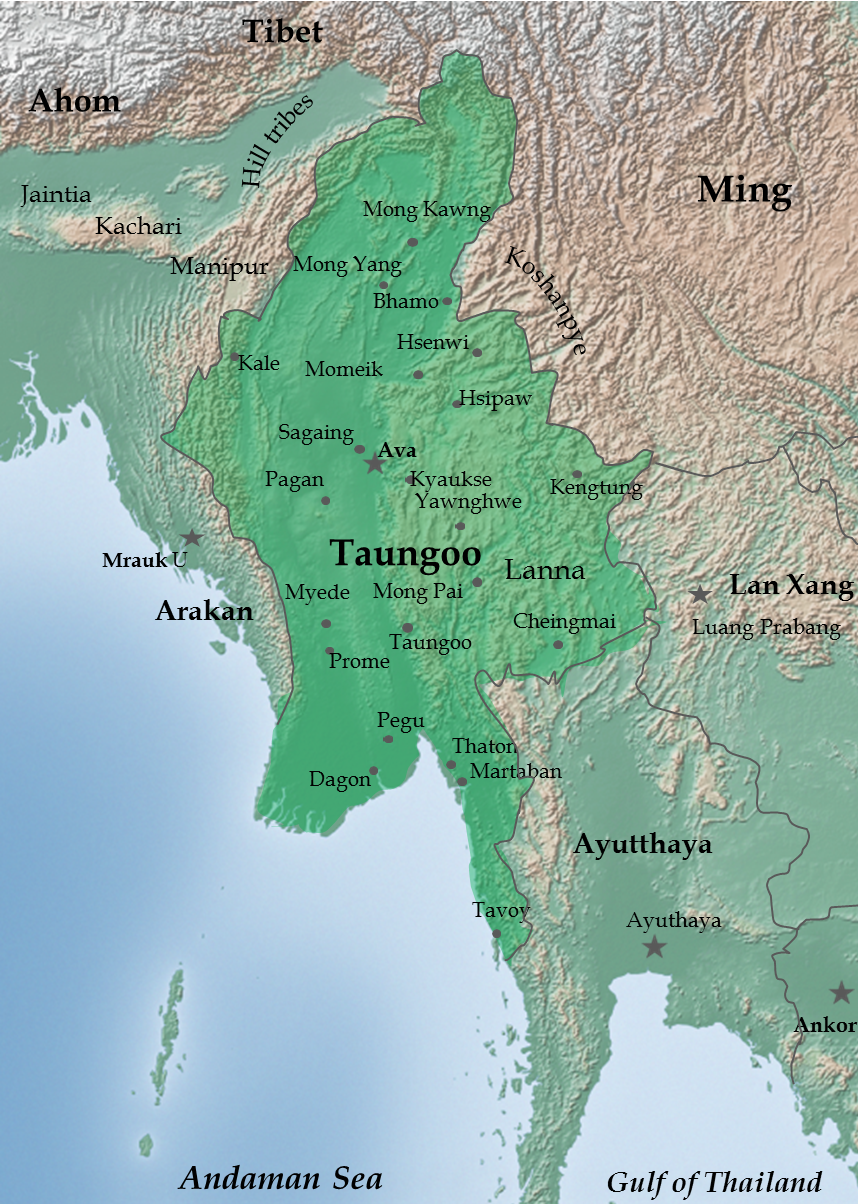
The restored Taungoo dynasty, or Nyaungyan dynasty, c. 1650

Even before the fall of Pegu, the breakaway states of the empire had been engaged in a series of “confused, many-sided wars” since the mid-1590s.

Prome attacked Toungoo in 1595. Prome and Ava fought for central Burma in 1596–97. Prome and Toungoo later agreed to attack Ava in 1597 but Toungoo broke off the alliance and attacked Prome in 1597. In the central mainland, Lan Xang and Lan Na went to war in 1595–96 and again in 1598–1603. Siam supported a Chiang Rai rebellion against Lan Na (Chiang Mai) in 1599. By 1601, Lan Na was divided into three spheres: Chiang Mai, Siam-backed Chiang Rai, Lan Xang-backed Nan. Chiang Mai defeated the Siam-backed rebellion in Chiang Rai in 1602 only to submit to Ayutthaya later that year. Chiang Mai retook Nan from Lan Xang in 1603. In the western mainland, Siam invaded Lower Burma in 1600, and went on to attack Toungoo only to be driven back by Toungoo's ally Arakan. The Portuguese garrison at Syriam switched allegiance from Arakan to Goa in 1603. Siamese vassal Martaban then entered into an alliance with Portuguese Syriam. Ava had seized cis-Salween Shan states by 1604. Siam planned to invade Ava's vassal southern Shan states in 1605 before cancelling it because of the sudden death of its warrior king Naresuan (r. 1590–1605). Ava conquered Prome (1608), Toungoo (1610), Portuguese Syriam (1613), Siamese Martaban and Tavoy (1613), and Lan Na (1614).

Still, in contrast to 250 years of political fragmentation that followed Pagan's collapse, this interregnum proved brief. As ephemeral as the overextended Toungoo Empire was, the underlying forces that underpinned its rise were not. By 1622, a branch of the fallen house (known retrospectively as the Restored Toungoo Dynasty or Nyaungyan Dynasty) had succeeded in reconstituting a major portion of the First Toungoo Empire, except for Siam, Lan Xang and Manipur. The new dynasty did not overextend itself by trying to take over Siam or Lan Xang. This was a more “realistic and organic” polity that would last until the mid-18th century. The new dynasty proceeded to create a political and legal system whose basic features would continue under the Konbaung dynasty (1752–1885) well into the 19th century.

== Government ==
The Toungoo Empire was “in theory and fact, a poly-ethnic political formation.” The Toungoo kings largely employed then prevailing Southeast Asian administrative model of solar polities in which the high king ruled the core while semi-independent tributaries, autonomous viceroys, and governors actually controlled day-to-day administration and manpower. The system did not work well even for mid-size kingdoms like Ava and Siam. Now, because of the sheer size of the empire, the system was even more decentralised and stretched thinner still. At any rate, it was the only system the Toungoo kings knew, and they "had no choice but to retain it." The kings attempted administrative reforms only at the margins, which proved insufficient to hold the empire after Bayinnaung. Indeed, "Bayinnaung's goal of controlling virtually the entire mainland from Pegu proved utterly mad."

=== Administrative Divisions ===
==== Core Region ====
The dynasty's original home was the Toungoo region, with the capital at Toungoo. But from 1539 onward, the High King, styled as “King of Kings”, moved the capital to Pegu (Bago), and governed only what used to be the Hanthawaddy Kingdom. This was the first time in Burmese history that a capital, which had the authority over the entire Irrawaddy basin, was located near the coast. The Toungoo kings retained the traditional three-province structure of the old Hanthawaddy Kingdom; Bayinnaung later annexed the Siamese Province of Mergui into the core administration for its maritime revenues. (Note: The province was annexed at least by 1568 per (Maha Yazawin Vol. 2 2006: 295) when the governor of Tenasserim built a gate at the new Pegu city. Since the construction of the city began in 1565, the annexation may have taken place in 1565.)

Province	Present-day regions	Key cities
Bassein	Ayeyarwady Region	Bassein (Pathein), Myaungmya
Pegu	Yangon Region, southern Bago Region	Pegu, Syriam (Thanlyin)
Martaban	Mon State, northern Tanintharyi Region, southern Kayin State	Martaban, Ye
Mergui	Southern Tanintharyi Region, Phuket Province	Mergui (Myeik), Junkceylon

The provinces and their constituent divisions were ruled by vassal rulers, (Note: One exception was that the Martaban Province had a viceroy, Minye Sithu between 1552 and 1556 and another, Thiri Thudhamma Yaza, between 1581 and 1584.) who lived off apanage grants and local taxes. The core region's bureaucracy was a continuation of the old Hanthawaddy court. Most local governors as well as most officials and ministers at the Pegu court—e.g., Saw Lagun Ein, Smim Payu, Binnya Dala, Binnya Law, Daw Binnya, Binnya Kyan Htaw—were most probably ethnic Mons. (Note: These were ethnic Mon titles, and the majority of them were likely ethnic Mons. But not all officials with Mon titles were ethnic Mons. For example, per (Maha Yazawin Vol. 2 2006: 280), the leader of the 1565 rebellion at Pegu, was styled as Binnya Kyan Htaw but was an ethnic Shan. Similarly, about two hundred years later, kings Smim Htaw Buddhaketi and Binnya Dala of the Restored Hanthawaddy, despite their Mon titles, were ethnic Burman and Shan, respectively.) The word used by European visitors to describe a court official was semini, Italian translation of smim, Mon for lord.

==== Kingdoms ====
Surrounding the core region were the tributary kingdoms. The vassal rulers were still styled as kings, and were allowed to retain full royal regalia. They were required to send tributes to the crown but they generally had a freehand in the rest of the administration. Pegu generally did not get involved in local administration; its remit was national. The court launched standardisation drives to unify laws, weights and measurements, calendars, and Buddhist reforms throughout the empire. The court also drew the borders between the vassal states. (Note: Pegu kept Prome and Toungoo, traditional vassal states of Ava, as separate kingdoms. It also annexed Tennaserim from Siam to Hanthawaddy. The court also placed much contested regions between Lan Na and Lan Xang under the Chiang Mai administration.) But the centuries-old disputes never went away. They resurfaced as soon as Pegu's authority waned, and resulted in the confused, multi-party wars of 1590s and 1600s.

State	Present-day regions	Key provinces	King (reign as vassal)
Ava	Northern Myanmar (Sagaing and Mandalay Regions)	Thunaparana (Sagaing, Tagaung); Tammadipa (Ava, Pagan, Pinya, Myinsaing, Nyaungyan, Pakhan)	Thado Minsaw (1555–84); Minye Kyawswa II (1587–93)
Prome	Western central Myanmar (Magway Region, northwestern Bago Region)	Prome, Salin, Tharrawaddy	Thado Dhamma Yaza I (1542–50); Thado Dhamma Yaza II (1551–88); Thado Dhamma Yaza III (1589–95)
Toungoo	Eastern central Myanmar (northeastern Bago Region, northern Kayin State)	Toungoo	Minye Thihathu I (1540–49); Minkhaung II (1549–50; 1551–84); Minye Thihathu II (1584–97)
Lan Na	Northern Thailand	Chiang Mai, Chiang Rai, Chiang Saen, Nan — 57 provinces in total	Mekuti (1558–63); Visuddha Devi (1565–79); Nawrahta Minsaw (1579–97)
Siam	Central and Southern Thailand	Ayutthaya, Phitsanulok	Mahinthrathirat (1564–68); Mahathammarachathirat (1569–84)
Lan Xang	Laos, Northeastern Thailand	Vientiane, Luang Prabang, Champasak	Maing Pat Sawbwa (1565–68; 1570–72); Maha Ouparat (1574–88); Sen Soulintha (1589–91); Nokeo Koumane (1591–95); Vorapita (1596–99)

The Pegu court did not possess a centrally run bureaucracy, as Restored Toungoo and Konbaung dynasties would attempt, to administer the vassal states. Unlike in later periods, Pegu even at the height of the empire maintained no permanent military garrisons, or representatives in the vassal states to keep an eye on the local ruler in the peacetime. (Note: Pegu maintained garrisons only for short durations: e.g., at Chiang Mai (1558–59, 1564–65), at Ayutthaya (1569–70), at Ava (1593–97). Vientiane was a costly exception. Pegu kept a garrison there throughout the 1560s and 1570s when the garrison was not overrun (1568, and 1571/72), or kept out (1568–69; 1572–74).) As a result, the High King heavily depended on the vassal king to be both loyal and able. Ineffective vassal rulers, who did not command respect from their local sub-vassal rulers, such as those in Lan Xang and in Upper Burma after 1584, only brought constant trouble for the crown. On the other hand, able kings such as Maha Thammarachathirat (r. 1569–90) of Siam and Thado Minsaw of Ava (r. 1555–84) kept their kingdoms peaceful for the High King they were loyal to: Bayinnaung. The downside was that the able rulers were also the most likely to revolt when the High King was not Bayinnaung; and they did.

==== Princely states ====
A rank below the vassal kingdoms were the princely states, ruled by sawbwas (chiefs, princes). Except for Manipur, they were all Shan states that ringed the upper Irrawaddy valley (i.e. the Kingdom of Ava) from the Kalay State in the northwest to the Mong Pai State in the southeast. Manipur was not a Shan state, and its ruler styled himself raja (king). Nevertheless, Pegu classified the raja a "sawbwa", and treated Manipur as another princely state, albeit a major one. Two other major states were Kengtung and Mogaung, whose rulers retained the full royal regalia.

For administrative purposes, the court grouped the states into provinces (taing (တိုင်း)). During Bayinnaung's reign, Ava served as the intermediary between Pegu and the hill states. But in Nanda's reign, the court became concerned by the overly close relationship between Thado Minsaw and the sawbwas. From 1584 onwards except for 1587–93, Nanda pursued a policy of devolution in the upcountry in which Ava's role was essentially eliminated. The direct rule did not work as evidenced by the near total absence of contribution from the Shan states and Manipur towards Pegu's war effort in Siam.

Province	Present-day region(s)	Key states
Manipur	Manipur	Manipur
Mawriya	Northwestern Sagaing Region, Chin State	Kalay, Thaungdut, Myet-Hna-Me (Chin Hills)
Mohnyin–Mogaung	Kachin State	Mohnyin, Mogaung, Khamti (Putao), Bhamo
Thiri Rahta	northern Shan State	Hsenwi
Gantala Rahta	northwestern Shan State	Mong Mit
Kawsampi (Ko Shan Pyay)	Southwestern Yunnan (Dehong, Baoshan, Lincang)	Kaingma, Maing Maw, Mowun, Latha, Hotha, Sanda, Mona, Maing Lyin, Sigwin
Maha Nagara	Southern Yunnan (Xishuangbanna)	Keng Hung
Khemawara	Eastern Shan State	Keng Tung
Kanbawza	Western Shan State, Kayah State	Hsipaw (Onbaung), Nyaungshwe, Mong Nai, Mong Pai

Bayinnaung considered control of the Shan states of utmost strategic importance for his hold of the upcountry. Raids by nearby highland Shan states had been an overhanging concern for successive lowland regimes since the 14th century. The most feared were Mohnyin and Mogaung, the twin Shan states, which led most of the raids. Bayinnaung introduced a key administrative reform, which turned out to be his most important and most enduring of his legacies. The king permitted the sawbwas to retain their feudal rights over their subjects. The office of the sawbwa remained hereditary. But the incumbent sawbwa could now be removed by the king for gross misconduct although the king's choice of successor was limited to members of the sawbwa's own family. The key innovation was that he required sons of his vassal rulers to reside in the palace as pages, who served a dual purpose: they were hostages for good conduct of their fathers and they received valuable training in Burmese court life. His Shan policy was followed by all Burmese kings right up to the final fall of the kingdom to the British in 1885.

==== Spheres of influence ====
According to contemporary sources, Pegu also claimed lands far beyond the princely states as tributaries or protectorates. Scholarship does not accept the claims of control; the states were at least what Pegu considered within its sphere of influence. The claims include:

State(s)	Present-day regions	Notes
Tammaleitta Taing	Cachar and Northeastern India	The Province of Tammaleitta reportedly stretched as far west as the Ganges. Chronicles say rulers of Cachar, Calcutta, and Golkonda paid tribute. The expansive claims may have been Bayinnaung's attempt to check the advancing Mughal Empire. (Note: (Phayre 1967: 118–119): Bayinnaung sent an embassy to Emperor Akbar in 1579 after Mughals' annexation of Bengal in 1575–76. The 1580–81 Toungoo invasion of Arakan may have been in response to the Moghul takeover of Bengal.) Later Restored Toungoo kings claimed only to Manipur, which they never controlled in any case.
Sein Taing	Southern Yunnan	The Province of Sein ("Chinese Province") reportedly included lands beyond Kawsampi (Ko Shan Pyay). The exact border was not mentioned during Bayinnaung's and Nanda's reigns (although the Mekong presumably could have served as the natural border). (Note: See the maps in (Harvey 1925: 151) and (Sein Lwin Lay 2006: 44) both of which mark the border with Ming China on the Mekong at Kenghung. Sein Lwin Lay's border goes farther up along the Mekong's than Harvey's.) After 1594, China established eight frontier “Iron Gates” inside Yunnan, which Restored Toungoo kings came to regard as the de facto border. (Note: (Than Tun Vol. 1 1983: 18–19, 181–182): The royal order dated 14 November 1598 (1st waning of Tazaungmon 960 ME) by King Nyaungyan says that the extent of Nyaungyan's domain included the Iron Bridge in the east, Siam in the south, the sea coast in the west, and Manipur and northern Shan states (Kachin State) in the north.) To be sure, Ming China did not view the gates as the extent of its realm, and continued to claim lands beyond the gates. Chinese records show that eight out of nine states of Ko Shan Pyay paid tribute to China down to the 19th century. (Note: (Yule 1857: 88–89): The "Nine Shan States" (Ko Shan Pyay) paid tribute to both China and Burma down to the 19th century. Only Kaingma (north of Theinni, in China today) was absent from the Chinese list.)
Dai Viet and Cambodia	Vietnam, Cambodia	Chronicles claim states as far east as Dai Viet paid tribute. According to Harvey, Dai Viet and Cambodia may have paid “propitiatory homage”. According to Thaw Kaung, the armies received tribute from border vassal states of Lan Xang, which are now part of Vietnam. At any rate, the tribute, even if true, most certainly did not translate into any lasting control. Indeed, Pegu's authority dissipated as soon as the armies departed. The lack of firm authority over Lan Xang was the reason why the fruitless campaigns had to be undertaken year-after-year in the first place.
Ceylon	Sri Lanka	Chronicles say Bayinnaung considered Kotte a protectorate and got involved in the affairs of the island only because the king wished to protect Theravada Buddhism on the island from the Portuguese. (Note: (Harvey 1925: 172–173) Bayinnaung had been greatly concerned about the Portuguese effect on the health of Theravada Buddhism since the Portuguese Archbishop of Goa grounded the Buddha Tooth Relic of Ceylon to powder in 1561.) He competed with Portuguese Goa for influence on the island with other Ceylonese kingdoms. After 1576, Goa considered it was technically at war with Burma for her interference in Ceylon.

The expansive spheres of influence shrank greatly after Bayinnaung's death. Nanda, according to a 1593 inscription, continued to claim his father's realm even after his latest defeat in Siam. In reality, he never had full control of the upcountry, let alone the peripheral states.

=== Legal and commercial standardisations ===
In Bayinnaung's reign, the king introduced a measure of legal uniformity by summoning learned monks and officials from all over dominions to prescribe an official collection of law books. The scholars compiled Dhammathat Kyaw and Kosaungchok, based on King Wareru's dhammathat. The decisions given in his court were collected in Hanthawaddy Hsinbyumyashin Hpyat-hton. According to Huxley, the 16th-century Burmese legalism was "quite different from those of its neighbors in East and South Asia", and some aspects "are reminiscent of Western European approaches to law and kingship." Bayinnaung promoted the new law throughout the empire so far as it was compatible with customs and practices of local society. The adoption of Burmese customary law and the Burmese calendar in Siam began in his reign. He also standardised the weights and measurements such as the cubit, tical, basket throughout the realm.

=== Military ===
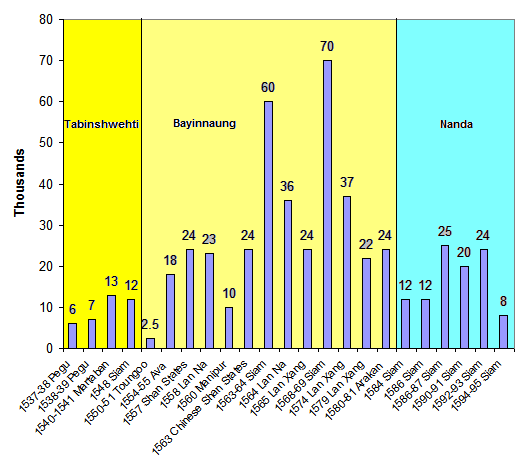
Royal Burmese Army mobilisation (1530–99)

The First Toungoo Dynasty was "the most adventurous and militarily successful in the country’s history." It founded the largest empire in Southeast Asia on the back of “breathtaking” military conquests. The success has been attributed to a "more martial culture" of Toungoo, incorporation of Portuguese firearms and foreign mercenaries, and larger forces. But even at its peak, the vaunted Toungoo military had trouble dealing with guerrilla warfare, and faced severe logistic issues in suppressing rebellions in remote hill states.

==== Organisation ====
The Toungoo military organisation drew on its Upper Burma precedent. The military was organised into a small standing army of a few thousand, which defended the capital and the palace, and a much larger conscript-based wartime army. The wartime army consisted of infantry, cavalry, elephantry, artillery and naval units. The navy was mainly river-borne, and used mostly for transportation of troops and cargo. Conscription was based on the ahmudan (အမှုထမ်း, "crown service") system, which required local chiefs to supply their predetermined quota of men from their jurisdiction on the basis of population in times of war. The ahmudan were a class of people, who were exempt from most personal taxes in exchange for regular or military service of the crown. The quotas were fixed until the 17th century, when Restored Toungoo kings instituted variable quotas to take advantage of demographic fluctuations.

The earliest extant record of organisation of the Royal Burmese Army dates only from 1605 but the organizational structure of the earlier First Toungoo era is likely to be similar, if not essentially the same. A 1605 royal order decreed that each regiment shall consist of 1000 foot soldiers under 100 company leaders called akyat (အကြပ်), 10 battalion commanders called ahsaw (အဆော်) and 1 commander called ake (အကဲ), and all must be equipped with weapons including guns and cannon. A typical 17th-century regiment was armed with 10 cannon, 100 guns and 300 bows.

The ability to raise more conscripts depended greatly on the High King's grip over his vassals. Bayinnaung required newly conquered states to provide their quota of manpower for the next campaign. According to scholarship, at the peak of the empire, the imperial army could perhaps raise about 100,000 troops, and the largest initial troop level for a single campaign was about 70,000. (Note: Chronicles claim over 500,000 troops for a single campaign. But (Harvey 1925: 333–336) rejects the claim, saying that Bayinnaung at most could have raised 300,000 men, based on the size of the population but such "so high a figure is improbable: he had no transport, and could not have fed them." (Lieberman 1984: 98) concurs: "Military mobilizations were probably more of a boast than a realistic estimate. Modern industrial states have difficulty placing 10% of their people under arms.") A major weakness of the system was that the vast majority of the potential levy hailed from outside the capital region. In 1581, only 21% of residents within a 200-km radius of Pegu were ahmudans (whereas in 1650 in the Restored Toungoo period, over 40% of the ahmudans were within 200 km of the capital Ava). It meant that the High King of the First Toungoo period needed to rely far more on his vassal rulers to raise the troops. The weakness was brutally exposed when the High King was not Bayinnaung. Nanda's troops most probably never totalled more than 25,000.

==== Firearms ====
One crucial factor in Toungoo's success was the army's early adoption of Portuguese firearms (arquebus matchlocks and cast-metal muzzleloader cannon), and formation of musket and artillery units. Portuguese weaponry proved superior in accuracy, safety, ballistic weight, and rapidity of fire than Asian-made counterparts. The first special musket and artillery units, made up mostly of Portuguese and Indian Ocean (mostly Muslim) mercenaries, were formed in the late 1530s. The Burmese later learned to integrate matchlocks into both infantry and elephanteer units. In some late 16th-century campaigns, as high as 20–33 percent of the troops were equipped with muskets. But artillery units continued to be manned by foreign mercenaries throughout the 16th century. Toungoo artillery corps never acquired massive siege guns of Europe but they "used Portuguese cannon to good effect by mounting them on high mounds or towers, and then shooting down into besieged towns". Portuguese firearms proved particularly effective against interior states like the Shan states. However, the advantage of firearms was neutralised against Siam, a prosperous coastal power with its own well-equipped military.

==== Martial culture ====
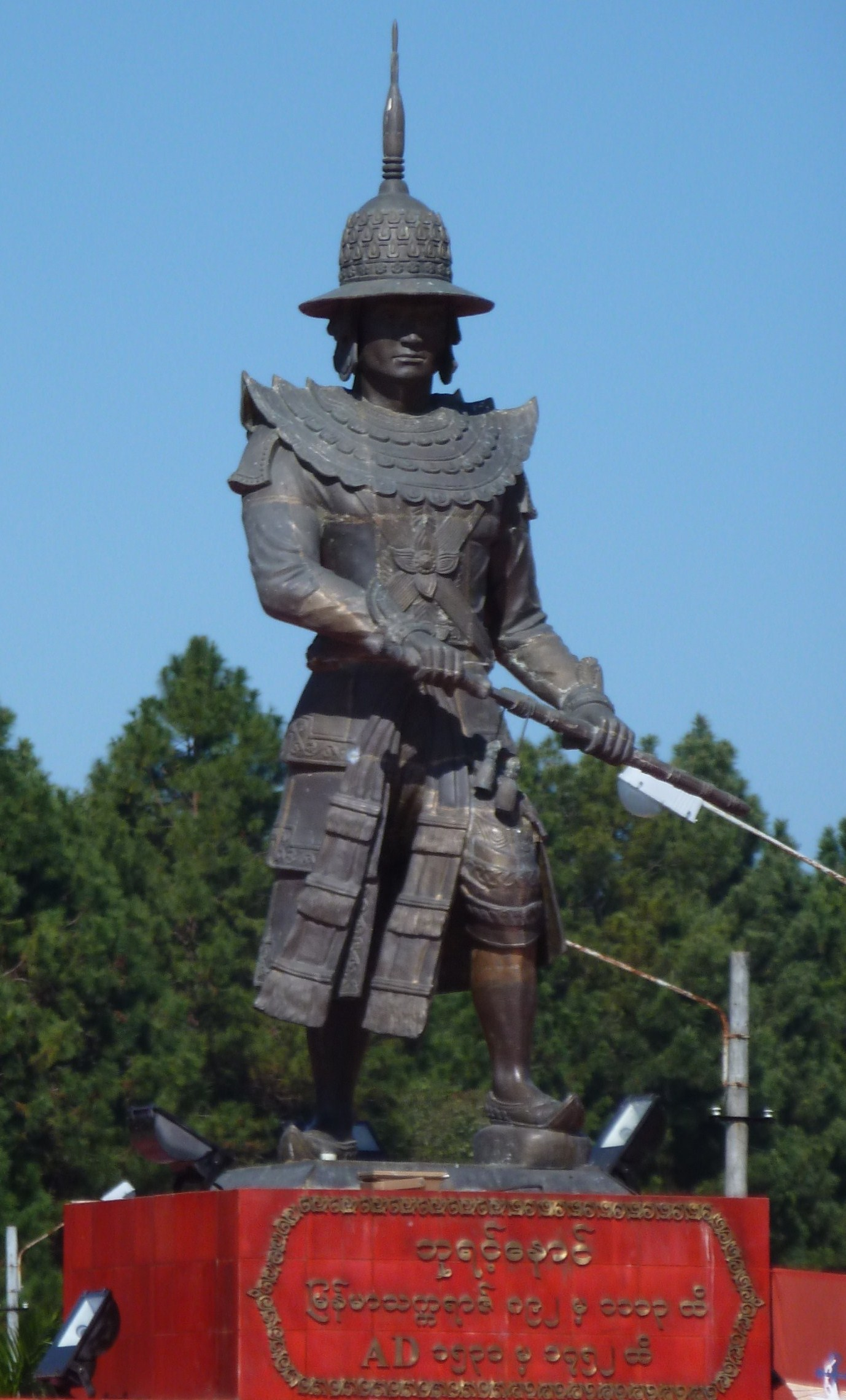
Statue of Bayinnaung in front of the DSA

Another key factor was Toungoo's "more martial culture" and "more aggressive leadership". Toungoo was a product of Upper Burma's ceaseless wars of the prior centuries. In the age of rampant gubernatorial revolts, any rulers hoping to rule a kingdom needed to take command of the army. All senior princes of the House of Toungoo received a military style education since childhood, and were expected to take the field in person. Several Toungoo leaders of the era, including Tabinshwehti, Bayinnaung, Nanda, Thado Minsaw, Minye Thihathu, Thado Dhamma Yaza III and Natshinnaung, first took the field in their teenage years. This kind of martial tradition simply did not exist in "far larger, more secure" kingdoms like Siam. (Indeed, the same kind of complacency afflicted later Restored Toungoo kings, who from 1650 onwards stopped taking the field as the country became largely stable.) Their more martial culture and battlefield successes gave the Toungoo command an increasingly greater field experience, which their rival commands in the region simply could not match. According to Lieberman, this was a key factor that enabled a western mainland polity "to conquer the central mainland rather than vice versa".

==== Limits of military power ====
Even at the peak of its might, the Toungoo military had the most difficult time controlling remote hill states. They never solved the sheer logistical issues of transporting and feeding large numbers of troops for sustained periods of time. Bayinnaung's persistence in sending troops year after year cost an untold number of lives, which at one point caused his senior advisers to murmur loudly. The conqueror king was fortunate that a charismatic guerrilla leader like King Setthathirath of Lan Xang (r. 1548–72) was assassinated by a local rival. After Bayinnaung, Lower Burma lost the manpower advantage over a far more populous Siam. Ayutthaya's larger, well-equipped armies not only repulsed Nanda's undermanned invasions but also ended up seizing the Tenasserim coast in the process.

==== Legacy ====
The First Toungoo dynasty's military organisation and strategy were adapted by its two main successor states: Restored Toungoo and Siam. Restored Toungoo kings used the First Toungoo's formula of greater military experience, modern firearms and (comparatively greater) manpower to partially restore the empire in the following two decades. Likewise, Siam's military service system, phrai luang, was reorganised, modelled after the ahmudan system in the 1570s—indeed to fulfill Bayinnaung's demands for conscripts. Likewise, the First Toungoo dynasty's military strategy and tactics were likely adopted by Siam's new generation of leadership, Naresuan and Ekathotsarot, who grew up in Pegu, and were most probably exposed to Toungoo military strategy. By 1600, Siam had not only regained the Tenasserim coast from Burma but also expanded deeper into Cambodia. After 1614, an equilibrium of sorts prevailed between the two successor states. Neither state extended in any direction to a point her supply lines were more extended than those of her nearest rival.

== Culture and society ==
=== Demography ===
==== Size of population ====
Estimates (Note: (Lieberman 1984: 18): No large-scale censuses of any kind were conducted. Extant censuses from the period cover just four corridors of settlement in Lower Burma: Bassein-Myaungmya in the western delta; Martaban-Moulmein littoral; Myan Aung to Danubyu in the eastern delta; Pegu-Syriam-Dagon—capital region. (Lieberman 1984: 21–22): In 1581, a regional census of the 16 leading townships of Lower Burma showed a combined population of less than 28,000 households (~200,000 people). (Lieberman 1984: 20): The first-ever Irrawaddy valley-wide census was conducted only in 1638, and the results did not survive.) of the population of the empire point to over 6 million. In 1600, the most populous region of the erstwhile empire was Siam (2.5 million), followed by Upper Burma (1.5 million), the Shan high lands (1 million) and Lower Burma (0.5 million)—for a total of at least 5.5 million. Estimates for Lan Na, Lan Xang and Manipur are not known. The size of the population of the empire before the devastating wars of 1584–99 was probably over 6 million. The population of the Pegu capital region, according to a 1581 census, was only about 200,000.

The low population spread across a comparatively large region meant that the rulers prized manpower more than land. Winners of wars never failed to deport the local population to their capital region where they can be controlled closer. The deportations also deprived the defeated regions of valuable manpower with which to revolt.

==== Ethnic groups ====
The First Toungoo Empire was a multi-ethnic society although the concept of ethnicity was still highly fluid, heavily influenced by language, culture, class, locale, and political power. Still, by the 16th century, broad “politicized” ethnic patterns had emerged. In the western mainland, four main politico-ethnic groups had emerged—Mons in the region south of 18:30N, known in contemporary writings as Talaing-Pyay or Ramanya-Detha (“land of the Mons”); Burmans in the region north of 18.30N called Myanma-Pyay (“land of the Burmans”); Shans in the hill regions called Shan Pyay (“land of the Shans”); and Rakhines in the western coastal region called Rakhine Pyay (“land of the Rakhines”). Similarly, in the central mainland, nascent politico-ethnic identities of Tai Yuans in Lan Na; Laotians in Lan Xang, and the Siamese in Siam had emerged.

Alongside the main politico-ethnicities were several smaller ethnic minority groups. In predominantly Mon-speaking Lower Burma, a sizeable number of Burmans, Karens, and Shans (as well as a host of Europeans, Jews, Armenians, Persians, etc. at key ports) came to settle in this period. Several deportees from the conquered states as far away as Lan Xang were settled in Lower Burma. In Upper Burma, Shans, Kadus, Karens, Chins and other minorities still occupied dry zone fringes. The Shan states had Chins, Kachins, Was, Palaungs, Karennis, etc. Over in the central mainland, several linguistically distinct Tai groups coexisted alongside sizeable numbers of Mons, Khmers, and a host of hill minorities. The entrepôt of Ayutthaya hosted significant communities of Bengalis, Arabs and Persians.

To be sure, the ethnic definitions were loose categorisations. Overarching politico-ethnic identities were still in their early stages of development. In the western mainland, even the so-called major ethnic groups—such as Burmans, Mons, Shans—were themselves divided into rival centres, with distinctive local traditions and in many cases different dialects. The same was true for smaller minorities still—indeed, terms like Kachins, Karens, and Chins are exonyms given by Burmans that summarily group several different groups. In the central mainland, the main Siamese, Lao and Yuan ethnicities were still in an embryonic stage, and a chiefly elite concept. In Siam, the Siamese language and ethnicity were the “preserve” of the aristocracy called the munnai, and most commoners in Ayutthaya, according to an early 16th-century Portuguese observer, still spoke Mon dialects rather than still emerging Siamese, and cut their hair like the Mons of Pegu.

==== Effects of fluid ethnic identities ====
Weak or embryonic ethnic identities had broad geopolitical implications. One key result was that patron-client structures often preempted ethnic identity, giving rise to frequent political alliances across ethnic lines. The same phenomenon was also prevalent in states as diverse as Vietnam, Russia and France during this period. Not surprisingly, all armies and courts of the era consisted of significant minority ethnicities. Frequent cross-ethnic defections "bore no particular stigma." States large and small readily shifted alliances with little regard to ethnic loyalties.

This is not to say that neither wars nor population movements had little effect. In the Irrawaddy valley, for example, north-to-south migrations "pitted newcomers against established populations and encouraged stereotyping both as an emotional response to an alien presence and as a (perhaps unconscious) strategy of group mobilization. Shan raids on Upper Burma, which bred bitter anti-Shan diatribes, offer the most dramatic example." But the weak link between ethnicity and political loyalty meant patron-client relationships remained the single most important factor in state building. One figure who successfully exploited this at the grandest scale was Bayinnaung. The emperor formed patron-client relationships based on universal Buddhist cultural concepts—alongside the threat of massive military reprisals—to hold the empire. He presented himself as cakkavatti, or World Ruler, par excellence, and formed personal relationships based on the concepts of thissa (allegiance) and kyezu (obligation). The tradition of cross-ethnic patron-client relationships continued to thrive, albeit at smaller scales, in mainland Southeast Asia down to the 19th century.

==== Social classes ====
The First Toungoo society in the Irrawaddy valley followed Pagan and Ava precedents. At the top of the pyramid were the immediate royal family, followed by the upper officialdom made up of extended royal family members. Royalty and officials— known collectively as “rulers” or min—were "divided into numerous sub-grades, each with its own sumptuary insignia". The majority of the people belonged to one of four broad group of commoners (hsin-ye-tha, lit. “people of poverty”).

Commoner social class	Description
ahmudan	Royal servicemen who received land grants from the crown, and were exempt from most personal taxes in exchange for regular military service. They were called kyundaw in the Pagan period. Their authority crosscut the territorial jurisdictions of local governors and headmen. They provided the crown with labour on a fixed or rotational basis. Besides military service, ahmudans also supplied the palace with a “variety of specialized services ranging from bird-shooing to perfume-making to the painting of magical signs.” In the late 16th century, the ahmudan system broke down as people fled to avoid military service. Early Restored Toungoo kings had to rebuild the ahmudan system from ground up by deporting large number of prisoners to lowland areas, close to the capital.
athi	The commoners who did not live on royal land. They paid substantial taxes but owed no regular military service.
kyun	Bondsmen who owed labour to individual patron, and outside of royal obligation. The debt was not hereditary. They paid no taxes.
paya kyun	Private bondsmen who owed labour only to monasteries and temples but not to the crown. They paid no taxes, and could not be conscripted into military service.

A similar system was in place in Siam.

Social class	Description
munnai	Tax-exempt administrative elite in the capital and administrative centres.
phrai luang	Royal servicemen who worked a specified period each year (possibly six months) for the crown. They were normally prevented from leaving their village except to perform corvees or military services. Similar to the ahmudan in Burma.
phrai som	Commoners with no obligation to the crown. They vastly outnumbered the phrai luang. Similar to Burmese kyun (private retainers).

In both sectors of the empire, the society was deeply stratified: the division between the elite and the commoners was stark. In the Irrawaddy valley, min males on balance were more likely to study for long periods in monasteries, to be knowledgeable in Pali, even Sanskrit; to wear Indian and Chinese textiles, to be familiar with foreign conventions than their hsin-ye-tha counterparts. In the Chao Phraya valley, the munnai like the aristocrats in Lan Xang and Lan Na "were a kind of a caste." Marriage between capital and provincial munnai was possible but between social classes was "out of the question." What subsequently became known as Siamese language, culture and ethnicity were their more or less exclusive preserve.

=== Literacy and literature ===
Literacy throughout the empire remained essentially the preserve of the aristocrats and the monks. In the Irrawaddy valley, the system of near-universal village monasteries and male education characteristic of later centuries was not fully yet developed. Unlike in later periods, monks continued to staff the modest royal secretariats of the regional courts, and most of the Burmese (and certainly Pali) literature of the era were produced by the aristocrats and the clergy. Because scribal talent remained rare, the cost of Tipitika transcriptions as late as 1509 may not have been much lower than in the 13th century.

Burmese orthography continued to follow the antique square format developed for aristocratic stone inscriptions, rather than the cursive format that took hold from the 17th century, when popular writings led to wider use of palm leaves and folded papers known as parabaiks. The Burmese language and script continued to affect other languages and scripts in the Irrawaddy valley. Since the 15th century, Mon inscriptions had adopted Burmese orthographic conventions and to incorporate, consciously or not, large numbers of Burmese loan words. Various Tai-Shan scripts were developed based on the Burmese script.

Low literacy rates notwithstanding, this period saw the continued growth of Burmese literature both in terms of quantity and genres—a trend that began in the Ava period (1364–1555). Chiefly through the efforts of monks and aristocrats, a new generation of chronicles, law codes, and poetry were written in vernacular Burmese, or in addition to Pali. Some of the chronicles such as Razadarit Ayedawbon and Hanthawaddy Hsinbyushin Ayedawbon have survived to this day. A new form of poetry, called yadu, first pioneered in the Ava period, flourished. Indeed, some of the most well-known yadu poets such as Shin Htwe Hla, Yaza Thara, Nawaday, Hsinbyushin Medaw, and Natshinnaung hailed from this period.

In the Chao Phraya valley, literacy in Siamese, not to mention Pali, were strictly the domain of the elite. Monastic education for the commoners (phrai) remained "quite a luxury.". In Lan Xang and Lan Na too, the literacy in Lao and Lan Na scripts was the preserve of the aristocrats. The Siamese language (central Thai), a mixture of a more northerly Tai dialect with Khmerized Tai from the Ayutthaya area, was coalescing. The Siamese script too underwent several modifications before achieving its final form by about 1600.

=== Religion ===
==== Buddhist reforms ====
Wat Phu Khao Thong just outside Ayutthaya donated by Bayinnaung

An enduring legacy of the First Toungoo Dynasty was the introduction of a more orthodox version of Theravada Buddhism (Mahavihara school of Ceylon) to Upper Burma and the Shan States. The Toungoo reforms were modelled after those instituted by King Dhammazedi of Hanthawaddy (r. 1471–92).

The state of religious practices in western and central mainland Southeast Asia before the rise of the empire was highly fragmented. In general, the lowland areas were largely—nominally—Theravada Buddhist, and highland regions were a mix of Theravada Buddhist and animist to strictly animist. Pre-Buddhist rituals remained part and parcel of accepted religious practices throughout the mainland. For example, on the Shan highlands, as late as 1557, Shan sawbwas' favourite servants and animals were customarily killed and buried with him. Even in predominantly Buddhist lowland Upper Burma, down to the 16th century, animal sacrifices were still regularly performed and distilled liquored was consumed in Buddhist-sanctioned events (often attended by Buddhist abbots and the royalty). (Note: (Lieberman 2003: 135–136): The soldiers of King Mohnyin Thado (r. 1426–39) celebrated their king’s access by sacrificing horses and cattle to the Mahagiri spirit. Still in Upper Burma, down to the 16th century, forest dweller monks presided over land-transfer rituals in which distilled liquor (ayek) was consumed, and cattle, pigs, and fowls were slaughtered. Princes and even Buddhist abbots attended these ceremonies.) Even in Lower Burma, where Theravada Buddhist practices had become more orthodox since the 1480s, "monastic practices were deficient by later standards, and spirit propitiation was a dominant local concern."

Bayinnaung brought Dhammazedi's Sinhalese-style orthodox reforms to lands throughout his domain. Viewing himself as the "model Buddhist king," the king distributed copies of the scriptures, fed monks, and built pagodas at every new conquered state from Upper Burma and Shan states to Lan Na and Siam. Some of the pagodas are still to be seen, and in later ages the Burmese would point to them as proof of their claim to rule those countries still. Following in the footsteps of Dhammazedi, he supervised mass ordinations at the Kalyani Thein at Pegu in his orthodox Theravada Buddhism in the name of purifying the religion. He prohibited all human and animal sacrifices throughout the kingdom. The ban also extended to the foreign settlers’ animal sacrifices such as the Eid al-Adha.

Many of Bayinnaung's reforms were continued by his successors of the Restored Toungoo Dynasty. The Forest dweller sect virtually disappeared. Over time, Theravada practices became more regionally uniform, the hill regions were drawn into closer contact with the basin in the 17th and 18th centuries.

==== Other practices ====
Various animist practices remained alive and well, not just hill regions but even in the lowlands. Bayinnaung's attempts to rid of animist nat worship from Buddhism failed. Adherents of Abrahamic faiths also came to settle. The foreign merchants and mercenaries brought their Islam and Roman Catholicism. In the 1550s, the Muslim merchants at Pegu erected what appears to have been their first mosque. The descendants of Muslim and Catholic mercenaries continued to fill the ranks of the army's elite artillery units.

== Economy ==
Agriculture, and maritime trade dominated the economy of the empire. Maritime trade was most prevalent in Lower Burma and southern Siam. Agriculture was dominant in Upper Burma and surrounding highlands. The Ayutthaya region also had a strong agriculture-based economy.

=== Agriculture ===
In the western mainland, the three principal irrigated regions were all located in Upper Burma: Kyaukse, Minbu and Mu valley—as had been the case since the 13th century. Lower Burma's agriculture was not well developed—less than 10% of the acreage of the mid-1930s in the British colonial period was under cultivation in the 16th century. Upper Burma had about 730,000 hectares (1.8 million acres) under cultivation c. 1600, divided even between rice and dry crops. In addition to rice, New World peanuts, tobacco and maize were grown. Cotton became the major crop in dry zone areas ill-suited for rice, as in Meiktila, Yamethin and Myingyan districts. Cotton was Burma's principal export commodity to China, and drove domestic handicraft industry.

=== Trade ===
The coastal region instead relied heavily on trade. The main ports were Pegu, Martaban, Tavoy, and Mergui. Products and goods from the interior—rice, and other food stuffs, as well as a variety of luxury goods (rubies, sapphires, musk, lac, benzoin, gold)—were exported to Malacca, Sumatra, the Coromandel Coast (Portuguese Pulicat, Masulipatam), Bengal and Gujarat. In return, Pegu imported Chinese manufactures and spices from Malacca and Sumatra, and Indian textiles from the Indian states; and indeed highly sought after state-of-the-art firearms from the Portuguese. Pegu established maritime links with the Ottoman Empire by 1545.

The crown closely supervised trade, and collected duties on any trade that touched the coasts of Lower Burma and Siam. At Pegu, overseas trade was in the hands of eight brokers appointed by the king. Their fee was two percent. The crown appointed officials at Mergui, a former Siamese dependency, to supervise lucrative trade between Siam and India. His majesty's government was actively involved in the import-export business. The crown exported luxury products (musk, gold, gems) obtained through the tribute quotas from the interior states. Bayinnaung built a fleet of oceangoing vessels in the 1570s to undertake voyages on behalf of the crown.

Overland trade was principally with China. Burma's principal export to China was cotton. Based on Sun Laichen's analysis of Chinese sources, exports to Yunnan of Burmese raw cotton by c. 1600 had reached 1000 tonnes annually. Burma also exported finished Indian (and possibly Burmese) textiles as well as spices, gems, and salt to Yunnan. These goods were moved by boat to the upper Irrawaddy, where they were transferred to north-bound trains of oxen and ponies. In the opposite direction flowed Chinese iron and copper vessels, weapons, tea, and silk as well as copper and silver from Yunnanese mines.

=== Currency ===
The Toungoo empire had no official coinage. According to European company records, non-barter trade was chiefly conducted in lumps of copper-lead alloys called ganza (ဂင်ဇာ, [gɪ̀ɴzà]) to the 1560s. But New World silver began arriving via the Spanish Philippines and India in the last centuries of the 16th century, and silver gradually overtook ganza, which an "inordinately bulky medium", and became the standard medium of exchange by the early 17th century. The greater availability of silver greatly aided commercial expansion throughout the empire.

=== Conditions ===
Maritime trade wealth sustained Pegu's military might, enabling Pegu to pay for Portuguese firearms and mercenaries. Contemporary European travellers reported immense wealth of Pegu during Bayinnaung's reign. By the 1570s, Pegu's “wealth and power were now unequaled”, and regarded by the Portuguese as “the powerfullest Monarchy in Asia, except that of China”. The prosperous life at the capital, however, was probably not replicated at the countryside. Annual mobilisations of men greatly reduced the manpower necessary to cultivate the rice fields. Even during at the peak of the empire, harvests at times fell perilously low, causing severe rice shortages such as in 1567. By the mid-1590s, constant warfare left Lower Burma severely depopulated and rice prices at unheard of levels.

== Legacy ==
The First Toungoo Empire left no monumental architecture as the Pagan Empire did. The grandeur of Pegu was forever lost, and is known only from contemporary European accounts. Unlike the Ava period, few literary innovations came out. Its main legacies were political and cultural consolidations in both western and central mainland Southeast Asia.

The empire marked the end of the period of petty kingdoms in mainland Southeast Asia. Not only did the dynasty successfully reunify the Irrawaddy valley for the first time since the late 13th century but it also absorbed the surrounding highlands into the lowland orbit for good. Toungoo came of age in a period when the arrival of European firearms and an increase in Indian Ocean commerce enabled lowland polities to project power into interior states. The advantages of the lowland states persisted even after the monumental collapse of the empire. Of the successor states, Restored Toungoo and Siam were the two winners that emerged to dominate the western and central mainland Southeast Asia, respectively, although Ayutthaya's sway in the central mainland was less complete than Restored Toungoo's near complete domination of the western mainland. (Whereas only Arakan escaped Restored Toungoo's restoration, Lan Xang and Cambodia remained independent, albeit greatly weakened, out of Siam's grasp till the 19th century. On the other hand, Lan Na's loss of independence was permanent: after 1558, she remained a Burmese province for the better part of two centuries whereupon Lan Na entered the Siamese empire.) Still, the accelerated thrusts towards regional hegemony were comparable in both sectors.

Another key legacy was the 17th-century administrative reforms that addressed the empire's numerous shortcomings. In both Restored Toungoo Burma and Siam, monarchs worked to reduce the power of viceroys and governors. Similarities between Burmese and Siamese reforms “reflected, in part, independent responses to similar challenges” but they also suggest “a degree of squint-eyed mutual borrowing.” In both sectors, the crown reduced or stopped the appointment of senior princes to provincial towns, and obliged them to reside at the capital in special palaces where they could more easily be monitored. The actual administrators of the provinces went to commoner officials with no claims to the throne.

As a result of political and economic integration, the cultural norms in the Irrawaddy valley continued to synthesize in the 17th century. More orthodox practices of Theravada Buddhism of Hanthawaddy and Ceylon spread to the upcountry and the Shan states. The Burmese language and customs pushed outward of Upper Burma in all directions in the following centuries.

The memories of the First Toungoo Empire still loom large not just in Myanmar but also in Thailand and Laos. In Myanmar, Tabinshwehti's and Bayinnaung's exploits are widely recounted in schoolbooks. According to Myint-U, Bayinnaung is the favourite king of the present-day Burmese generals, who often see themselves "as fighting the same enemies and in the same places... their soldiers slugging their way through the same thick jungle, preparing to torch a town or press-gang villagers. The past closer, more comparable, a way to justify present action. His statues are there because the ordeal of welding a nation together by force is not just history." On the opposite side of the same token, warrior kings Naresuan of Ayutthaya and Setthathirath of Lan Xang remain the most celebrated kings in Thailand and Laos respectively—Naresuan for returning Siam to independence and Setthathirath for his pesky resistance to the empire.

== See also ==
- Toungoo dynasty
- Nyaungyan period
- Burmese–Siamese wars
- Military history of Myanmar

== Bibliography ==
- Aung-Thwin, Michael A.; Maitrii Aung-Thwin (2012). A History of Myanmar Since Ancient Times (illustrated ed.). Honolulu: University of Hawai'i Press. ISBN 978-1-86189-901-9.
- Aung Tun, Sai (2009). History of the Shan State: From Its Origins to 1962. Chiang Mai: Silk Worm Books. ISBN 978-974-9511-43-5.
- Prince Damrong Rajanubhab (1928). Chris Baker (ed.). Our Wars with the Burmese: Thai–Burmese Conflict 1539–1767. Translated by Aung Thein (2001 ed.). Bangkok: White Lotus. ISBN 974-7534-58-4.
- Dijk, Wil O. (2006). Seventeenth-century Burma and the Dutch East India Company, 1634–1680 (illustrated ed.). Singapore: NUS Press. ISBN 9789971693046.
- Fernquest, Jon (Spring 2005). "The Flight of Lao War Captives from Burma back to Laos in 1596: A Comparison of Historical Sources" (PDF). SOAS Bulletin of Burma Research. 3 (1). ISSN 1479-8484. Archived from the original (PDF) on 18 January 2022.
- Harvey, G. E. (1925). History of Burma: From the Earliest Times to 10 March 1824. London: Frank Cass & Co. Ltd – via archive.org.
- Htin Aung, Maung (1967). A History of Burma. New York and London: Cambridge University Press.
- Huxley, Andrew (2012). "Lord Kyaw Thu's Precedent: a Sixteenth Century Law Report". In Paul Dresch; Hannah Skoda (eds.). Legalism: Anthropology and History. Oxford: Oxford University Press. ISBN 9780191641473.
- James, Helen (2004). Keat Gin Ooi (ed.). Southeast Asia: a historical encyclopedia, from Angkor Wat to East Timor, Volume 2. ABC-CLIO. ISBN 1-57607-770-5.
- Kala, U (1724). Maha Yazawin (in Burmese). Vol. 1–3 (2006, 4th printing ed.). Yangon: Ya-Pyei Publishing.
- Lieberman, Victor B. (1984). Burmese Administrative Cycles: Anarchy and Conquest, c. 1580–1760. Princeton University Press. ISBN 0-691-05407-X.
- Lieberman, Victor B. (2003). Strange Parallels: Southeast Asia in Global Context, c. 800–1830, volume 1, Integration on the Mainland. Cambridge University Press. ISBN 978-0-521-80496-7.
- Maha Sithu (2012) [1798]. Kyaw Win; Thein Hlaing (eds.). Yazawin Thit (in Burmese). Vol. 1–3 (2nd ed.). Yangon: Ya-Pyei Publishing.
- Myint-U, Thant (2006). The River of Lost Footsteps—Histories of Burma. Farrar, Straus and Giroux. ISBN 978-0-374-16342-6.
- Phayre, Lt. Gen. Sir Arthur P. (1883). History of Burma (1967 ed.). London: Susil Gupta.
- Ratchasomphan (Sænluang.) (1994). David K. Wyatt (ed.). The Nan Chronicle. SEAP Publications. ISBN 9780877277156.
- Sein Lwin Lay, Kahtika U (1968). Mintaya Shwe Hti and Bayinnaung: Ketumadi Taungoo Yazawin (in Burmese) (2006, 2nd printing ed.). Yangon: Yan Aung Sarpay.
- Simms, Peter; Sanda Simms (2001). The Kingdoms of Laos: Six Hundred Years of History (illustrated ed.). Psychology Press. ISBN 9780700715312.
- Smith, Ronald Bishop (1966). Siam; Or, the History of the Thais: From 1569 A.D. to 1824 A.D. Vol. 2. Decatur Press.
- Stuart-Fox, Martin (2008). Historical Dictionary of Laos. Scarecrow Press. ISBN 9780810864115.
- Tarling, Nicholas (1999). The Cambridge History of Southeast Asia. Vol. 2 (illustrated ed.). Cambridge University Press. ISBN 9780521663700.
- Than Tun (1983). The Royal Orders of Burma, A.D. 1598–1885. Vol. 1. Kyoto: Kyoto University.
- Than Tun (2011). "23. Nga Zinga and Thida". Myanmar History Briefs (in Burmese). Yangon: Gangaw Myaing.
- Thaw Kaung, U (2010). Aspects of Myanmar History and Culture. Yangon: Gangaw Myaing.
- Thein Hlaing, U (2000). Research Dictionary of Burmese History (in Burmese) (2011, 3rd ed.). Yangon: Khit-Pya Taik.
- Yule, Capt. Henry (1857). Dr. Norton Shaw (ed.). "On the Geography of Burma and Its Tributary States". The Journal of the Royal Geographical Society. 27. London: The Royal Geographical Society.
