= Thado Minsaw (disambiguation) =

Thado Minsaw was a Burmese royal title and may refer to:

- Thado Minsaw of Prome: Founder of Prome Kingdom (r. 1482–1526)
- Thado Minsaw of Ava: Viceroy of Ava (r. 1555–1584)
- Hsinbyushin: King of Burma (r. 1763–1776)
- Thado Minsaw: Crown Prince of Burma (r. 1783–1808)
