= Thado Dhamma Yaza III of Prome =

Thado Dhamma Yaza III သတိုးဓမ္မရာဇာ

King of Prome
- Reign: 26 March 1595 – 15 September 1597
- Predecessor: Thado Thu
- Successor: Yan Naing

Viceroy of Prome
- Reign: 26 February 1589 – 26 March 1595
- Predecessor: Thado Dhamma Yaza II
- Successor: Thado Dhamma Yaza IV
- Born: c. 1571; Pegu (Bago); Toungoo Empire
- Died: 15 September [O.S. 5 September] 1597; Monday, 6th waxing of Thadingyut 959 ME; Prome (Pyay); Prome Kingdom
- House: Toungoo
- Father: Nanda
- Mother: Hanthawaddy Mibaya
- Religion: Theravada Buddhism

Thado Dhamma Yaza III (Burmese: သတိုးဓမ္မရာဇာ, pronounced [ðədó dəma̰ jàzà]; also known as Mingyi Hnaung (မင်းကြီးနှောင်း, [mɪ́ɴdʑí n̥áʊɴ]); c. 1571–1597) was viceroy of Prome (Pyay) from 1589 to 1595, and self-styled king of Prome from 1595 to 1597. Hnaung was initially a loyal vassal of his father King Nanda until 1594 when he openly clashed with his brother Crown Prince Minye Kyawswa. Hnaung revolted in 1595 during the Siamese siege of Pegu (Bago). His revolt started a string of other revolts by the major vassal states of the Toungoo Empire in the next two years. His attempts to take over territories beyond Prome's traditional vassals in the present-day Magwe Region were unsuccessful. The self-proclaimed king was assassinated by Yan Naing, one of his trusted advisers, on the eve of his planned invasion of Upper Burma in 1597.

== Early life ==
The future Thado Dhamma Yaza III was the youngest child of Crown Prince Nanda and his chief consort Hanthawaddy Mibaya. He was born c. 1571. (Note: Unlike with his two elder brothers, the royal chronicles provide no record of his birth. But given that his immediate older sibling Minye Kyawswa II of Ava was born in November 1567 per (Zata 1960: 47), the earliest he could have been born would be late 1568. Per (Maha Yazawin Vol. 2 2006: 324–335), Nanda was on military campaigns in Siam and Lan Xang between October 1568 to June 1570, arriving back at Pegu on 21 June 1570 (10th waxing of Waso 932 ME). Hnaung was most probably born in 1571 at the earliest.) His personal name was Mingyi Hnaung.

The prince grew up at the Kanbawzathadi Palace the last years of his grandfather King Bayinnaung. On 10 October 1581, Nanda succeeded Bayinnaung, and inherited the Toungoo Empire, the largest empire in Southeast Asia. Hnaung became the third in line of succession behind his elder brothers Mingyi Swa, the heir-apparent, and Minye Kyawswa. But Nanda did not have the support of his major vassals, who ruled what used to be sovereign kingdoms just a few decades earlier. By Hnaung's teenage years in the mid-1580s, the empire had already faced serious rebellions in Ava (Upper Burma) and Siam.

== Viceroy of Prome ==
=== Accession ===
Hnaung's first major assignment was to be king of Lan Xang. In September/October 1588, Pegu's vassal king Maha Ouparat of Lan Xang died. Nanda appointed Hnaung the next king of Lan Xang although he had reservations about sending his teenage son to the remote rebellion-prone kingdom. But in November/December, Thado Dhamma Yaza II, Viceroy of Prome, died, and Nanda changed his mind and appointed Hnaung at Prome, a strategic vassal state (present-day western Bago Region and Magwe Region). On 26 February [O.S. 16 February] 1589, (Note: (Maha Yazawin Vol. 3 2006: 89): Thursday, 14th waxing of Tabaung 950 ME = Sunday, 26 February 1589. The actual date may have been Thursday, 4th (not 14th) waxing of Tabaung 950 ME, which translates to Thursday, 16 February 1589.) Hnaung became viceroy with the title of Thado Dhamma Yaza III. His official style was King of Prome.

=== Early tenure ===
At Prome, one of his main responsibilities was to contribute manpower to his father's increasingly stretched military. At least in the beginning, the young viceroy apparently did not have much control over his own vassal rulers, a group that included Minye Uzana of Salin and Min Shwe Myat of Taingda, sons of the previous viceroy Thado Dhamma Yaza II. In 1590, he could contribute just a regiment to a 24-regiment (20,000-man) invasion force of Siam.

But he still helped out his father in some other way. He agreed to lead an expedition to suppress a rebellion in the Shan state of Mogaung (modern Kachin State). On 1 November [O.S. 22 October] 1590, he led a 10,000-man army, largely made up of conscripts from Upper Burma, and left for the front. Under his command was an eleven-year old Natshinnaung, his second cousin and the heir-presumptive of Toungoo (Taungoo). (The two grandsons of Bayinnaung would later become adversaries less than five years later.) The campaign was a success. His forces retook the fortified town in early 1591. Hnaung arrived at Pegu triumphantly in April 1591 but the capital was in no mood to celebrate. The fourth invasion of Siam had gone terribly wrong. The Burmese forces led by Crown Prince Mingyi Swa had been thoroughly routed in northern Siam by the Siamese army led by King Naresuan.

Hnaung was asked to join the debilitating war effort. By then, the tide was turning in favor of the former vassal state. In the dry season of 1591–92, Siam invaded Burma for the first time. Naresuan and his army advanced as far as Martaban (Mottama) before they were driven back. The Tenasserim coast now fell under Siamese control. The Pegu court responded by planning yet another invasion of Siam. Mingyi Swa would again lead the invasion with Hnaung and Natshinnaung as deputies. On 14 November [O.S. 4 November] 1592, three armies with a combined force of 24,000 men, 2000 horses, 150 elephants, left Pegu. The invasion came to a sudden halt on 8 January [O.S. 29 December 1592] 1593 when Mingyi Swa fell in action near Suphan Buri. Hnaung took over as the overall commander-in-chief, and decided to retreat.

=== Disillusionment with Pegu ===
The failed invasion further diminished Nanda's stature with his vassals. Worse yet, the High King's ability to project power was now severely hampered: Lower Burma, the only region over which the high king had direct control, was heavily depopulated. Tired of constant war, able men had fled military service to become monks, indentured servants, private retainers or refugees in the nearby kingdoms. Hnaung himself became disillusioned when the new Crown Prince Minye Kyawswa frantically set out to raise more men—again mainly from Lower Burma by branding men to facilitate identification, executing deserters, and forcing monks into the army. By late 1594, he openly clashed with his brother over the latter's aggressive tactics. Nanda was forced intervene, officially releasing the conscripted men and seized property.

But the damage was already done. The viceroy of Prome appeared to have decided to break away as early as late 1594. When the Siamese army invaded the Upper Tenasserim coast in October/November 1594, Nanda asked his vassals to send troops. Hnaung now behaved like most other vassals, promising to send help but never did. He did nothing even Siamese forces laid siege to Pegu in December. He gave the excuse that his army would coordinate with the armies from Toungoo (Taungoo) and Lan Na, and they would jointly break the siege.

=== Break from Pegu ===
By then, Hnaung had already decided to revolt. He plotted to gain control the Myelat (မြေလတ်, "Middle Country") region by seizing Toungoo. Over three months into the siege, in March 1595, combined Toungoo and Lan Na armies finally marched to Pegu from Toungoo. After getting the confirmation that Viceroy Minye Thihathu II of Toungoo had left with the army, Hnaung too began his march—not to Pegu but to Toungoo. As the combined Toungoo–Lan Na armies approached the Ayutthaya armies outside Pegu, Prome forces showed up at the gates of Toungoo c. 26 March [O.S. 16 March] 1595. (Note: (Maha Yazawin Vol. 3 2006: 96): Hnaung retreated upon hearing that the Siamese siege of Pegu had been broken. It probably took a day for the news to reach Toungoo, 200 km north. Since the Siamese retreated on 8 April, and since Prome's siege of Toungoo lasted 15 days, Prome's forces must have begun the siege of Toungoo around 26 March.) But Toungoo was heavily fortified, and equipped with artillery and musket corps. Its defenses were led by Natshinnaung, the heir-apparent of Toungoo. Hnaung laid siege to the city, counting on Minye Thihathu to be occupied or defeated by the Siamese army. But it was not to be. The combined armies broke the siege on 8 April [O.S. 29 March] 1595. (Note: (Maha Yazawin Vol. 3: 2006: 96): Thingyan [Akyo] day of 956 ME = 8 April 1595.) Hnaung decided to retreat as Minye Thihathu rushed back to Toungoo. Upon his arrival at Prome, he officially declared independence from his father.

== King of Prome ==
He was now king of western Middle Burma (mostly present-day Magwe Region). His vassals included Mindon, Taingda, Myede, Thayet, Sagu, Salin, and Pakhan. He did not seem to control Prome's traditional southern territories such as Tharrawaddy, which were close to Pegu. At any rate, Hnaung was not interested in taking over Lower Burma; he instead set his sights on Ava (Upper Burma), the control of which would give him access to a far larger pool of conscripts. He may have reasoned that Upper Burma, which had not had a viceroy since December 1593 following Nanda's policy of devolution in the north, would be unable to put up a coordinated defense. (Ava had been administered by Chief Minister Bala Yawda and Military Commissioner Let-Yway-Gyi Myin Hmu.)

But Hnaung's designs would be vigorously contested. Nanda appointed Thissa, Gov. of Nyaungyan and a son of Bayinnaung by a junior queen, to lead Ava's defenses. Thissa (commonly known as Nyaungyan Min) agreed to Nanda's order out of his self-interest for he could not allow anyone else to take over Upper Burma. In the dry season of 1596–97, the forces led by Nyaungyan and Let-Yway-Gyi Myin Hmu launched an attack on Prome's northernmost possessions. The northern forces took a heavily fortified Pakhan, the northernmost Prome possession 120 km south of Ava. After all the fighting was done, depleted Prome forces had fallen back to their next fortified garrison at Salin, 240 km south of Ava.

Hnaung was gravely concerned not only by the setback but also by the immediate developments afterwards. Toungoo and Lan Na both declared independence from Pegu c. April 1597. Nyaungyan too declared his intention to take over Ava, without Nanda's permission, on 19 April [O.S. 9 April] 1597, and begun taking allegiances from the local rulers in central Burma in the following months. (Note: (Than Tun Vol. 2 1985: 11 and 116): 5th waxing of Kason 959 ME = 19 April 1597. Per (Than Tun Vol. 2 1985: 11, 119), Nyaungyan "virtually declared" himself King of Ava on 9 May [O.S. 29 April] 1597 (Friday, 10th waning of Kason 959 ME) in the royal order announcing the appointment of Maha Okka Dhamma and Maha Okka Thena as chief ministers of his court.) He decided that he could not take on Nyaungyan on his own, and asked a newly independent Toungoo for an alliance against Nyaungyan. Minye Thihathu of Toungoo distrusted Hnaung, who after all had tried to take over Toungoo only a year earlier. But he could not allow Nyaungyan to consolidate Upper Burma, and agreed to a joint attack on Ava.

== Death ==
On 15 September [O.S. 5 September] 1597, as he was about to set sail with his flotilla to Ava, Thado Dhamma Yaza Mingyi Hnaung was assassinated by one of his trusted advisers, Gov. of Yan Naing. Prome's vanguard forces as well as Toungoo forces had already begun their march. He was to lead a 2000-man naval flotilla up the Irrawaddy River. His assassin Yan Naing had been a royal servant who had taken care of Hnaung since his birth. Hnaung actually asked his bodyguards to allow Yan Naing and his men to come aboard the royal barge. Yan Naing's men quickly seized the barge and forced Hnaung, who did not swim, into the river. He drowned. Yan Naing and his men also killed other senior princes of Prome.

== Aftermath ==
The news of the assassination quickly spread. Minye Thihathu opportunistically redirected the Toungoo army, which was already in the Ava territory, to attack Prome. The Prome troops led by Gov. Salin decided to submit to Nyaungyan. (Nyaungyan was forever grateful to Yan Naing for breaking up what would be a two-pronged attack by Prome and Toungoo. In 1605, as he lay dying, he asked his eldest son and heir-apparent Anaukpetlun to spare the life of Yan Naing when Prome was captured. When asked why, the king replied that if Yan Naing had not broken up the invasion, his then small army would likely have been defeated in a two-front war.)

== Bibliography ==
- Harvey, G. E. (1925). History of Burma: From the Earliest Times to 10 March 1824. London: Frank Cass & Co. Ltd.
- Kala, U (1724). Maha Yazawin (in Burmese). Vol. 1–3 (2006, 4th printing ed.). Yangon: Ya-Pyei Publishing.
- Lieberman, Victor B. (2003). Strange Parallels: Southeast Asia in Global Context, c. 800–1830, volume 1, Integration on the Mainland. Cambridge University Press. ISBN 978-0-521-80496-7.
- Maha Sithu (2012) [1798]. Kyaw Win; Thein Hlaing (eds.). Yazawin Thit (in Burmese). Vol. 1–3 (2nd ed.). Yangon: Ya-Pyei Publishing.
- Royal Historians of Burma (c. 1680). U Hla Tin (Hla Thamein) (ed.). Zatadawbon Yazawin (1960 ed.). Historical Research Directorate of the Union of Burma.
- Royal Historical Commission of Burma (1829–1832). Hmannan Yazawin (in Burmese). Vol. 1–3 (2003 ed.). Yangon: Ministry of Information, Myanmar.
- Than Tun (1983–1990). The Royal Orders of Burma, A.D. 1598–1885. Vol. 1–10. Kyoto: Kyoto University.

Thado Dhamma Yaza III of Prome Toungoo Dynasty Born: c. 1571 Died: 15 September 1597
Regnal titles
Preceded by Thado Thu	King of Prome; 26 March 1595 – 15 September 1597	Succeeded by Yan Naing
Royal titles
Preceded by Thado Dhamma Yaza II	Viceroy of Prome; 26 February 1589 – 26 March 1595	Succeeded by Thado Dhamma Yaza IV
