= Thado Minsaw of Ava =

16th-century Burmese Viceroy of Ava

Thado Minsaw သတိုးမင်းစော

Viceroy of Ava
- Reign: 19 February 1555 – 24 April 1584
- Predecessor: Narapati IV (King of Ava)
- Successor: Min Letya (Governor of Ava)
- Born: 20 May 1531; Saturday, 5th waxing of Nayon 893 ME; Toungoo (Taungoo), Toungoo Kingdom
- Died: May 1584 (~aged 53); Nayon 946 ME; Hkamti (modern Putao), Toungoo Empire
- Spouse: Inwa Mibaya
- Issue: Natshin Medaw
- House: Toungoo
- Father: Mingyi Swe
- Mother: sister of Shin Myo Myat
- Religion: Theravada Buddhism

Thado Minsaw (Burmese: သတိုးမင်းစော, pronounced [ðədó mɪ́ɴsɔ́]; 20 May 1531 – May 1584) was viceroy of Ava (Inwa) from 1555 to 1584 during the reigns of kings Bayinnaung and Nanda of Toungoo Dynasty of Burma (Myanmar). He fought alongside his brothers Bayinnaung, Minye Sithu, Thado Dhamma Yaza II and Minkhaung II, and his nephew Nanda in nearly every campaign from the 1550s to 1570s that rebuilt, expanded and defended the Toungoo Empire. Two years after Bayinnaung's death, he raised the first serious rebellion against the rule of Nanda. Although his rebellion was defeated in April 1584, it had set in motion more rebellions elsewhere that ultimately led to the collapse of the empire in the next 15 years.

== Early life ==
He was born on 20 May 1531 in the Toungoo Palace precincts to Mingyi Swe and the younger sister of Shin Myo Myat. His father was a father-in-law of King Tabinshwehti and one of the king's childhood servants. He was the youngest of Swe's seven children; his siblings were much older than him. He had an elder half-sister Dhamma Dewi, a principal queen of the king; three half-brothers Bayinnaung, Minye Sithu and Thado Dhamma Yaza II; and a full elder brother Minkhaung II. His birth name is unclear. The chronicles inconsistently report the name Zeya Nanda (ဇေယျနန္ဒ) as the name of the men who became Minkhaung II and Thado Minsaw in different parts. (Note: Maha Yazawin (Maha Yazawin Vol. 2 2006: 172) and Hmannan Yazawin (Hmannan Vol. 2 2003: 226) both say Zeya Nanda (later Minkhaung II) was married to Laygyun Mibaya in 1545. But later, the chronicles (Maha Yazawin Vol. 2 2006: 201) and (Hmannan Vol. 2 2003: 264) referred to the man later known as Thado Minsaw of Ava as Zeya Nanda.)

He grew up during a period in which Tabinshwehti, with the help of his brothers, was waging wars against his neighbors on his way to founding the Toungoo Empire. Like his brothers, he probably received a military-style education at the palace. Though he most probably joined his brothers in Tabinshwehti's last campaigns in the late 1540s, he had not gained a regimental commander rank, and thus is not mentioned in the chronicles. (Note: See the order of battle lists for Tabinshwehti's campaigns (1546–1549) in Maha Yazawin (Maha Yazawin Vol. 2 2006: 173–184).)

== Career ==
His chance to shine came after Tabinshwehti was assassinated on 30 April 1550. Every major viceroy and governor declared himself independent, and did not submit to Tabinshwehti's chosen successor Bayinnaung. His own brother Minkhaung II declared himself king of Toungoo (Taungoo). Like his other brothers, he sided with Bayinnaung. In September 1550, the 19-year-old was given command of a regiment, which took part in Bayinnaung's assault on Toungoo. In January 1551, Minkhaung II surrendered and was pardoned by Bayinnaung. Thado Minsaw was given a royal title of Minye Kyawhtin (မင်းရဲကျော်ထင်) on the same day. He again commanded a regiment in the Prome campaign (1551).

Thado Minsaw was one of the four deputies of Bayinnaung in the king's campaigns between 1552 and 1565 that greatly expanded the Toungoo Empire. The original four were Bayinnaung's four brothers: Minye Sithu, Thado Dhamma Yaza, Minkhaung and Thado Minsaw. After Minye Sithu's death in 1556, Bayinnaung's eldest son Nanda took his place. Bayinnaung was impressed with his younger half-brother. The king appointed him viceroy of Ava on 19 February 1555 with the style of Thado Minsaw.

The following is a list of campaigns in which Thado Minsaw participated during the reign of Bayinnaung. Chronicles do not report his participation in Manipur (1560), Mohnyin and Mogaung (1571), Lan Xang (1572), Lan Xang (1574), Mohnyin and Mogaung (1576–1577).

Campaign	Duration	Troops commanded	Notes
Toungoo	1550–1551	1000	Led a regiment
Prome	1551	1000	Led a regiment
Hanthawaddy	1552	1000, 2500	Initially led a regiment. After Pegu, his was one of two 2500-strong armies (Note: Maha Yazawin (Maha Yazawin Vol. 2 2006: 209) says the total force was 2000 but Hmannan (Hmannan Vol. 2 2003: 275) corrects it to 5000.) to Bassein (Pathein). Defeated Smim Htaw's army outside Bassein.
Ava	1553	1 regiment	Led a regiment in attempt to invade Ava. But the campaign was called off.
Ava	1554–1555	7 regiments	Led a vanguard army that invaded Ava via Pintale from the center while Minkhaung II led another army that invaded via Yamethin from the right flank. The two armies drove back Avan defenses into the city walls. After Ava fell, the two armies followed up on the armies of Mohnyin, Mogaung, and Kale in the Mu valley and defeated them there.
Shan states	1557	8 regiments, 2 cavalry battalions	Led an army. Along with Minkhaung II's and Nanda's army, his army converged on to Thibaw, part of a three-pronged attack. Led the vanguard army to the march to Mohnyin and Mogaung. Defeated both Mohynin and Mogaung forces before rearguard armies arrived.
Mone	1557	8,000	Led the army that retook Thibaw while other armies invaded Mone.
Lan Na	1558	8 regiments and 2 cavalry battalions	Led one of the three vanguard armies. He marched from the left flank while Thado Dhamma Yaza II and Nanda marched from the center and the right flank respectively. They were followed by the main army (Bayinnaung) and one rearguard army (Minkhaung II).
Trans-Salween Chinese Shan states	1563	12,000	Led one of the four armies that invaded the trans-Salween states. His army invaded from Momeit.
Siam	1563–1564	14,000	He and Thado Dhamma Yaza II jointly-attacked and conquered Phitsanulok in December 1563. Attacked the fort defending Ayutthaya.
Lan Na	1564	12,000	His army invaded Lan Na from Mone while four armies invaded from Siam. Did not see any action for Lan Na surrendered before his army arrived at Chiang Mai.
Lan Xang	1564–1565	10,000	Led one of three armies that invaded Lan Xang. Led the attack on Vientiane. When he was hit by an enemy spear on his right thigh, he famously cut down the wooden handle of the spear with his sword, and continued charging on horseback with the spearhead still inside his thigh. (Note: (Thaw Kaung 2010: 116): This valiant act is neatly transferred to Bayinnaung in a popular (fictional) work by U Maung Gyi. According to Maung Gyi, it was Bayinnaung who cut off the spear's wooden handle while charging on at the battle of Pegu.)
Siam	1568–1569	11,000	Led one of the five armies that invaded Siam
Lan Xang	1569–1570	11,000	Led of one of the three armies that invaded Lan Xang from the north. His army consisted of 11 regiments invaded from Lampang. It saw little action but suffered from a lack of provision and punishing terrain. His army spent three months in the jungles of Lan Xang.
Mohnyin and Mogaung	1574–1575	6,000+	Led army consisting of 6 regiments and 8 cavalry battalions. Did not see any action. Combed the northern jungles but could not find the rebel saophas.
Mohnyin and Mogaung	1575–1576	10,000	His regiments again combed northern jungles. Found and killed the saopha of Mohnyin but could not capture the saopha of Mogaung.

He was a loyal brother. He built the Ava gate of Pegu (Bago) when the capital was rebuilt between 1565 and 1568. (Each of the twenty gates of the new capital was built by key vassal rulers.) For their loyal service, Thado Dhamma Yaza II, Minkhaung II and Thado Minsaw were all honored by their brother the king on 3 March 1580.

== Rebellion against Nanda ==
Bayinnaung died on 10 October 1581, and was succeeded by his son Nanda. The new king faced an impossible task of maintaining an empire ruled by autonomous viceroys who were loyal to Bayinnaung, not the kingdom of Toungoo. In particular, Thado Minsaw did not respect his nephew Nanda who was four years his junior. Nanda apparently too was suspicious of Thado Minsaw's intentions. The mistrust was despite the fact that both were related to each other many times over. (Nanda was Thado Minsaw's nephew. Nanda's elder sister was Thado Minsaw's wife. Thado Minsaw's only child was married to Nanda's son and heir apparent, Mingyi Swa.) They had fought alongside each other over three decades.

At any rate, when two Chinese Shan states revolted in September/October 1582, (Note: (Maha Yazawin Vol. 2 2006: 78): Thadingyut 944 ME = 27 September 1582 to 25 October 1582 NS) the king appointed Thado Dhamma Yaza II of Prome and Nawrahta Minsaw of Lan Na to lead two armies to put it down. Although the majority of the troops were drawn from Upper Burma and Shan states, he did not appoint the viceroy of the province to lead the invasion.

The conspicuous slight did not go unnoticed at Ava. By June/July 1583, (Note: (Maha Yazawin Vol. 2 2006: 79): Waso 945 ME = 19 June 1583 to 17 July 1583 NS) Thado Minsaw had waited long enough. He sent secret embassies to Prome, Toungoo and Chiang Mai to launch a simultaneous revolt against Nanda. His intention was not to seek Nanda's position but to rule Ava independently. The three viceroys sided with Nanda and secretly forwarded the news to Nanda. At Pegu, Nanda was particularly concerned that Ava had the support of the Shan states. To counter the manpower of Upper Burma, Nanda secretly ordered troops from Prome, Toungoo, Lan Na, Lan Xang and Siam during the dry season of 1583–1584. In March 1584, armies from Prome, Toungoo, Lan Na, Lan Xang and Siam marched to Ava. Nanda's army left Pegu for Ava on 25 March 1584.

At Ava, Thado Minsaw did not lose composure. He asked his loyalists from the Shan states to send help while his army tried to hold off the invading armies. On 24 April 1584, (Note: (Maha Yazawin Vol. 2 2006: 80): Tuesday, 1st waning of Kason 946 ME = 24 April 1584 NS; 14 April 1584 OS) the two armies met at the outskirts of Ava. Thado Minsaw's army was inside the Tada-U fort while the invading armies led by Nanda were at Pinya. Faced with an overwhelming force, Thado Minsaw issued a challenge to Nanda to fight each other on their war elephants. Nanda accepted. The two then fought in a long drawn out battle to the point where both their elephants became tired. No one dared to intervene. Finally, Thado Minsaw's elephant backed away while Nanda jumped on a fresh elephant to continue the battle. Thado Minsaw chose not to fight anymore. He and 2000 of his men fled to their fort near Mandalay Hill. From there they trekked to northern hills with a plan to seek help from China. He died en route at Hkamti.

== Aftermath ==
Thado Minsaw's rebellion was to have a more lasting impact, however. The Siamese army, led by Naresuan, never marched to Ava as ordered, and hung around Pegu waiting for the news. When Ava was defeated, the Siamese army retreated to Martaban (Mottama) and declared independence on 3 May 1584. The ensuing unsuccessful campaigns against Siam ultimately led to the downfall of the empire in the next 15 years.

== Family ==
His chief queen was Inwa Mibaya, the eldest daughter of Bayinnaung. He married his niece at his coronation ceremony at Ava in February 1555. The couple had just one child Natshin Medaw. He had no other children. Natshin Medaw was the chief queen of Mingyi Swa, the heir-apparent of Nanda.

== Bibliography ==
- Htin Aung, Maung (1967). A History of Burma. New York and London: Cambridge University Press.
- Kala, U (1724). Maha Yazawin (in Burmese). Vol. 1–3 (2006, 4th printing ed.). Yangon: Ya-Pyei Publishing.
- Lieberman, Victor B. (2003). Strange Parallels: Southeast Asia in Global Context, c. 800–1830, volume 1, Integration on the Mainland. Cambridge University Press. ISBN 978-0-521-80496-7.
- Royal Historians of Burma (c. 1680). U Hla Tin (Hla Thamein) (ed.). Zatadawbon Yazawin (1960 ed.). Historical Research Directorate of the Union of Burma.
- Royal Historical Commission of Burma (1832). Hmannan Yazawin (in Burmese). Vol. 1–3 (2003 ed.). Yangon: Ministry of Information, Myanmar.
- Sein Lwin Lay, Kahtika U (1968). Mintaya Shwe Hti and Bayinnaung: Ketumadi Taungoo Yazawin (in Burmese) (2006, 2nd printing ed.). Yangon: Yan Aung Sarpay.
- Thaw Kaung, U (2010). Aspects of Myanmar History and Culture. Yangon: Gangaw Myaing.

Thado Minsaw of Ava Toungoo Dynasty Born: 20 May 1531 Died: May 1584
Regnal titles
Preceded by Narapati IV as King of Ava	Viceroy of Ava; 19 February 1555 – 24 April 1584	Succeeded by Min Letya as Governor of Ava
