= Maha Dewi =

Maha Dewi (Mahādevī) was a Burmese royal title.

It may mean:

- Maha Dewi of Hanthawaddy: Regent of Hanthawaddy (r. 1383–1384)
- Maha Dewi of Toungoo: Queen of the Western Palace of Toungoo (r. 1510–1530)
- Wisutthithewi: Queen Regnant of Lanna Kingdom (r. 1564-1578)
- Maha Dewi (Sanay Min): Chief Queen Consort of Toungoo Dynasty (r. 1698–1714)
- Maha Dewi Saw Nyein Oo: Queen Mother of King Alaungpaya
