= Minye Sithu of Martaban =

Minye Sithu မင်းရဲစည်သူ Thiri Zeya Kyawhtin

Viceroy of Martaban
- Reign: 6 June 1552 – March 1556
- Predecessor: Smim Htaw
- Successor: Minye Nandameit
- Born: c. 1520; Toungoo (Taungoo)
- Died: March 1556; Martaban (Mottama)
- Spouse: granddaughter of Baya Nandameit
- Issue: Minye Nandameit (son) two daughters
- House: Toungoo
- Father: Mingyi Swe
- Mother: Shin Myo Myat
- Religion: Theravada Buddhism

Minye Sithu (Burmese: မင်းရဲစည်သူ, pronounced [mɪ́ɴjɛ́ sìθù]; c. 1520–1556) was viceroy of Martaban (Mottama) from 1552 to 1556. The eldest younger brother of Bayinnaung was appointed governor of Zayweon by King Tabinshwehti in 1541, and viceroy of Martaban in 1552 by Bayinnaung. He participated in the military campaigns of the Toungoo Empire from 1534, and as a commander from 1540 to 1555.

== Early life ==
He was born c. 1520 at the Toungoo Palace to Mingyi Swe and Shin Myo Myat, royal household servants of Crown Prince Tabinshwehti. (Note: He was probably born three or four years after the birth of Tabinshwehti since his mother was hired to be the prince's wet nurse.) He had one elder sister, Dhamma Dewi, an elder brother, Bayinnaung, and a younger brother, Thado Dhamma Yaza II. He also had two younger half-brothers, Minkhaung II and Thado Minsaw who were born to his aunt (his mother's younger sister) and his father.

== Military career ==
He participated in Toungoo's campaigns against Hanthawaddy (1534–41), and by 1540 had achieved the rank of regimental commander with the style of Thiri Zeya Kyawhtin (သီရိဇေယျကျော်ထင်). He was appointed governor of Zayweon (modern Labutta) in 1541 by Tabinshwehti. He served as a regimental commander in Toungoo's campaigns against Prome (1541–42) and Ava Kingdom (1543–44). He led a naval squadron in the Arakan campaign (1546–47). He led an elephant battalion in the Siam campaign of (1548–49). In 1550, he joined his brothers Bayinnaung and Thado Dhamma Yaza II on the campaign to suppress the rebellion of Smim Htaw.

He was a key member of Bayinnaung's drive to restore the Toungoo Empire which fell apart after Tabinshwehti was assassinated on 30 April 1550. He led a regiment in Bayinnaung's 1550–51 assault on the city of Toungoo, whose ruler Minkhaung II was their own half-brother. He was given a royal title of Minye Sithu on 11 January 1551 by Bayinnaung after Minkhaung surrendered on the same day. Minye Sithu led an army in the Prome campaign (1551) and in the Pegu campaign (1552). Bayinnaung appointed Minye Sithu viceroy of Martaban on 6 June 1552 (Monday, 14th waxing of Waso 914 ME).

In November 1554, Minye Sithu for the first time did not accompany his elder brother to the front when Toungoo forces marched to Ava (Inwa). He was given the responsibility to guard the rear against a possible attack by Siam. He led the forces that guarded the upper Tenasserim coast down to Ye.

== Family ==
The viceroy's principal queen was a granddaughter of Baya Nandameit of Dwarawaddy, a descendant of Toungoo royalty. They were married at the coronation ceremony of Tabinshwehti in 1545. He had three children: one son (Minye Nandameit) and two daughters. In July 1554, his elder daughter was married to Thiri Dhammathawka, former governor of Sandoway (Thandwe) and a son of King Min Bin of Arakan. The Arakanese prince had fled his homeland, having lost a succession struggle there. Minye Sithu's younger daughter too was married to Thiri Dhammathawka in January 1567 after her elder sister had died. (Note: (Maha Yazawin Vol. 2 2006: 293): The younger daughter was married to her brother-in-law on 16 January 1567 (6th waxing of Tabodwe 928 ME).)

== Death ==
Minye Sithu died in March 1556. (Note: He likely died in March 1556 although chronicles (Maha Yazawin Vol. 2 2006: 227) simply say that he died in 917 ME (30 March 1555 to 28 March 1556). The entry of his death comes after the entry dated 8th waning of Tabaung 917 ME (3 March 1556).)

== Bibliography ==
- Kala, U (1724). Maha Yazawin (in Burmese). Vol. 1–3 (2006, 4th printing ed.). Yangon: Ya-Pyei Publishing.
- Sein Lwin Lay, Kahtika U (1968). Mintaya Shwe Hti and Bayinnaung: Ketumadi Taungoo Yazawin (in Burmese) (2006, 2nd printing ed.). Yangon: Yan Aung Sarpay.

Minye Sithu of Martaban Toungoo Dynasty Born: c. 1520 Died: March 1556
Regnal titles
Preceded by Smim Htaw	Viceroy of Martaban; 6 June 1552 – March 1556	Succeeded by Minye Nandameit
