= Maha Dewi of Toungoo =

Maha Dewi မဟာဒေဝီ

Queen of the Western Palace
- Tenure: 16 October 1510 – 24 November 1530
- Predecessor: New office
- Successor: Min Taya Medaw
- Spouse: Mingyi Nyo
- Issue: none
- House: Toungoo
- Religion: Theravada Buddhism

Maha Dewi (Burmese: မဟာဒေဝီ, pronounced [məhà dèwì]; Pali: Mahādevī) was a principal queen consort of King Mingyi Nyo of Toungoo Dynasty. She was also known as Wadi Mibaya (ဝတီး မိဖုရား). On 11 April 1511, Mingyi Nyo held his coronation ceremony, in which he bestowed her the title of Maha Dewi. She had no children.

== Bibliography ==
- Royal Historical Commission of Burma (1832). Hmannan Yazawin (in Burmese). Vol. 1–3 (2003 ed.). Yangon: Ministry of Information, Myanmar.
- Sein Lwin Lay, Kahtika U (1968). Mintaya Shwe Hti and Bayinnaung: Ketumadi Taungoo Yazawin (in Burmese) (2006, 2nd printing ed.). Yangon: Yan Aung Sarpay.

Maha Dewi of Toungoo Toungoo Dynasty
Royal titles
| New title | Queen of the Western Palace of Toungoo; 16 October 1510 – 24 November 1530 | Succeeded by Min Taya Medaw |
