= Thado Dhamma Yaza II of Prome =

Thado Dhamma Yaza II သတိုးဓမ္မရာဇာ Nanda Yawda

Viceroy of Prome
- Reign: 30 August 1551 – November/December 1588
- Predecessor: Thado Dhamma Yaza I
- Successor: Thado Dhamma Yaza III
- Born: 1520s Toungoo (Taungoo)
- Died: November/December 1588; Natdaw 950 ME; Prome (Pyay)
- Spouse: Salin Mibaya
- Issue among others...: Hsinbyushin Medaw; Min Taya Medaw
- House: Toungoo
- Father: Mingyi Swe
- Mother: Shin Myo Myat
- Religion: Theravada Buddhism

Thado Dhamma Yaza II of Prome (Burmese: ပြည် သတိုးဓမ္မရာဇာ, pronounced [ðədó dəma̰ jàzà]; 1520s–1588), personal name Nandayodha (နန္ဒယော်ဓာ), was viceroy of Prome (Pyay) from 1551 to 1588, during the reigns of kings Bayinnaung and Nanda of Toungoo Dynasty of Burma (Myanmar). Having begun his military career in the service of King Tabinshwehti, the youngest full brother of Bayinnaung was part of the small core group loyal to Bayinnaung, following the assassination of Tabinshwehti in 1550. Alongside his brothers Bayinnaung, Minye Sithu, Minkhaung II, Thado Minsaw and his nephew Nanda, he fought in nearly every campaign between 1550 and 1584 that rebuilt, expanded and defended the Toungoo Empire.

== Early life ==
He was born in the Toungoo Palace precincts to Mingyi Swe and Shin Myo Myat, royal household servants of Crown Prince Tabinshwehti. He had an elder sister, Dhamma Dewi, two elder brothers, Bayinnaung and Minye Sithu, and two younger half-brothers, Minkhaung II and Thado Minsaw who were born to his aunt (his mother's younger sister) and his father. He grew up in the palace precincts, and received a military-style education there.

== Career ==
=== Tabinshwehti era (1534–1550) ===
He participated in the Toungoo–Hanthawaddy War (1534–1541), and by 1540 had achieved the rank of regimental commander with the style of Nanda Yawda (နန္ဒယော်ဓာ). He was appointed governor of Thamyindon (သမြင်းတုံ) in the Irrawaddy delta in 1541 by Tabinshwehti. He served as a regimental commander in Toungoo's campaigns against Prome (1541–1542), led a naval squadron in the Arakan campaign (1546–1547), and commanded an elephant battalion in the invasion of Siam (1548–1549). (Note: Chronicles (Maha Yazawin Vol. 2 2006: 167) do not mention his participation in the war with the Confederation of Shan States in 1543–1544.) In January 1550, he joined his brothers Bayinnaung and Minye Sithu on the campaign to suppress the rebellion of Smim Htaw.

=== Bayinnaung era (1550–1581) ===
He was a key member of Bayinnaung's drive to restore the Toungoo Empire which had fallen apart after Tabinshwehti was assassinated on 30 April 1550. He led a regiment in Bayinnaung's 1550–1551 assault on the city of Toungoo, whose ruler Minkhaung II was their own half-brother. He was given a royal title of Thado Dhamma Yaza on 11 January 1551 by Bayinnaung after Minkhaung II surrendered and was pardoned on the same day. He commanded the Irrawaddy flank in the Prome campaign (March–August 1551). Prome was taken on 30 August 1551, and Bayinnaung appointed him as the viceroy of Prome.

Thado Dhamma Yaza II was one of the four deputies of Bayinnaung in the king's campaigns between 1552 and 1565 that greatly expanded the Toungoo Empire. The original four were Bayinnaung's four brothers: Minye Sithu, Thado Dhamma Yaza, Minkhaung and Thado Minsaw. After Minye Sithu's death in 1556, Bayinnaung's eldest son Nanda took his place. Thado Dhamma Yaza participated in every campaign except for Manipur (1560) and Lan Xang (1565). (Note: See campaigns between 1554 and 1565 in chronicles (Maha Yazawin Vol. 2 2006: 215–285).) Bayinnaung had built the largest empire in the history of Southeast Asia. After a brief respite, he faced serious rebellions in Lan Xang and Siam in 1568, later joined by northern Shan states in the 1570s. Thado Dhamma Yaza along with the other three deputies of the king were called upon to suppress the rebellions.

The following is a list of campaigns in which he participated during the reign of Bayinnaung.

Campaign	Duration	Troops commanded	Notes
Toungoo	1550–1551	1000	Led a regiment
Prome	1551	not given	Commanded an army and a flotilla down the Irrawaddy to Prome
Hanthawaddy	1552	not given	Part of the joint-naval-land forces that conquered the Irrawaddy delta. He commanded the navy while Minkhaung II led the army.
Ava	1554–1555	11,000 (navy)	Fought several naval battles at the confluence of the Chindwin and the Irrawaddy en route to Ava, enabling the army to take Sagaing opposite Ava. After Ava was taken, his navy sailed up the Irrawaddy in support of the armies which secured the allegiance of Upper Burma regions. The navy itself defeated the remnants of resistance at Singu and took the town.
Shan states	1557	18,000 (navy transport) (Note: (Maha Yazawin Vol. 2 2006: 231, footnote by editors): Maha Yazawin says 12,000 but later chronicles Yazawin Thit and Hmannan Yazawin give as 18,000.); 8,000 (army)	Led the rearguard navy that transported the majority of the troops to Ava, and switched to commanding an army group that invaded the Shan country.
Mone	1557	8,000	Led the vanguard army that took Mobye (northern Kayah State) and other towns en route to Mone. His army took Mone without a fight.
Lan Na	1558	10 infantry regiments and 2 cavalry battalions	Led one of the three vanguard armies; his was at the center while Thado Minsaw's army marched from the left flank and Nanda's army on the right flank, followed by the main army (Bayinnaung) and one rearguard army (Minkhaung II).
Trans-Salween Chinese Shan states	1563	12,000	Led one of the four armies that invaded the trans-Salween states. His army invaded from Thibaw.
Siam	1563–1564	14,000	He and Thado Minsaw jointly-attacked and conquered Phitsanulok in December 1563. He switched to leading the navy down the Chao Phraya. His navy defeated the Siamese navy en route to Ayutthaya but was stopped by three Portuguese ships guarding Ayutthaya.
Lan Na	1564	12,000	One of four armies that marched to Chiang Mai from Ayutthaya. Reinforced by troops from Theinni and Kengtung, his army marched to Chiang Rai and Chiang Saen to secure allegiance.
Siam	1568–1569	11,000	Led one of the five armies that invaded Siam
Lan Xang	1569–1570	11,000	Led of one of the three armies that invaded Lan Xang from the north. His army consisted of 11 regiments invaded from Lampang. It saw little action but suffered from a lack of provision and punishing terrain. His army spent three months in the jungles of Lan Xang.
Mohnyin and Mogaung	1571	12,000	Led the navy that transported the troops from Lower Burma to the north. His troops chased the renegade saophas in the jungle but could not find them.
Lan Xang	1574	11,000	Led one of four armies, which took Lan Xang without a fight.
Mohnyin and Mogaung	1575–1576	7,000	His army did not see any action.

He proved to be a loyal brother. He built the Prome gate of Pegu (Bago) when the capital was rebuilt between 1565 and 1568. (Each of the twenty gates of the new capital was built by key vassal rulers.) For their loyal service, Thado Dhamma Yaza II, Minkhaung II and Thado Minsaw were all honored by their brother the king on 3 March 1580.

=== Nanda era (1581–1588) ===
Bayinnaung died on 10 October 1581, and was succeeded by his son Nanda. The new king faced an impossible task of maintaining an empire ruled by autonomous viceroys who were loyal to Bayinnaung, not the kingdom of Toungoo. Nanda particularly distrusted his uncle Thado Minsaw of Ava. When two Chinese Shan states Sanda and Thaungthut revolted in August/September 1582, (Note: (Maha Yazawin Vol. 2 2006: 78): Thadingyut 944 ME = 21 August 1582 to 19 September 1582) the high king asked Thado Dhamma Yaza II and Nawrahta Minsaw of Lan Na to lead two 8000-strong armies to quell the rebellion. (The king conspicuously did not ask Thado Minsaw to take part in the campaign although Ava contributed troops and the Shan states were closer to Ava.) The two armies laid siege to Sanda (present-day Baoshan prefecture) for nearly five months until the starving city surrendered. The armies arrived back to Pegu in April 1583. (Note: (Maha Yazawin Vol. 2 2006: 78): Arrived back around the new year's day, which was 8 April 1583.)

Nanda's slight of Thado Minsaw did not go unnoticed. In June/July 1583, (Note: (Maha Yazawin Vol. 2 2006: 79): Waso 945 ME = 19 June 1583 to 17 July 1583) Thado Minsaw sent secret embassies to Prome, Toungoo and Chiang Mai to launch a simultaneous revolt against Nanda. He also sent missions to Shan states for their support. Thado Dhamma Yaza and the other viceroys sided with Nanda. When Nanda marched to Ava in March 1584, he along with the rulers of Toungoo and Chiang Mai also marched to Ava. Ava turned out to be Thado Dhamma Yaza's last campaign. He did not participate in the ensuing campaigns against Siam, which revolted in May 1584.

Thado Dhamma Yaza II died in November/December 1588. (Note: (Maha Yazawin Vol. 3 2006: 89): Natdaw 950 ME = 19 November 1588 to 17 December 1588) He was succeeded by Mingyi Hnaung, one of Nanda's sons, styled as Thado Dhamma Yaza III of Prome.

== Family ==
His chief queen was Salin Mibaya, who was a daughter of King Bayin Htwe of Prome and a descendant of Ava royalty. They were married in 1545 in Pegu at the coronation ceremony of Tabinshwehti. He had two daughters by his chief queen. The elder daughter Hsinbyushin Medaw became the chief queen of Nawrahta Minsaw, the viceroy (and later king) of Lan Na. The younger daughter Min Taya Medaw was a major queen of Nanda.

He also had seven sons and two daughters by minor queens and concubines. They were:

1. Nanda Yawda (birth name Shin Zin), who married his first cousin Myat Myo Hpone Wai (daughter of Bayinnaung) and became governor of Sagaing. Captured and brought to Mrauk-U in 1600 where he was given the title of Minye Theinkhathu.
2. Min Shwe Myat, governor of Taingda
3. Minye Uzana, governor of Salin
4. Princess of Saku
5. Governor of Malun, captured and sent to Arakan
6. Shin Ne Myo, killed by Yan Naing in 1597
7. Shin Ne Tun, killed by Yan Naing in 1597
8. Pyinsa Thiha, governor of Moulmein
9. Aetheinnawaddy, who married with Shin Htwe Kyaing, the one son of King Bayinnaung

== Bibliography ==
- Htin Aung, Maung (1967). A History of Burma. New York and London: Cambridge University Press.
- Kala, U (1724). Maha Yazawin (in Burmese). Vol. 1–3 (2006, 4th printing ed.). Yangon: Ya-Pyei Publishing.
- Lieberman, Victor B. (2003). Strange Parallels: Southeast Asia in Global Context, c. 800–1830, volume 1, Integration on the Mainland. Cambridge University Press. ISBN 978-0-521-80496-7.
- Sein Lwin Lay, Kahtika U (1968). Mintaya Shwe Hti and Bayinnaung: Ketumadi Taungoo Yazawin (in Burmese) (2006, 2nd printing ed.). Yangon: Yan Aung Sarpay.

Thado Dhamma Yaza II of Prome Toungoo Dynasty Born: c. 1520s Died: c. Nov/Dec 1588
Regnal titles
Preceded by Thado Dhamma Yaza I	Viceroy of Prome; 30 August 1551 – November/December 1588	Succeeded by Thado Dhamma Yaza III
