= Shin Myo Myat =

Shin Myo Myat ရှင်မျိုးမြတ်
- Born: c. 1490s Toungoo (Taungoo)
- Died: 1520s Toungoo
- Spouse: Mingyi Swe
- Issue: Dhamma Dewi; Bayinnaung; Minye Sithu; Thado Dhamma Yaza II
- House: Toungoo
- Father: Kywe Sit Min
- Religion: Theravada Buddhism

Shin Myo Myat (Burmese: ရှင်မျိုးမြတ်, pronounced [ʃɪ̀ɴ mjó mjaʔ]; c. 1490s – c. 1520s) was the mother of King Bayinnaung of Toungoo Dynasty of Burma (Myanmar), and the wet nurse of King Tabinshwehti. In 1516, she and her husband Mingyi Swe were hired to the household staff responsible for the royal infant Tabinshwehti. Although the Royal Chronicles proclaim her as a fifth generation descendant of King Thihathu of Pinya (r. 1310–1325) and his chief queen Mi Saw U of Pagan Dynasty, oral traditions insist that she and her husband were commoners from either Pagan (Bagan) or Toungoo (Taungoo) regions.

Despite Chronicles' posthumous proclamation of her royal descent, Myo Myat died in the 1520s as a royal servant and did not see her children enter the highest ranks of Toungoo royalty. Her eldest child Khin Hpone Soe became a principal queen of Tabinshwehti in 1530, and her second child Ye Htut (Bayinnaung) married the king's half-sister Princess Thakin Gyi in 1534. Her husband, who remarried after her death to her younger sister, became viceroy of Toungoo between 1540 and 1549. During Bayinnaung's reign, her other two sons became viceroys of Martaban (Mottama) and Prome (Pyay) with the respective styles of Minye Sithu and Thado Dhamma Yaza II in 1552, and her brother Sithu was appointed governor of Pagan (Bagan) in 1551.

== Bibliography ==
- Harvey, G. E. (1925). History of Burma: From the Earliest Times to 10 March 1824. London: Frank Cass & Co. Ltd.
- Royal Historical Commission of Burma (1832). Hmannan Yazawin (in Burmese). Vol. 1–3 (2003 ed.). Yangon: Ministry of Information, Myanmar.
- Sein Lwin Lay, Kahtika U (1968). Mintaya Shwe Hti and Bayinnaung: Ketumadi Taungoo Yazawin (in Burmese) (2006, 2nd printing ed.). Yangon: Yan Aung Sarpay.
- Thaw Kaung, U (2010). Aspects of Myanmar History and Culture. Yangon: Gangaw Myaing.
