= Victor Lieberman =

American historian (born 1945)

- Born: July 22, 1945 (age 81)

Academic background
- Education: Yale University, School of Oriental and African Studies, University of London

Academic work
- Main interests: History of Southeast Asia

Victor B. Lieberman (born 22 July 1945) is an American historian of early modern Southeast Asia and Eurasia. He presently serves as the Raoul Wallenberg Distinguished University Professor of History and Professor of Asian and Comparative History at the University of Michigan, where he began teaching in 1984.

In 1984, he published a seminal work, Burmese Administrative Cycles: Anarchy and Conquest, c.1580–1760 (Princeton University Press), which profoundly impacted scholarship on mainland Southeast Asia through an analysis of alternating governance patterns in 16th- to 18th-century Burma. Totaling some 1,500 pages, his more recent two-volume study Strange Parallels: Southeast Asia in Global Context, c. 800–1830 (Cambridge University Press) argued that in terms of basic dynamics, chronology, and trajectory, patterns of political and cultural integration in mainland Southeast Asia over several centuries resembled those in much of Europe and Japan, and to a lesser extent, in China and South Asia. A lead featured review in the principal journal of history, The American Historical Review, in 2012 (vol. 117, no. 4) claimed that "Lieberman's two-volume magnum opus is the most important work of history produced so far this century."

Two international conferences, in London and Osaka, have been held to discuss Lieberman's scholarship, and each of the two chief journals of Asian studies, Modern Asian Studies (1997) and The Journal of Asian Studies (2011), has devoted a special edition to his work. His books have won prizes from the World History Association and the Association for Asian Studies. In 2014, he won the Golden Apple Award, conferred by student ballot, as the best teacher at the University of Michigan.

Lieberman graduated first in his class and summa cum laude from Yale University in 1967, and was the recipient of the Warren Memorial High Scholarship Prize as the highest ranking Bachelor of the Arts candidate. He obtained a PhD in Southeast Asian history from the School of Oriental and African Studies, University of London in 1976.

== Publications ==
- Burmese Administrative Cycles: Anarchy and Conquest, c. 1580–1760 (1984)
- Beyond Binary Histories: Re-imagining Eurasia to c. 1830 , edited (1999)
- Strange Parallels: Southeast Asia in Global Context, c. 800–1830. Volume 1: Integration on the Mainland (2003)
- Strange Parallels: Southeast Asia in Global Context, c. 800–1830. Volume 2: Mainland Mirrors: Europe, Japan, China, South Asia, and the Islands (2009)
- The Hundred-Year Struggle for Israel and Palestine: An Analytic History and Reader (2011)
- Embracing the World, Hating Your Neighbors: Political Ethnicity in Asia and Europe 1200–1850 (Harvard University Press, forthcoming)
