= Mingyi Swe =

Mingyi Swe မင်းကြီးဆွေ Minye Thihathu I of Toungoo

Viceroy of Toungoo
- Reign: 1540–1549
- Predecessor: Mingyi Nyo
- Successor: Minkhaung II
- Born: c. 1490s Toungoo (Taungoo)
- Died: March 1549; Late Tagu/Kason 910 ME
- Spouse: Shin Myo Myat; Myo Myat's sister
- Issue: Dhamma Dewi; Bayinnaung; Minye Sithu; Thado Dhamma Yaza II; Minkhaung II; Thado Minsaw
- House: Toungoo
- Father: Taungkha Min
- Mother: Kayenawaddy
- Religion: Theravada Buddhism

Mingyi Swe (Burmese: မင်းကြီးဆွေ, pronounced [mɪ́ɴdʑí sʰwè]; officially styled as Minye Thihathu (မင်းရဲ သီဟသူ, [mɪ́ɴjɛ́ θìha̰θù]); and as Minye Theinkhathu (မင်းရဲ သိင်္ခသူ), Burmese pronunciation: [mɪ́ɴjɛ́ θèiɴga̰θù]; c. 1490s – 1549) was viceroy of Toungoo (Taungoo) from 1540 to 1549 during the reign of his son-in-law King Tabinshwehti of Toungoo dynasty. He was also the father of King Bayinnaung, as well as key viceroys in Bayinnaung's administration. He rose to the position of viceroy of the ancestral home of the dynasty, after having started out as a royal household servant of Tabinshwehti. All the Toungoo kings from Bayinnaung to Mahadhammaraza Dipadi descended from him.

== Background ==
The genealogy of Mingyi Swe and his first wife Shin Myo Myat (ရှင်မျိုးမြတ်), the parents of King Bayinnaung, is unclear. Though there are no extant contemporary records regarding Bayinnaung's ancestry or childhood, different traditions about the king's genealogy have persisted. According to Maha Yazawin, the official chronicle of Toungoo Dynasty compiled two centuries later, Swe was born to a gentry family in Toungoo (Taungoo), then a vassal state of Ava Kingdom. His parents were Taungkha Min (တောင်ခမင်း) and Kayenawaddy (ကရေနဝတီ), a descendant of viceroys of Toungoo, Tarabya (r. 1440–1446), and Minkhaung I (r. 1446–1451). When he reached adulthood, Swe was married to Myo Myat, a 5th generation descendant of King Thihathu of Pinya (r. 1310–1325) and his chief queen Mi Saw U of Pagan Dynasty.

Despite the official version of royal descent, oral traditions speak of a decidedly less grandiose genealogy: That the couple were commoners from Nga Tha York Provience Pagan district or Htihlaing village in Toungoo district, and that Swe was said to be a toddy palm Toddy Tree climber. The commoner origin story first gained prominence in the early 20th century during the British colonial period as nationalist writers promoted it as proof that even a son of a toddy tree climber could rise to become the great emperor like Bayinnaung in Burmese society. To be sure, the chronicle and oral traditions need not be mutually exclusive since being a toddy tree climber does not preclude his having royal ancestors. (Note: (Harvey 1925: 342): While "the family trees sported by men after they attain greatness must be suspect", Swe being "a toddy climber no more precludes the possibility of his having royal ancestors than it precluded his becoming vassal king of Toungoo when his son rose to greatness.")

== Royal household servant ==
Whatever their origin and station in life may have been, the couple's lives were changed for good in 1516 when both were chosen to be part of the seven-person staff to take care of the royal baby Tabinshwehti. His wife, who had delivered her second child named Ye Htut (ရဲထွတ်) just three months earlier, was chosen to be the wet nurse of the prince and heir apparent. The family moved into the Toungoo Palace precincts where the couple had three more sons, the last of whom died young. Myo Myat died in the 1520s, and Swe remarried to her younger sister, who bore him two more sons who later became known as Minkhaung II and Thado Minsaw. His youngest son was born in May 1531. (Note: (Zata 1960: 79): Thado Minsaw was born on Saturday, 5th waxing of Nayon 893 ME (20 May 1531).) They raised Tabinshwehti like a son of their own, and the prince in turn treated them like his own parents. The prince is said to have deeply respected Swe.

== Toungoo royalty ==
His close ties to the crown prince eventually brought him into the ranks of Toungoo royalty. When Tabinshwehti came to power in 1530, the 14-year-old king took Swe's eldest daughter Khin Hpone Soe as one of his two queens; awarded his father-in-law a royal title of Minye Theinkhathu (မင်းရဲ သိင်္ခသူ); and made him a key adviser. His royal ties became stronger in 1534 when his eldest son Ye Htut was married to Princess Thakin Gyi, younger half-sister of the king. In the next six years, whenever Tabinshwehti and Ye Htut (later styled as Bayinnaung Kyawhtin Nawrahta) went on military campaigns against the Hanthawaddy Kingdom, Swe was left to govern the capital, first Toungoo and later Pegu (Bago), with a sizable garrison.

In 1540, (Note: (Sein Lwin Lay 2006: 175): Chronicles only say he was appointed viceroy in 902 ME (29 March 1540 to 29 March 1541). But since he was already styled as Minye Thihathu at the start of the Martaban campaign in November 1540, the appointment took place between 29 March 1540 and November 1540.) Tabinshwehti appointed Swe viceroy of Toungoo with the style of Minye Thihathu (မင်းရဲ သီဟသူ). It was the first viceroyship appointment by the king, who had moved the capital of his kingdom to Pegu a year earlier. (Tabinshwehti also appointed another childhood servant Shin Nita to the viceroyship of Prome two years later.) Swe continued to be treated with great respect by the king in the following years. He was seated to the right of the king, a position normally reserved for the king's most trusted person, in the latter's 1545 coronation ceremony at Pegu. Swe built the Myazigon Pagoda at Toungoo in the same year.

Unlike his sons, he rarely went on military campaigns. Rather, his primary job during the king's annual military campaigns was to guard Toungoo from raids from eastern Shan states. He did join the king and his sons in the 1548–1549 invasion of Siam, commanding a regiment. He died in March 1549, within weeks of his return from the front. (Note: (Sein Lwin Lay 2006: 236): He died in 910 ME after having participated in the 1548–1549 Siamese campaign. Since Tabinshwehti arrived back at Pegu on 1 March 1549 (3rd waxing of Late Tagu 910 ME) per (Sein Lwin Lay 2006: 232), Mingyi Swe most probably died during the remaining weeks of 910 ME, which ended on 2nd waxing of Late Kason, 29 March 1549.)

== Bibliography ==
- Harvey, G. E. (1925). History of Burma: From the Earliest Times to 10 March 1824. London: Frank Cass & Co. Ltd.
- Royal Historians of Burma (1960) [c. 1680]. U Hla Tin (Hla Thamein) (ed.). Zatadawbon Yazawin (in Burmese). Historical Research Directorate of the Union of Burma.
- Royal Historical Commission of Burma (2003) [1832]. Hmannan Yazawin (in Burmese). Vol. 1–3. Yangon: Ministry of Information, Myanmar.
- Sein Lwin Lay, Kahtika U (2006) [1968]. Mintaya Shwe Hti and Bayinnaung: Ketumadi Taungoo Yazawin (in Burmese) (2nd printing ed.). Yangon: Yan Aung Sarpay.
- Thaw Kaung, U (2010). Aspects of Myanmar History and Culture. Yangon: Gangaw Myaing.

Mingyi Swe Toungoo dynasty Born: c. 1490s Died: March 1549
Royal titles
Preceded by Mingyi Nyo	Viceroy of Toungoo; 1540 – March 1549	Succeeded by Minkhaung II
