= The Legend of King Naresuan: The Series season 2 =

The Legend of King Naresuan: The Series
- Season 2
- Season 2 Thai poster
- Starring: Daweerit Chullasapya; Pacharawan Vadrukchit; Rachan Sharma; Nattarika Faodan; Aungoont Thanasapchroen; Raiwin Ratsaminiyomwut; Pacharanamon Nonthapa; Pattaravadee Laosa; Worachai Hirunlabh; Athiwat Theeranithitnanth
- No. of episodes: 5

Release
- Original network: MONO29

Season chronology
- ← Previous; Season 1 Next → Season 3

The Legend of King Naresuan: The Series - Reclaiming Sovereignty (Thai: ตำนานสมเด็จพระนเรศวรมหาราช เดอะซีรีส์ ภาคประกาศอิสรภาพ) is the second season of the MONO29 Thai Historical action series, The Legend of King Naresuan: The Series, which premiered on August 1, 2018 on MONOMAXX.COM. This season continues the story from Season 1 and focuses on "Prince Naresuan" journey to reclaim sovereignty, drawing inspiration from the second part of the film, King Naresuan.

== Cast and characters ==
=== Main cast ===
- Daweerit Chullasapya as Prince Naresuan
- Pacharawan Vadrukchit as Manechan
- Rachan Sharma as Rachamanu (Bunting) – Teenager
- Nattarika Faodan as Princess Lerkin
- Aungoont Thanasapchroen as Prince Minchit Sra
- Raiwin Ratsaminiyomwut as Princess Natshin Medaw
- Pacharanamon Nonthapa as Princess Supankulaya
- Pattaravadee Laosa as Princess Wilaikalaya
- Worachai Hirunlabh as Phra Chaiburi
- Athiwat Theeranithitnanth as Phra Srithamorrat

=== Recurring cast ===
- Pitchawut Piemtammaroj as Prince Ekathotsarot
- Atiwat Snitwong Na Ayutthaya as King Maha Thamaracha
- Siraprapha Sukdumrong as Queen Wisutkasat
- Patthamawan Kaomoolkadi as Princess Thep Kasattri
- Marttra Praihirun as King of Kang
- Krilash Kreangkrai as Phraya Dhamma
- Rungtiwa Kongsanun as Keanchan
- NongBew Kawkong as Saming
- Paramej Noi-Am as King Bayinnaung
- Kasab Champadib as King Nanda Bayin
- Nussara Prawanna as Queen Meng Pyu
- Suchao Pongwilai as Surakhamma
- Tanayonng Wongtrakul as Lord Luckwaitummoo
- Yutphichai Chanlekha as Phraya Kiet
- Bhasaworn Bawronkirati as Phraya Ram
- Kunakorn Kirdpan as King Barommaracha IV (Nak Phra Satra)
- Eak Thanakorn as King Thado Minsaw

== Episode ==
No. overall	No. in season	Title	Directed by	Written by	Original release date	TH viewers (millions)
13	1	"Pra Ya Longvek"	Chalermchatri Yukol	Chalermchatri Yukol & Vorrayut Phichaisorrathat	August 1, 2018	-
After Prince Narest (Thai: พระนเรศ) has fled to Phitsanulok Song Khwae. Many years ago, he has grown up. And became the viceroy of Phitsanulok Song Khwae, instead King Maha Thammarachathirat (Thai: สมเด็จพระมหาธรรมราชาธิราช) his father to dominate in Kingdom of Ayutthaya. Naresuan practiced daily martial arts. There are many brave soldiers around him, either Phra Rach Manu (Thai: พระราชมนู) the friend of King Naresuan since the time he was a Hongsawadee City (Thai: เมืองหงสาวดี), and had a Phra Sri Thammorrat (Thai: พระศรีถมอรัตน์) and Phra Chai Buri (Thai: พระชัยบุรี). King of Chai Buri City to have to live with Prince Ekothotsarot (Thai: พระเอกาทศรถ), His younger brother and Manechan are growing up too. The reputation of Prince Narest far to the Longvek (Thai: ละแวก) Nack Phra Satha (Thai: นักพระสัตถา) King of Longvek was not engaged. He send Chinese spies who dare that. "Phraya Chin Chantu" (Thai: พระยาจีนจันตุ), but Phraya Chin Chantu was arrested on suspicion of the Ayutthaya, He up on argosy to escape from Ayutthaya. Prince Naresuan led the navy to the arrest him until to navy battle. But the Phraya Chin Chantu to escape finish.
14	2	"Coronation"	Chalermchatri Yukol	Chalermchatri Yukol & Vorrayut Phichaisorrathat	August 1, 2018	N/A
In the year of 1581, King Bayinnaung (Thai: พระเจ้าบุเรงนอง) died. so Prince Nanda Bayin (Thai: พระเจ้านันบุเรง) reign continued from King Bayinnaung. He has sent deed to the king of Ayodhaya to send representatives to the royal funeral pyre. Prince Naresuan has proposed himself, despite knowing that. Will return to the enemy again. But because King Bayinnaung has obligation to Prince Naresuan like his real father, the other one, Prince Naresuan is required to travel. And knowing that this trip will find many dangers. So he went alone. Do not take Prince Ekathotsarot (Thai: สมเด็จพระเอกาทศรถ) with him. When he go to Hongsawadee city. Maha Upraja Mingyi Swa (Thai: พระมหาอุปราชามังกยอชวา) the son of King Nanda Bayin who disgusted Naresuan since he was young and his friend. They will do in everything to Naresuan meet the danger that will bring life. At this funeral. Kang, who is a colony of Hongsawadee, did not send a representative. King Nanda Bayin is commanded to the viceroy of the three cities, Prince Naresuan from Ayodhaya, Prince Natshinnaung (Thai: พระราชบุตรนัดจินหน่อง) of Toungoo, And Prince Mingyi Swa of Hongsawadee city. so they compete to raise the army to defeat Kang.
15	3	"Kang's War"	Chalermchatri Yukol	Chalermchatri Yukol & Vorrayut Phichaisorrathat	August 1, 2018	N/A
When they comes to Kang, it is a high mountain town. so difficult to attack Prince Mingyi Swa despite have the many troops attacked, which was not successful. It was heavily resisted by Princess Lerkin (Thai: องค์หญิงเลอขิ่น) Chao Fa Muang Kang(Thai: เจ้าฟ้าเมืองคัง)'s daughter. The next day, Toungoo's army decided to attack Kang City in night. The wooden shield was used, but was unsuccessful because it was attacked by fire. At the time Toungoo forces are attacking it. Prince Naresuan has surveyed the state around the city. At behind the city, there is a water source that the villagers use to scoop up the road to Kang. so Prince Naresuan command to divided the army into two ways to pretend to Phra Chai Buri. And as Sri Thaorrat counterfeit to attack like two cities before that (Hongsawadee and Toungoo). He will attack on the back, it appears that Naresuan was conquer Kang City. and can have to take Lerkin and King of Kang back to get a Hongsawadee city result. When Prince Naresuan accomplished that. get Prince Natshinnaung have to admit that in the future, Naresuan may be both friendly and important enemy. When to back at Hongsawadee city. King Nanda Bayin ordered to burn as the King of Kang. But Prince Naresuan asked his life. King Nanda Bayin then let go back. Later. King Nanda Bayin and King Thado Minsaw (Thai: พระเจ้าตะโดเมงสอ) conflict among themselves, because Maha Upraja Mingyi Swa took Princess Natshin Medaw's head to hit with the end of the bed until blood flowed. Princess Natshin Medaw (Thai: พระนางนัตชินเมดอ), sent a Blood lining fabric to King Thado Minsaw.
16	4	"Reclaiming Sovereignty"	Chalermchatri Yukol	Chalermchatri Yukol & Vorrayut Phichaisorrathat	August 1, 2018	N/A
King Thado Minsaw was very angry and declared war between Inwa and Hongsawadee city. While King Nanda Bayin went to war at Inwa Maha Upracha Mangyi Swa As the Hongsawadee's keeper made an assassination plot against Naresuan when he arrived in the Kreng city, but Phraya Kian (Thai: พระยาเกียรติ) and Phraya Ram (Thai: พระยาราม), the Mon soldiers who had been sent to assassinate Prince Naresuan, but they realized the suggestion from Mahathera Kunchong (Thai: พระมหาเถรคันฉ่อง),. That when Lord Bayinnuang died, he came to the temple outside the city. so they brought the word to Prince Naresuan. Prince Naresuan then "poured water on the earth from a gold goblet to proclaim to the devatas in the presence of the persons assembled, that from that day forth Siam had severed friendship with Hongsawadi and was no longer in amity as of yore.".
17	5	"Across The Sittaung River"	Chalermchatri Yukol	Chalermchatri Yukol & Vorrayut Phichaisorrathat	August 1, 2018	N/A
While Princess Lerkin returned to Kang Princess Lerkin decided to followed with the army of Prince Naresuan. to help their Shan people who were arrest by the Hongsawadee soldiers in Kamphaeng Phet city, with Mok Mu the mistress of the female guardian While Princess Lerkin and Mok Mu are traveling in the forest The assassin of the Naga required assassinated Prince Naresuan. Including the assassination of King Naresuan to his residence By the Maha Upracha Mingyi Swa Causing King Naresuan to start traveling faster to get out of the Hongsawadee boundary. Hongsawadee's army chased after King Naresuan more closely. Mok Mu to protect Princess Lerkin from danger. She killed herself for not to be a burden. Makes Princess Lerkin easier to bring news to the Prince Naresuan. While everyone is crossing the Sittaung River. Prince Naresuan ordered the Phra Rachamanu to help Maneechan and Princess Lerkin Kham Sittaung River. And he was able to cross the river successfully He also used the royal long gun, which he had received from Kreng city to shoot Suragamma (Thai: สุรกรรมา), from the elephant's neck to death
