= The Legend of King Naresuan: The Series season 3 =

The Legend of King Naresuan: The Series
- Season 3
- Starring: Daweerit Chullasapya; Pacharawan Vadrukchit; Rachan Sharma; Nattarika Faodan; Aungoont Thanasapchroen; Raiwin Ratsaminiyomwut; Pacharanamon Nonthapa; Pattaravadee Laosa; Worachai Hirunlabh; Athiwat Theeranithitnanth

Release
- Original network: MONO29

Season chronology
- ← Previous; Season 2

The Legend of King Naresuan: The Series - Damage War (Thai: ตำนานสมเด็จพระนเรศวรมหาราช เดอะซีรีส์ ภาคศึกล้างแผ่นดิน) or The Legend of King Naresuan: The Series - Ban Sraket Battle (Thai: ตำนานสมเด็จพระนเรศวรมหาราช เดอะซีรีส์ ภาคศึกบ้านสระเกศ) is the final season of the MONO29 Thai historical action series The Legend of King Naresuan: The Series. Season 3 focuses on Prince Naresuan during the battle at Ban Srakest (Thai: บ้านสระเกศ) between King Naresuan and Nawrahta Minsaw and the beginning of Nanda Bayin's War is based on the King Naresuan 3, 4 film.

== Cast and characters ==
=== Main cast ===
- Daweerit Chullasapya as Prince Naresuan
- Pacharawan Vadrukchit as Manechan
- Rachan Sharma as Rachamanu (Bunting) - Teenager
- Nattarika Faodan as Princess Lerkin
- Aungoont Thanasapchroen as Prince Minchit Sra
- Raiwin Ratsaminiyomwut as Princess Natshin Medaw
- Pacharanamon Nonthapa as Princess Supankulaya
- Pattaravadee Laosa as Princess Wilaikalaya
- Worachai Hirunlabh as Pra Chaiburi
- Athiwat Theeranithitnanth as Pra Srithamorrat

=== Recurring cast ===
- Atiwat Snitwong Na Ayutthaya as King Maha Thamaracha
- Kasarb Jumpadib as King Nanda Bayin
- Siraprapha Sukdumrong as Queen Wisutkasat
- Patthamawan Kaomoolkadi as Princess Thep Kasattri
- Krilash Kreangkrai as Pra Sunthornsongkram
- Nussara Prawanna as Queen Meng Pyu
- Tanayonng Wongtrakul as Lord Luckwaitummoo
- Rattanaballang Tohssawat as Prince Sri Suriyobhan

== Production ==
One of the most notable scenes is the battle between King Naresuan and Nawrahta Minsaw. In this scene, many actors portray soldiers. Pitchawut Piemthammaroj (Prince Ekathotsarot) did not appear in this scene because he was taking an exam to become an attorney. The director looked for a substitute actor to fill the role but was unable to find one.
