= Mo Hin Khao =

Coordinates: 16.064128°N 101.966454°E

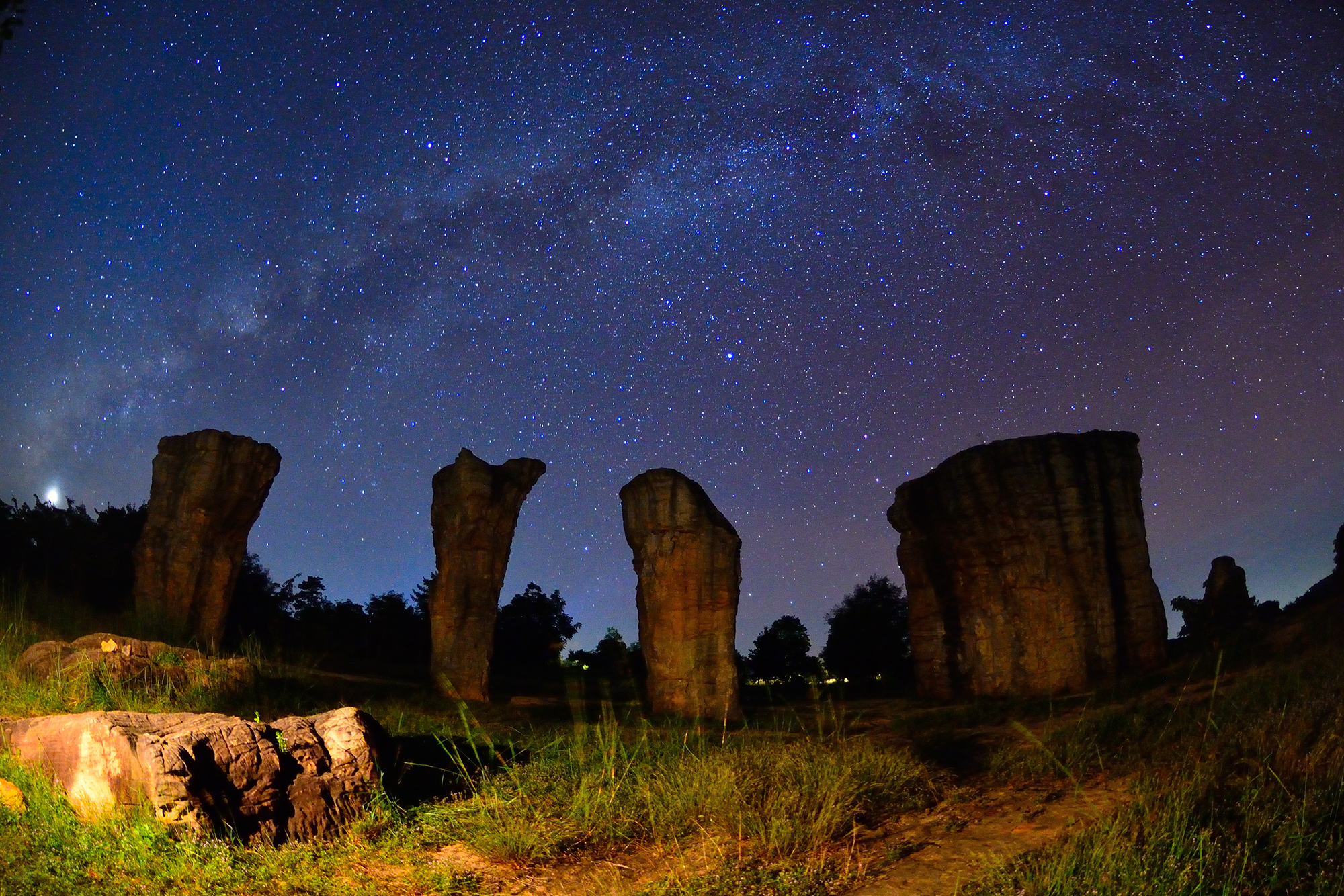
Mo Hin Khao pillar rock formation

Mo Hin Khao (Thai: มอหินขาว) is a white hill located in a broad field at Phu Laen Kha National Park, No.9, Tah Hin Ngom sub-district, Mueang District Chaiyaphum, Thailand. Mo Hin Khao is known as "the Stonehenge in Thailand".

== Formation of Mo Hin Khao ==
Its geological features and surroundings are made of sedimentary rocks in Jurassic – Cretaceous periods 195 – 65 million years. After plate tectonics, folds and fragmentation of rocks happened, including decay and erosion from rain for a long time until it formed into many shapes.

== Five Interesting places at Mo Hin Khao ==
In the area of Mo Hin Khao, there are five interested place where are exquisite and attractive – a group of pillar rocks, Pagoda stone Elephants stone, Lan Hin Ton Sai, The Million Years Stone Park, and Pah Hua Nak.

1. A group of pillar rocks, the first scenic point in Mo Hin Khao, consists of five remarkable pillar rocks with a strange structure. The rocks are around twelve meters tall. The five rocks which a white light would appear during Buddhist Sabbath nights (full moon, the 8th and 15th days of the waxing moon) that is the reason of the name of this place of Thailand which is called ”Mo Hin Khao”.
2. Pagoda stone Elephants stone, 650 meters from the first place, it consists of 50 - 80 peculiar rocks. Some tourists imagine these rocks are familiar to pagoda or elephants. Moreover, it is one of a good view to see sunrise.
3. Lan Hin Ton Sai, 900 meters from the first place, it consists of 50 – 60 rocks. Its surrounding has a lot of banyan trees.
4. The fourth place is The Million Years Stone Park, 1250 meters from the first place, it consists of rock field where the field has moisture all the year. The reason, it has many wild orchids and more flowers. Furthermore, this place is also the scenic view.
5. Pah Hua Nak is the highest scenic view of Mo Hin Khao which is 2500 meters from the first place, and 905 meters above mean sea level. It has a cool weather throughout the year and it also a good view to see sunset.

== Recognition of Mo Hin Khao ==
In 2006, Mo Hin Khao was also selected to be a film location of The Legend of King Naresuan which is the famous film in Thailand. In 2010, Mo Hin Khao was selected to be an advertiser for Tourism Authority of Thailand (TAT) by the presenter, Thongchai McIntyre, one of the famous singer in Thailand.
