= Pacharanamon Nonthapa =

Thai actress

- ศศิธร นนทภา (Sasitorn Nonthapa)
- Born: 20 December 1993 (age 32); Kalasin Province, Thailand
- Other names: Eiw
- Occupation: Actress
- Years active: 2013–present
- Agent: MONO29
- Notable work: Princess Suphankanlaya from The Legend of King Naresuan: The Series

Pacharanamon Nonthapa (Thai: พชรณมน นนทภา, RTGS: Phacharanamon Nonthapha; born 20 December 1993), nicknamed Eiw (Thai: อิ๋ว), is a Thai television actress. He is best known for her lead roles acting in the series The Legend of King Naresuan: The Series (2016) and was part of Thai Girl Group The Glass Girls between 2019 and 2022

== Biography ==
She started working in the entertainment industry during her studies at Srinakharinwirot University During the Freshman, which was the Miss Gossip Girl 2012, and second place was awarded the opportunity to sign a contract with the MONO. Then began to take picture on a magazine. And a scout host. And later, she played the role in Thai series, The Legendary Outlaw as Tan Sai (Thai: ธารใส), and Princess Suphankanlaya in Thai historical action series. The Legend of King Naresuan: The Series

== Filmography ==
=== Film ===
- Hor Taew Tak 5

=== Television series ===
Year	Title	Role	Notes
2016	The Angels		Guest: Episode 5
2017	The Legendary Outlaw	Tan Sai	Main role: 7 Episodes
2017	The Legend of King Naresuan: The Series SS1	Princess Suphankanlaya	Main role
2018	The Legendary Outlaw 2	Tan Sai	Guest
2018	The Legend of King Naresuan: The Series SS2	Princess Suphankanlaya	Main role
2019	The Legend of King Naresuan: The Series SS 3	Princess Suphankanlaya	Main role

=== Music video ===
- Kod Lew Nai Duang Jai perform by Takkatan Chonlada
