= Daweerit Chullasapya =

Thai actor (born 1983)

- ทวีฤทธิ์ จุลละทรัพย์
- Born: August 19, 1983 (age 42); Bangkok, Thailand
- Other name: Pae
- Years active: 2010-present

Daweerit Chullasapya (Thai: ทวีฤทธิ์ จุลละทรัพย์, RTGS: Thawirit Chunlasap; born August 19, 1983) is a Thai actor. He is best known for his role as Sao Kya Seng in the 2015 american drama film, Twilight Over Burma (Thai: สิ้นแสงฉาน). In 2017–present, he has presented in lead role as the second great king of Siam King Naresuan in part two of The Legend of King Naresuan: The Series.

== Filmography ==
=== Film ===
Year	English title	Thai title	Role	Notes
2010	Kapi	กะปิ ลิงจ๋อไ่ม่หลอกจ้าว	Kant	
2015	Twilight Over Burma	สิ้นแสงฉาน	Sao Kya Seng	

=== Television dramas ===
Year	English title	Thai title	Role	Notes
2012	Mam Kam Deng	แหม่มแก้มแดง	Napatr	
2014	Ruean Ritsaya	เรือนริษยา	Kripatr	
2015	Bang Rajan	บางระจัน	Jeid (Uoo-Tin)	
2015	Suparp Burud Satan	สุภาพบุรุษซาตาน	Dr.Kongphop	
2016		สาวน้อยคาเฟ่	Saharat	
2016	Nha Gak Nang Aek	หน้ากากนางเอก	Taen Tai/ Taen	
2016	Kam lai Mass	กำไลมาศ	Prince Attharatna Tinachati	
2016	Pleng Naree	เพลิงนรี	Khisaj	
2017	The Legend of King Naresuan: The Series - Reclaiming Sovereignty	ตำนานสมเด็จพระนเรศวรมหาราช เดอะซีรีส์ ภาคประกาศอิสรภาพ	King Naresuan	Main Role
2018	The Legend of King Naresuan: The Series - Ban Sraket Battle	ตำนานสมเด็จพระนเรศวรมหาราช เดอะซีรีส์ ภาคศึกบ้านสระเกศ	King Naresuan	Main Role
TBA	The Legend of King Naresuan: The Series - The Nanda Bayin's War	ตำนานสมเด็จพระนเรศวรมหาราช เดอะซีรีส์ ภาคศึกนันทบุเรง	King Naresuan	Main Role
2018	Duay Raeng Atitharn (2018)	ด้วยแรงอธิษฐาน		Guest
2018	Khun Prab Darb Kham Pope (2018)	ขุนปราบดาบข้ามภพ	Kit	Guest
2019	Kham Tob Samrab Sawan	คำตอบสำหรับสวรรค์		
2020	Woon Ruk Nakkao	วุ่นรักนักข่าว	Manot Phonlapat	
2020	Plerng Nang	เพลิงนาง	Manoon Rati-teeradech (Noon)	
2021	Phaet Sa Ya	แพศยา	Man	Guest
2022	Mongkut Karma	มงกุฎกรรม	Dr.Pongsakorn Pisutthanakorn (Pong)	
2023	Mungkorn Lhong Ngao	หลงเงา	Suriyan ()	Guest
202?		มือปราบกระทะรั่ว		

=== Television series ===
- 2015 Wifi Society (ไวไฟ โซไซตี้) (GMM Grammy-GMMTV/One 31) as Ken (เคน) (Guest)
- 2016 Sot Story Season 1 () (Exact as Kin (คิน)
- 2016 Diary of Tootsies (ไดอารีตุ๊ดซีส์ เดอะซีรีส์) (GDH 559-Parbdee Tawesuk-Jor Kwang Films/GMM 25) as ChampPae, Champagne (แชมป์เป้ / แชมเปญ) (Guest in season 2)
- 2018 Club Friday The Series 9 (Club Friday the Series 9 รักครั้งหนึ่ง ที่ไม่ถึงตาย ตอน รักที่ไม่มีจริง) (A Time Media/GMM 25) as Ak (เอก) with Rhatha Phongam
- 2019 Wolf (Wolf เกมล่าเธอ) (GMMTV/One 31) as Robert (โรเบิร์ต) (Guest)
- 2019 Nobody Happy (2019) (Nobody's Happy ข่าวร้ายให้รัก) (Trasher, Bangkok/Facebook-YouTube-Line TV) as Maitree (ไมตรี)
- 2019 Instinct (2019) (Instinct ซ่อน ล่า หน้าสัตว์) (Kantana/LINE TV) as Ben (เบน)
- 2021 Bangkok Breaking (Bangkok Breaking มหานครเมือง(ห)ลวง) (/Netflix) as Jo (Wanchai's brother) (โจ้)
- 2021 Not Me (Not Me เขา...ไม่ใช่ผม) (GMMTV/GMM 25) as Tawi Kuerkulsvasti ()
- 2023 Midnight Motel Aep Lap Rongraem Rak (Midnight Motel แอปลับ โรงแรมรัก) (GMMTV/GMM 25) as Jay ()
- 2023 (The Interns หมอมือใหม่) (Bear In Mind Studios/Thai PBS) as Dr.Taiphob Dechanuwatchara (นพ.ไตรภพ เดชานุวัชร)

=== Television sitcoms ===
- 2016 Suea Chanee Keng (เสือ ชะนี เก้ง ตอน) (The One Enterprise/One 31) as Chai () (Guest)

=== Music video appearance ===
- 2011 Yahk Hai Roo ...(Kid Teung Tur Ka Nard Nai) (อยากให้รู้ (คิดถึงเธอขนาดไหน)) - Auttapon Prakopkong (We Records/YouTube:Musicwerecordsgmm)
