= Pattaravadee Laosa =

Thai actress

Pattarawadee Laosa
- ภัทรวดี เหลาสา
- Born: 15 September 1998 (age 27); Bangkok, Thailand
- Other name: Tungpang
- Occupation: Actress
- Years active: 2013–present
- Agent: MONO29
- Notable work: Princess Wilaikalaya from The Legend of King Naresuan: The Series

Pattarawadee Laosa (Thai: ภัทรวดี เหลาสา, born September 15 , 1998), nicknamed Tungpang (Thai: ถุงแป้ง), is a Thai television actress. She is best known for her lead roles acting in the series The Legend of King Naresuan: The Series (2016)

== Biography ==
Pattarawadee was born on September 16, 1998, in Bangkok, Thailand, She started her career in the Year 3 by scouting for various jobs. Then came the contest to hunt for new gangs. She also played the series BeeTalk (BeeTalk), as well as sitcoms. Nong Mai Rai Borisuth (Thai: น้องใหม่ร้ายบริสุทธิ์) and then have a fashion shoot. Show short films come on. Until she came into the company. Mono's Got Talent because she won in 2014 Gossip Girl contest. She sign with Mono for 2 years until he had the opportunity to join the casting and play in The Legend of King Naresuan: The Series And now she started to sing seriously. And it was talked to the productions to make music with the mono 29 company.

== Film ==
- Sweet Secret (2021) as Yogurt

== Television series ==
| Year | Title | Role | Notes |
|---|---|---|---|
| 2013-2014 | Nong Mai Rai Borisuth | | Supporting role |
| 2017 | The Legend of King Naresuan: The Series SS1 | Princess Wilaikanlaya | Main role |
| 2018 | The Legend of King Naresuan: The Series SS2 | Princess Wilaikanlaya | Main role |
| 2018 | Bangkok Vampire | Mu | Filming |
| 2019 | The Legend of King Naresuan: The Series SS3 | Princess Wilaikanlaya | Main role |
| 2026 | Heart Code | Thara Krahan | Main role |

== Music video ==
- Huo Jai Mai Pid Nha Thang (Thai: หัวใจไม่ปิดหน้าต่าง) (2561)
