= Ratchanon Ruenpech =

Thai singer, rapper, and actor (born 1996)

Ratchanon Ruenpech รัชชานนท์ เรือนเพ็ชร์
- Also known as: Shotgun (ช็อตกัน)
- Born: Ratchanon Ruenpech; 2 November 1996 (age 29); Bangkok, Thailand
- Genres: T-pop; pop; hip-hop
- Occupations: Singer; rapper; actor
- Instruments: Vocals; guitar; piano
- Years active: 2013–present
- Labels: Mono Music (2013–2020); Brothers Music (2021–present)
- Member of: Proxie, KimGun
- Formerly of: Evo Nine

Ratchanon Ruenpech (Thai: รัชชานนท์ เรือนเพ็ชร์; born 2 November 1996), nicknamed Gun (Thai: กัน), is a Thai singer, rapper, and actor. He is the eldest member and leader of the boy band Proxie.

Gun debuted in 2013 as a member of Mono Music's boy band Evo Nine and went on to appear in several television dramas on Mono 29, including The Legendary Outlaw (2016), Project X (2016), and Diamond Eyes (2017–19). He launched a solo music career with the singles "สวนกัน" (Suan Gun, 2018) and "BURN" (2019), and won the Rookie Male Star award at the Maya Awards in 2016.

In 2021 he was selected as leader of the boy band Proxie, formed through the television programme The Brothers Thailand; the group debuted in 2022. He has since formed the sub-unit KimGun with fellow member Kim and continued to release solo work, including OSTs for Channel 3 dramas.

== Early life and education ==
Also known by the nickname "Shotgun" (ช็อตกัน), Ratchanon grew up in Bangkok and attended Saint John's School before enrolling at the University of the Thai Chamber of Commerce, where he graduated with a B.A. in Airline Business Management. At the age of eight he won the team category of the national "Sing – Play – Dance – Show" (ร้อง เล่น เต้น โชว์) contest for the HRH Princess Sirindhorn Cup in 2005.

== Career ==
=== Evo Nine (2013–2014) ===
After three years of daily vocal and dance training at Mono Music, Gun debuted in 2013 as a vocalist-rapper in the seven-member boy band Evo Nine. The group's debut single "Make You Dance" was followed by "Superman", "The Other" (featuring Candy Mafia) and "BATMAN", all distributed on iTunes and streaming platforms. Evo Nine disbanded around 2014.

=== Acting and solo releases (2014–2019) ===
Gun began acting in 2014 with a lead role in Sunshine My Friend (อรุณสวัสดิ์), playing the character Phasu on Mono 29. He went on to take roles in The Legendary Outlaw (ตี๋ใหญ่ ดับ ดาว โจร, 2016) as "Siren", Petchakat Taphet (The Killer), Project X (แฟ้มลับเกมสยอง, 2016) as "Joe", and The Legend of King Naresuan: The Series (2017) as Prince Ekathotsarot. From 2017 to 2019 he portrayed "Shin" in the supernatural thriller Diamond Eyes across two seasons on Mono 29.

In August 2016 he won the "Rookie Male Star – Popular Vote" (ดาวรุ่งชาย ขวัญใจมหาชน) at the Maya Awards for his work in The Legendary Outlaw.

Gun resumed music as a soloist in 2018 with the dance-pop single "สวนกัน" (Suan Gun, "Walk Past"), for which he wrote the English rap section himself. His follow-up single "BURN" was released in 2019 under Mono Music's Pitch Music project.

In December 2019 he appeared as a mystery singer on the variety show I Can See Your Voice Thailand (Workpoint TV), performing alongside Trinity.

=== Proxie (2021–present) ===
Gun auditioned for The Brothers Thailand, a televised talent-search programme founded by actor Jesdaporn Pholdee, and after an extended training period was named leader of the six-member boy band Proxie. Proxie debuted on 28 April 2022 with the digital single "Crazy Love". Their second single "Silent Mode" (คนไม่คุย) reached number one on TikTok Thailand.

Proxie released further singles in 2024–2025, among them "Traffic" and "Bad Shawty"; the latter won Viral Song of the Year at the TikTok Awards Thailand 2025. The group's second album Level Up was released on 10 December 2024.

The group has held three concerts: "Access" at Thunder Dome (13 August 2023), "The Final Fantasy" at Impact Arena (16 November 2024), and "Proxima-B" at Impact Arena (24 January 2026). Proxie received "Best Boy Band of the Year" at the Guitar Mag Awards 2024 and have appeared at international music events, including 88rising and Levi's Road to FAM in Bangkok in July 2025. In 2026 Proxie continued releasing singles, including "Don't Rush!" (ไม่รีบงับป๋ม) and the OST "Someday, Say Yes" (จีบไม่จบ) for the BL drama Duang with You.

Gun has continued parallel solo work. His ballad "คนเดียวในหัวใจ" (The Only One), theme for Channel 3's drama The Invincible (มือปราบมหาอุตม์), was released in 2024. He later recorded a duet with Aheye of 4EVE on "Until the Sun Meets the Star", released 14 February 2025 as the OST for the Channel 3 drama Until the Sun Meets the Star (เมื่อตะวันลับฟ้าก็จะเป็นเวลาของดวงดาว).

==== KimGun sub-unit ====
In 2025, Gun and fellow member Kim formed the sub-unit KimGun. Their debut single "Pretty Girl" was released in 2025, followed by "Tell Me" (สรุปเอาไง), which premiered live at the Proxima-B concert before its official MV release on 5 March 2026.

=== Musical style ===
Gun's music blends melodic pop singing with rap sections, and he plays guitar and piano. He has described varying his vocal ad-libs and improvisations between live performances.

== Discography ==
=== Solo singles ===
Year	Title	Label	Notes	Ref.
2018	"สวนกัน" (Suan Gun / "Walk Past")	Mono Music		
2019	"Burn"	Mono Music (Pitch Music)		
2024	"คนเดียวในหัวใจ" (The Only One)	—	The Invincible OST	
2025	"Until the Sun Meets the Star" (with Aheye, 4EVE)	—	Until the Sun Meets the Star OST	

=== With KimGun ===
Year	Title	Label	Ref
2025	"Pretty Girl"	Brothers Music	
2026	"Tell Me" (สรุปเอาไง)	Brothers Music	

== Television ==
Year	Title	Role	Network	Ref.
2014–15	Sunshine My Friend (อรุณสวัสดิ์)	Pasu (ภาสุ)	Mono 29	
2016	The Legendary Outlaw (ตี๋ใหญ่ ดับ ดาว โจร)	Siren	Mono 29	
2016	Petchakat Taphet (The Killer)	—	Mono 29	
2016	Project X (แฟ้มลับเกมสยอง)	Joe (โจ)	Mono 29	
2017–19	Diamond Eyes (ตาสัมผัสผี, S1–2)	Shin (ชิน)	Mono 29	
2017	The Legend of King Naresuan: The Series	Prince Ekathotsarot	Mono 29	
2019	I Can See Your Voice Thailand	Himself (mystery singer)	Workpoint TV	
2026	Duang with You	Tiw	One 31	

== Awards and nominations ==
Year	Award	Category	Result	Ref.
2016	Maya Awards	Rookie Male Star – Popular Vote (ดาวรุ่งชาย ขวัญใจมหาชน)	Won	
