= Inwa Mibaya =

Inwa Mibaya အင်းဝ မိဖုရား

Queen consort of Ava
- Reign: 19 February 1555 – 24 April [O.S. 14 April] 1584
- Born: c. December 1534 c. Pyatho 896 ME; Toungoo (Taungoo)
- Died: January 1595 (aged 60); Tabodwe 956 ME; Pegu (Bago)
- Spouse: Thado Minsaw of Ava
- Issue: Natshin Medaw
- House: Toungoo
- Father: Bayinnaung
- Mother: Atula Thiri
- Religion: Theravada Buddhism

Inwa Mibaya (Note: Inwa Mibaya means Queen of Ava. Her birth name is not mentioned in the chronicles.) (Burmese: အင်းဝ မိဖုရား, pronounced [ʔɪ́ɴwa̰ mḭbəjá]; (Note: Modern spelling and pronunciation given. The chronicles use the archaic spelling အဝ မိဖုရား based on the Upper Burmese pronunciation of [ʔəwa̰ mḭbəjá].) c. 1534–1595) was the chief queen consort of Ava from 1555 to 1584. She was the eldest child of King Bayinnaung and his chief queen Atula Thiri Maha Yaza Dewi of Toungoo Dynasty of Burma (Myanmar). At age 20, she was married off to Bayinnaung's younger half-brother Thado Minsaw, at the latter's coronation ceremony as viceroy of Ava on 19 February 1555. (Note: (Hmannan Vol. 2 2003: 295): Tuesday, 12th waning of Tabodwe 916 ME = 19 February 1555) The couple had a daughter, Natshin Medaw.

The Burmese chronicles name her as an instigator for her husband's 1583 rebellion against her younger brother, King Nanda. But Nanda held no grudge toward his elder sister. After he put down Thado Minsaw's rebellion in April 1584, he put her up at a mansion at Pegu, replete with her retinue. In mid-1587, Natshin Medaw joined her at her residence after her daughter was divorced by Mingyi Swa. The dowager queen peacefully lived out her last years with her daughter, and died in January 1595, at age 60. (Note: (Maha Yazawin Vol. 3 2006: 95): Tabodwe 956 ME = 10 January 1595 to 8 February 1595 NS) She was given a royal cremation ceremony by her brother.

== In popular culture ==
She was a character in the 1987 Thai television drama, The Legend of King Naresuan (ละครสมเด็จพระนเรศวรมหาราช ปี 2530) as a daughter of king Bayinnaung.

== Ancestry ==
Ancestry of Inwa Mibaya

8. Taungkha Min
4. Mingyi Swe
9. Kayenawaddy
2. Bayinnaung
10. Kywesit Min
5. Shin Myo Myat
11. <unnamed>
1. Inwa Mibaya
12. Maha Thinkhaya
6. Mingyi Nyo
13. Min Hla Nyet
3. Atula Thiri
14. Saopha of Mobye
7. Yadana Dewi
15. <unnamed>

== Bibliography ==
- Kala, U (1724). Maha Yazawin (in Burmese). Vol. 1–3 (2006, 4th printing ed.). Yangon: Ya-Pyei Publishing.
- Royal Historical Commission of Burma (1832). Hmannan Yazawin (in Burmese). Vol. 1–3 (2003 ed.). Yangon: Ministry of Information, Myanmar.

Inwa Mibaya Toungoo Dynasty Born: December 1534 Died: January 1595
Regnal titles
Preceded by	Queen consort of Ava; 19 February 1555 – 24 April 1584	Succeeded by
