= Suphankanlaya =

- Princess of Ayutthaya
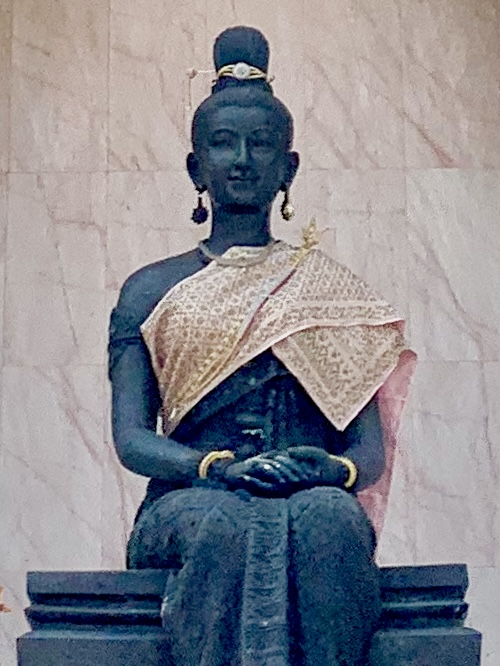
- Statue of Suphankanlaya at Wat Chan Tawan-ok, Phitsanulok Province

Consort of the Burmese monarch
- Tenure: 22 January 1567 – 10 October 1581
- Born: in or before 1554; Phitsanulok
- Died: Unknown; Unknown
- Spouse: Bayinnaung
- Issue: Min A Htwe
- House: Sukhothai
- Father: Maha Thammarachathirat
- Mother: Wisutkasat
- Religion: Theravada Buddhism

Suphankanlaya (Thai: สุพรรณกัลยา, Suvarṇakalyā; Burmese: ဗြဣန္ဒဒေဝီ) was a 16th-century Siamese princess who, according to later chronicles and popular tradition, became a consort of King Bayinnaung of the Toungoo dynasty in Burma. Historical records about her life are scarce, but her story has become widespread in Thailand, where she is regarded by many as a national heroine and venerated in popular religious beliefs.

== Biography and legend ==
She was the daughter of Maha Thammaracha, viceroy of Phitsanulok and later King of Ayutthaya and his wife Wisutkasat; elder sister of the princes Naresuan and Ekathotsarot who later both became kings of Ayutthaya, too. On her maternal side she was a granddaughter of King Chakkraphat and Queen Suriyothai. In 1564, her father became a vassal of King Bayinnaung of Pegu in Burma. Her brothers were taken to the Peguan court to serve as pages and guarantee for the loyalty of their father, as was usual at the time.

=== Thai narrative ===
According to the common narrative in Thailand, in 1571, Suphankanlaya agreed to marry Bayinnaung to become one of his minor wives. This bond, too, should consolidate her father's allegiance to the Burmese king. Her brothers, instead, could return home. She had two children with Bayinnaung. After the king's death in 1581, she became the wife of his son and successor Nanda. In 1584, her father revolted against Nanda. He revoked the oath of allegiance to the Burmese king and it came to war. After her father's death in 1590, her brother Naresuan carried on the fight. In 1593, Naresuan defeated and killed Nanda's son Mingyi Swa in a legendary duel on elephants' backs. When Nanda learnt of his son's death, according to the common narrative in Thailand, he became enraged and struck Suphankanlaya, who was eight months pregnant with his child, dead.

=== Burmese records ===
The Burmese chronicles mention her only in passing. According to the records, her title was Bra Inda Devi or Phra Indra Devi (ဗြဣန္ဒဒေဝီ, [pʰjá ʔèiɴdɹà dèwì]) (Note: Modern Burmese pronunciation given here. The name "ဗြဣန္ဒဒေဝီ" is an archaic Mon language-derived Burmese version of Thai "Phra Intha Thewi" (Pali: "Vara Inda Devī"; Sanskrit: "Vara Indra Devī"). Per (Pan Hla 2004: 176), the spelling ဣန္ဒ is of Mon origin, and means Sakra (Inda/Indra), the ruler of the Tāvatiṃsa Heaven in Buddhist cosmology. Her title means Her Highness Royal Queen Consort of Sakra, and may be translated as "အိန္ဒြာဒေဝီ မိဖုရား" (Eindra Dewi Mibaya, [ʔèiɴdɹà dèwì mḭbəjá]) in modern Burmese.) and her personal name was Amyoyon (အမျိုးရုံ, [ʔə mjó jòʊɴ]). She was presented to the king at the Pegu court on 22 January 1567. They had a daughter named Min A-Htwe (မင်းအထွေး, [mɪ́ɴ ʔə tʰwé]). Moreover, the chronicles make no mention of her subsequent marriage to Nanda. Her name does not appear in the chronicles' list of queens, junior queens or concubines of Nanda.

== Popular cult ==
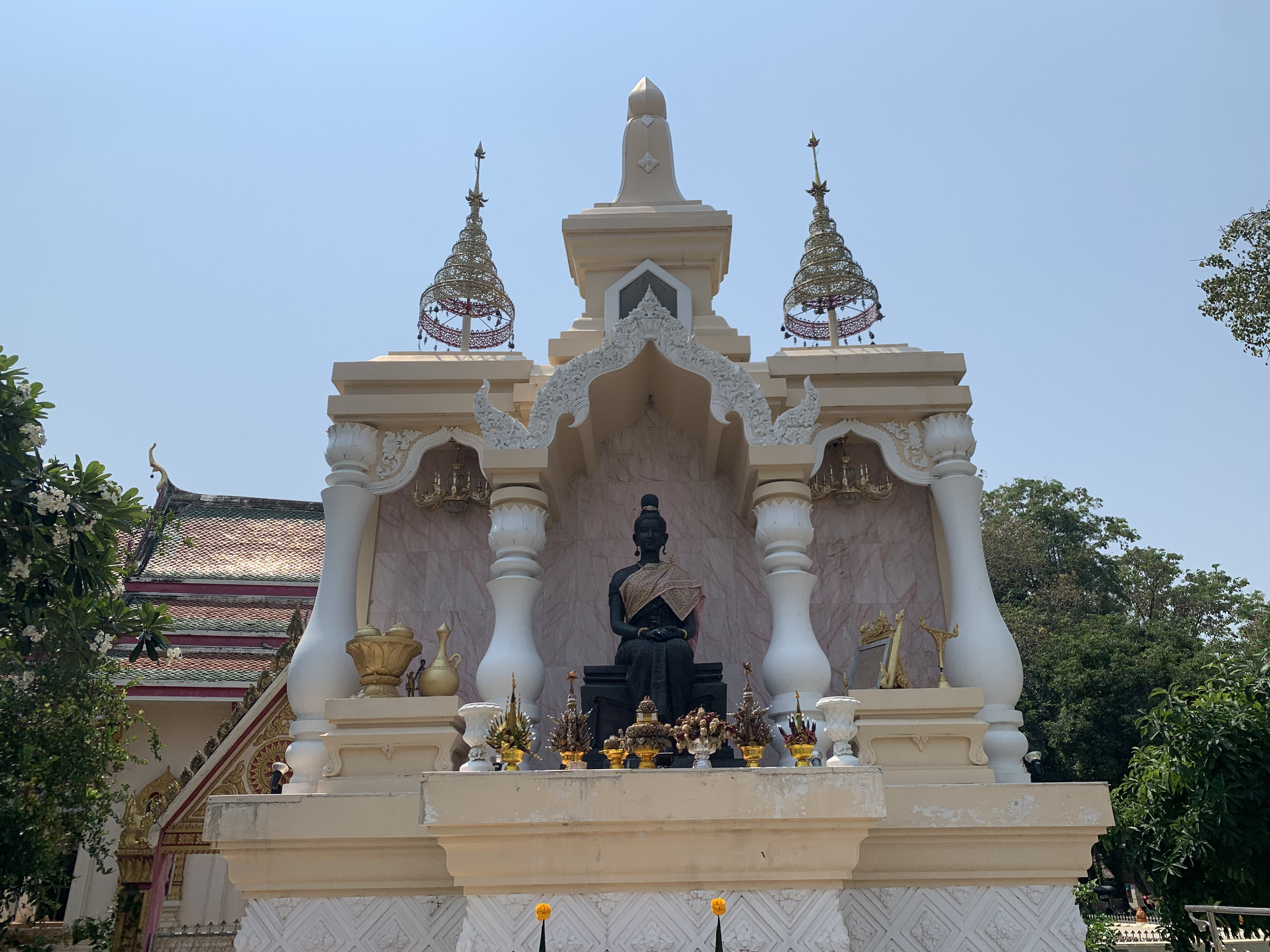
Shrine to Suphankanlaya at Wat Chan Tawan-ok, Phitsanulok

In official accounts of the Siamese and Burmese history, Suphankanlaya is only mentioned in passing, if at all. However, her story entered the Thai national mythology. Legends of her have often been depicted in popular culture. During and after the 1997 Asian financial crisis, she became part of the "pantheon" of Thai national deities. A businesswoman first claimed that Suphankanlaya had saved her from bankruptcy. She then asked a historian to research the chronicles for accounts of the princess and a successful romantic novelist to popularise Suphankanlaya's story in an easy-to-read way. The historian insisted that historic depictions of the princess are very sparse and the story of her gruesome death rather legend than historically traceable. This did not stop large parts of the Thai public from developing a cult around the supposed heroine, worshipping her images and votive objects. As no authentic portrayal of the historic person has survived, the pictures were modelled on the look of former beauty queens.

Suphankanlaya, like her brother Naresuan, was established as a symbol of national assertiveness and self-sacrifice. In Thai folk beliefs, the spirits of murder victims are attributed exceptional powers. The spread of Suphankanlaya worship has to be seen in the context of the rise of Thai nationalist (particularly anti-Burmese) sentiments at that time of economic crisis. It is similar to the emergence of a cult around her grandmother Queen Suriyothai who is (ahistorically) venerated as a strong warrior heroine who sacrificed herself for the sovereignty of the nation, as well. The popular reverence for Suphankanlaya was seized on by Thai authorities and the military. The Third Army command in her presumed native city of Phitsanulok was the first to erect a monument to her and commissioned a biography in 1998, in which the alleged cruelty of her Burmese husband was emphasised. In 2004, a film was made of her legend.

== In popular culture ==
- Portrayed by Rattanaporn Inthornkamhaeng in the 1957 Thai film Naresuan Maharat
- Portrayed by Ratchanu Boonchuduang in the 1987 CH3 TV drama Somdet Phra Naresuan Maharat
- Portrayed by Warattaya Nilkuha in the 2003 and 2004 RTA5 TV drama Kassatriya and Maharaj Koo Pandin
- Portrayed by Jirakitiya Boonkrongsupya in the 2004 Thai film Suphankallaya
- Portrayed by Grace Mahadumrongkul in the 2007 -2015 Thai film The Legend of King Naresuan
- Portrayed by Pacharanamon Nonthapa in the 2017 -2019 Mono29 TV series The Legend of King Naresuan: The Series
- Portrayed by Cherprang Areekul in the 2025 CH3HD TV drama Jom Jai Ayodhya
- Portrayed by Wannarot Sonthichai in the 2026 one31 TV series The Last Duel

== Literature ==
- U Kala (1724). Maha Yazawin (in Burmese). Vol. 1–3 (2006, 4th printing ed.). Yangon: Ya-Pyei Publishing.
- Nai Pan Hla (1968). Razadarit Ayedawbon (in Burmese) (8th printing, 2004 ed.). Yangon: Armanthit Sarpay.
- Royal Historical Commission of Burma (1832). Hmannan Yazawin (in Burmese). Vol. 1–3 (2003 ed.). Yangon: Ministry of Information, Myanmar.
- Sunait Chutintaranond (1999), พระสุพรรณกัลยา จากตำนานสู่หน้าประวัติศาสตร์ [Phra Suphankanlaya: Chak Tamnan su na Prawattisat / Princess Suphankalaya: From Legend to History]
- Jim Taylor (2001), "History, Simulacrum and the real: the making of a Thai princess", From Fact to Fiction: History of Thai-Myanmar Relations in Cultural Context, Institute of Asian Studies, Chulalongkorn University, pp. 1–16
