= Proxie =

Thai boy band

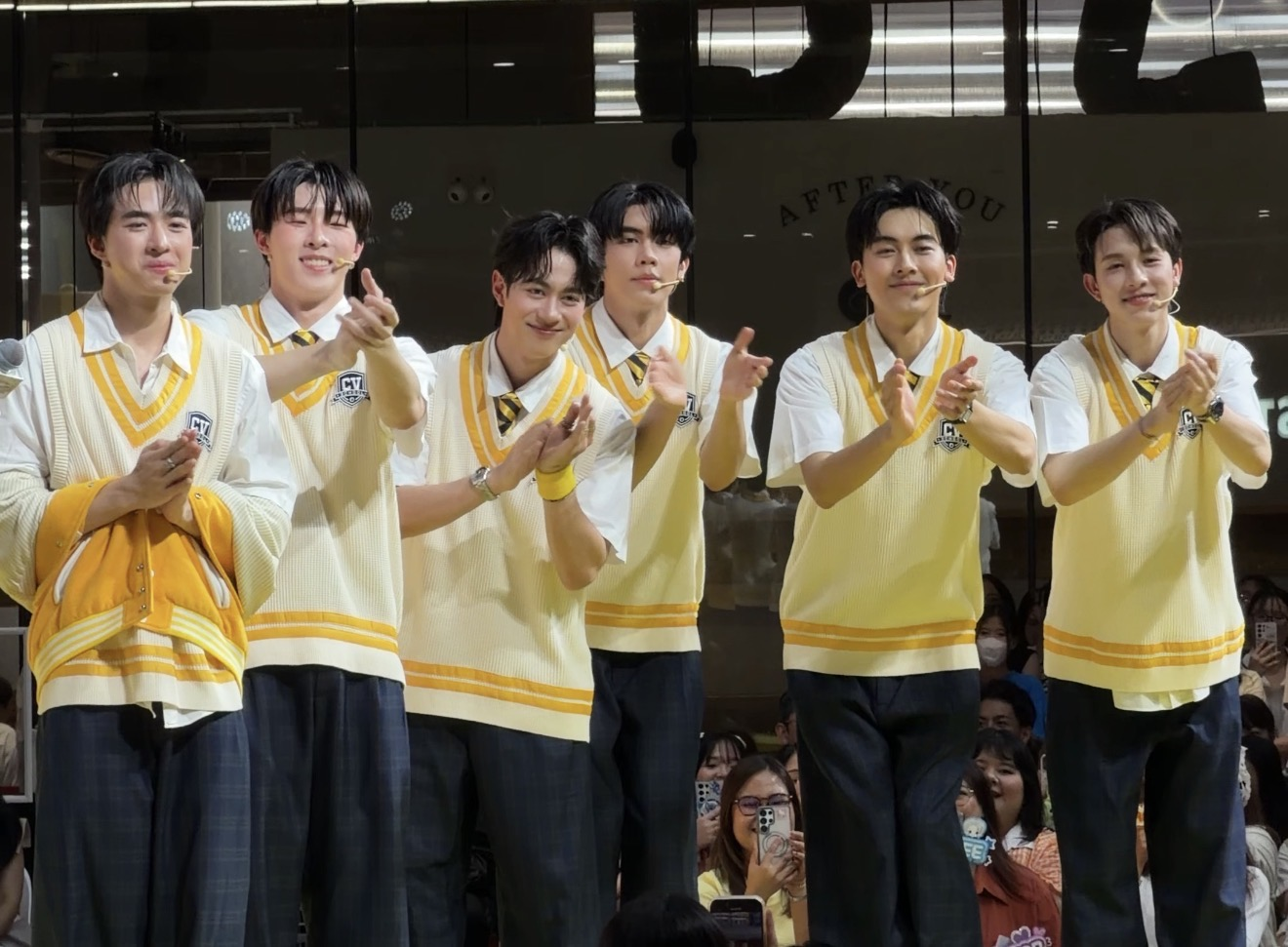
- Proxie in September 2025; From left to right: Victor, Kim, Gun, Chokun, Gorn, and Onglee

Background information
- Origin: Bangkok, Thailand
- Genres: T-pop; Pop; Dance-pop; Dance; R&B; Synth-pop
- Years active: 2022–present
- Label: Brothers Music
- Members: Ratchanon Ruenpech; Pannathorn Jirasart; Pavaris Srichaichana; Gorn Wannapairote; Oscar Edward Wattraserte; Vorameth Kornubrabhan

Proxie (Thai: พร็อกซี, RTGS: Phroksi; stylized in all caps as PROXIE) is a Thai boy band and the first group under Brothers Music, managed by Dreamers Society Management. The group consists of six members from the program The Brothers Thailand: Gun, Kim, Chokun, Gorn, Onglee, and Victor.

The group was created by actor Jesdaporn Pholdee and debuted with the single "Crazy Love (รักบ้าบอ)" on 28 April 2022. In August of the same year, they released their second single "Silent Mode (คนไม่คุย)", which went viral on TikTok Thailand and reached millions of views.

The group has released two studio albums, Data Storage and Level Up.

== History ==
=== Debut ===
The group officially debuted with "Crazy Love" in April 2022, produced by Narongsak Sribandhasakwatcharagon with lyrics by Thanee Wongniwatkajorn. Their debut showcase was held at the event Proxie The Debut Stage, at Siam Square One in Bangkok.

=== Breakthrough ===
The second single, "Silent Mode", reached number one on TikTok Thailand. In November 2022, they released "Unnoticed (ที่ไม่รัก)", followed by "Blurrr" in April 2023; rapper Milli appeared in the latter's music video.

In August 2023, they released their first full-length album Data Storage, which included additional tracks such as "Hurting", "Stop!" and "ชน (Crush)". On 10 December 2024, the group announced its second studio album, Level Up, which was released in 2025.

In 2025, Proxie introduced two sub-units: VOC, consisting of Victor, Onglee and Chokun, and KIMGUN, consisting of Kim and Gun.

=== Headline concerts ===
On 13 August 2023, Proxie held its first headline concert, ACCESS, at Thunder Dome. Their second, The Final Fantasy, was held at Impact Arena on 16 November 2024, followed by PROXIMA-B at the same venue on 24 January 2026.

== Members ==
- Ratchanon Ruenpech (Gun)
- Pannathorn Jirasart (Kim)
- Pavaris Srichaichana (Chokun)
- Gorn Wannapairote (Gorn)
- Oscar Edward Wattraserte (Onglee)
- Vorameth Kornubrabhan (Victor)

== Discography ==
=== Studio albums ===
Title	Details
Data Storage	Released: 4 August 2023; Label: Brothers Music; Formats: CD, digital download, streaming; Tracklist: 1. "Interlude : Data Storage"; 2. "Crazy Love" (รักบ้าบอ); 3. "Silent Mode" (คนไม่คุย); 4. "Unnoticed" (ที่ไม่รัก); 5. "Blurrr" (สถานะเบลอ); 6. "Hurting" (เจ็บอยู่); 7. "Lonely Boy" (เหงาอย่างนี้สินะ); 8. "Crush" (ชน); 9. "Stop!"
Level Up	Released: 2025; Label: Brothers Music; Formats: CD, digital download, streaming; Tracklist: 1. "Interlude : Level Up"; 2. "On That Day" (ตบปาก); 3. "Just Talk" (ชอบไหมไหนลองบอก); 4. "My Only One" (คนในใจ); 5. "Someone Someday"; 6. "If I Could" (เริ่มก่อน); 7. "Take Off" (พร้อมจะไป); 8. "Perhaps" (อาจจะเป็น); 9. "Kiss Kiss"

=== Singles ===
Year	Title	Album	Ref.
2026	"จีบไม่จบ (Someday, Say Yes)"	Duang with You OST	
2026	"ฮ็อบ (Hob)"	Non-album single	

== Awards ==
Year	Award	Category	Nominated work	Result	Ref.
2022	T-Pop Stage	Rookie of the Week (Weeks 38–39)	"Crazy Love"	Won	—
2022	T-Pop Stage	Music of the Week (Weeks 55–57)	"Silent Mode"	Won	
2022	Global Star Media Awards	Best Group of the Year	Proxie	Won	
2023	Kazz Awards 2023	Rising Male of the Year	Gorn Wannapairote	Won	
2023	Maya TV Awards	Best Pop Artist	Proxie	Won	
2024	The Guitar Mag Awards	Best Boy Band of the Year	Proxie	Won	
2025	TikTok Awards Thailand	Viral Song of the Year	"Bad Shawty"	Won	
2025	Thailand Top Vote	Outstanding T-POP Artist of the Year	Proxie	Won	
