= Natshin Medaw =

Natshin Medaw နတ်ရှင် မယ်တော်

Princess consort of Burma
- Tenure: 15 October 1581 – c. November 1586
- Predecessor: Hanthawaddy Mibaya
- Successor: Yaza Datu Kalaya
- Born: 1556; 918 ME; Ava (Inwa), Toungoo Empire
- Died: after 5 September 1610; Inwa
- Spouse: Mingyi Swa (divorced 1586)
- Issue: None
- House: Toungoo
- Father: Thado Minsaw of Ava
- Mother: Inwa Mibaya
- Religion: Theravada Buddhism

Natshin Medaw or Natshimmeh-daw (Burmese: နတ်ရှင် မယ်တော်, or နတ်သျှင် မယ်တော်, pronounced [naʔʃɪ̀ɴ mɛ̀dɔ̀]) was crown princess of Toungoo Dynasty of Burma (Myanmar) from 1581 to 1586.

== Early life ==
The princess the only child of Viceroy Thado Minsaw of Ava and Queen Inwa Mibaya in 1556. Their parents were closely related to each other: half-uncle and half-niece. She grew up in Ava (Inwa). She later moved to Pegu (Bago) when she was married to Mingyi Swa, her maternal first cousin, and her paternal half-cousin, once removed.

Ancestry of Natshin Medaw

8. Taungkha Min
4. Mingyi Swe
9. Kayenawaddy
2. Thado Minsaw
10. Kywe Sit Min
5. Sister of Shin Myo Myat
11. (Unnamed)
1. Natshin Medaw
12. Mingyi Swe
6. Bayinnaung
13. Shin Myo Myat
3. Inwa Mibaya
14. Mingyi Nyo
7. Atula Thiri
15. Yadana Dewi

== Crown princess ==
By chronicle accounts, the marriage was an unhappy one for both. It contributed to the fallout between her powerful parents and the high king Nanda that ultimately resulted in Ava's revolt in 1583–1584. In early 1583, Natshin Medaw sent a package to her parents, which contained a blood stained shawl and a letter. In the letter, she complained that her husband spent much of the time pursuing Princess Yaza Datu Kalaya, and that when she confronted him about the matter, he pushed her to the bedpost. The blood on the shawl, she explained, came from the cut on her forehead she received when she hit the bedpost.

The rebellion was put down in April 1584. The charade continued. Though she nominally remained the crown princess, Swa continued to pursue Yaza Data Kalaya, who was technically half-aunt to both Swa and Natshin Medaw. Yaza Datu Kalaya for her part continued to spurn her half-nephew's advances. But in October 1586, her protector Nanda went on a military campaign to Siam, and Swa remained in charge. Soon after, Swa raised her to be his queen, and in the process divorced Natshin Medaw. Back from Siam, the king was extremely unhappy to learn the news, and put Natshin Medaw in the same house as her mother with attendants.

== Later life ==
The princess lived with her mother for the next seven years until her death in January 1595. After Pegu fell in December 1599, Natshin Medaw, along with other Pegu royalty, was taken to Toungoo (Taungoo). She spent ten years in Toungoo. On 5 September [O.S. 26 August] 1610, King Anaukpetlun ordered that Min Taya Medaw, Min Htwe, and Natshin Medaw be sent to Ava (Inwa) with the full royal regalia befitting their former status.

== In popular culture ==
She was portrayed as a character in Thai television drama kasattriya (กษัตริยา) 2003 in the name Chao Nang thong cha vae Portrayed by sirivan sukul. and movies Supankanlaya (สุพรรณกัลยา) 2004 in the name Sirikanlaya Portrayed by Sarocha Watitapun, The Legend of King Naresuan: The Series season 3 Portrayed by Raiwin Ratsaminiyomwut. Thai television drama The Last Duel (หงสาวดี) (2026) Portrayed by Nicha Piyavattananon.

== Bibliography ==
- Kala, U (1724). Maha Yazawin (in Burmese). Vol. 1–3 (2006, 4th printing ed.). Yangon: Ya-Pyei Publishing.
- Royal Historical Commission of Burma (1832). Hmannan Yazawin (in Burmese). Vol. 1–3 (2003 ed.). Yangon: Ministry of Information, Myanmar.
- Than Kho, Shin (1615). Minye Deibba Egyin (in Burmese) (1967 ed.). Yangon: Hanthawaddy Press.

Natshin Medaw Toungoo Dynasty Born: 1556 Died: after 5 September 1610
Royal titles
Preceded by Hanthawaddy Mibaya	Princess consort of Burma; 15 October 1581 – c. November 1586	Succeeded by Yaza Datu Kalaya
