= Lao Krang =

Lao Khrang
Total population
- 53,000

Regions with significant populations
- Thailand

Languages
- Lao, Thai

Religion
- Theravada Buddhism

Related ethnic groups
- Lao, Thai, other Tai groups.

The Lao Khrang (Thai: ลาวครั่ง, RTGS: Lao Khrang, pronounced [lāːw kʰrâŋ]; endonym: [láːw kʰāŋ]) are a sub-group of the Lao ethnic group. Also known as the Tai Khrang (Thai: ไทครั่ง), they speak a dialect of the Lao language that is not too different from the modern Lao/Isan languages of Laos and Isan. The Lao Khrang should not be confused with the Tai Khang (spelt the same as 'Thai Krang' in Thai) who are a closely related people inhabiting northeastern Laos.

== Location ==
The Lao Khrang are spread out throughout Western and Central Thailand, especially the provinces of Phichit, Suphanburi, Uthai Thani, Chai Nat, Phitsanulok, Kamphaeng Phet, Nakhon Pathom and Nakhon Sawan.

== History ==
The Lao Khrang are descendants of Lao people from Luang Prabang and Houaphanh provinces who were enslaved by invading Siamese soldiers after the fall of the last remnant kingdoms of Lan Xang. The Lao Khrang were settled in the rich farmlands of Central Thailand to work as farm labourers to increase food production for the army and capital. Aside from their geographic isolation, the cultural traits and language of the Lao Khrang give away their ancestors' traditional homeland.

== Religion and culture ==
The Lao Khrang are Theravada Buddhists, but also maintain older animist beliefs. Especially revered is the tutelary spirit of the village, the hu chao nei. Traditional activities include farming, as well as making a red dye from beetles used to stain textiles, hence the namesake krang or 'lac'. Traditionally, marriages were only between members of the same group.
