= Auttapon Prakopkong =

Thai singer (born 1978)

Auttapon Prakopkong อรรถพล ประกอบของ
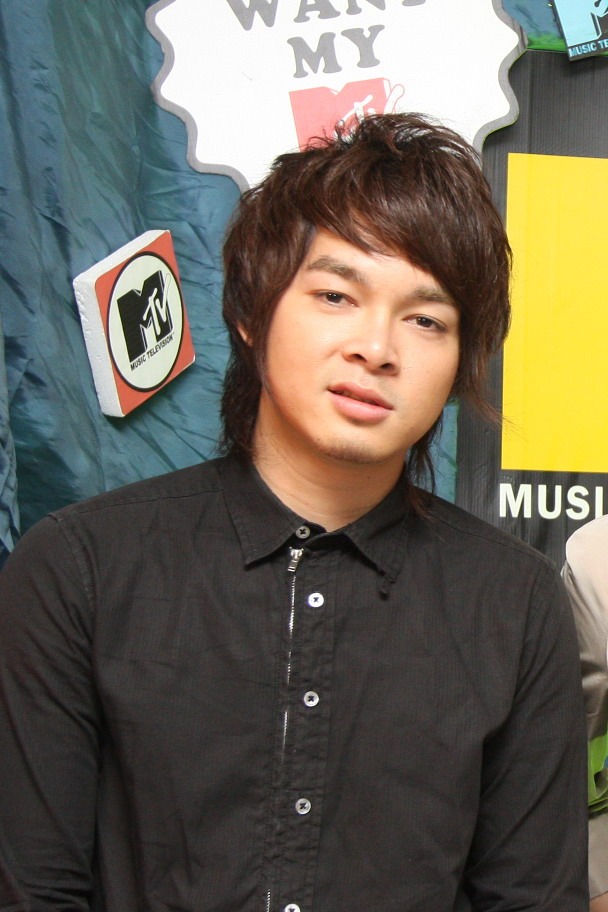

Background information
- Also known as: M The Star
- Born: 28 September 1978 (age 47); Chiang Mai, Thailand
- Genres: Pop; rock
- Occupation: Singer
- Years active: 2004–present
- Label: GMM Grammy
- Website: Official website

Auttapon Prakopkong (Thai: อรรถพล ประกอบของ, better known as M The Star, romanization variants: Attapon or Attapol or Attaphol from Thai) is a Thai singer and winner of the popular reality TV program The Star 2.

== Biography ==
He was born 28 September 1978, in Chiang Mai (Northern Thailand). Although his parents were divorced when he was only two years old, his strong determination to be a good person was always kept in his mind. This might be caused by his mother's advice as a teacher. As a teenager, he had a part-time job as a singer at the Public House in Chiang Mai. It led him to his goal of being a professional singer.

The first challenge came when he applied to join "The Star 1" together with his friends; Jeiw-Piyanuth and New-Napassorn. Both of the girls went to the final round but he was knocked out in the first round. Again, his strong determination to be a singer still continued as he later joined "The Star 2" in the next year and was the winner by getting 50.81% of the audience's vote in the final round. He finally achieved one of his dreams to be the winner of The Star. Later, he had a chance to release the debut album with the huge entertainment company in Thailand, GMM Grammy.

He decided to drop out of his first year at Payap University to focus on his singing career. In the future, he would like to have further education in the music field abroad.

== Discography ==
- Album "Your stars your songs vol.1" (Released 23 November 2004)
- Album "Your stars your songs vol.2" (Released 23 November 2004)
- VCD The Star2 Concert + bonus track (Released 23 November 2004)
- Single "krob krua bai mai" for the commercial of Bangchak co. ltd in 2005
- Single "barp na" Theme song of Thai drama named "proong ni mai sai tee ja rak kan" included in the Original Soundtrack Drama album. (Released 6 August 2005)
- Single "pee mai chai pom pee kor pood dai" feat. Nick-Ronavee (second to the Star 2 winner) included in Nick-Ronavee's debut album (Released in 2005)
- Album "M-Auttapon" his debut album released 12 July 2005.

The famous singles are "bok rak bao bao" "khao mai rak rao" and "ther khong mai roo". "Ther khong mai roo" was selected to be Drama; Wi marn sine Theme Song in 2005.

- Single "hua ork deau kan" feat. R-Anattapon (The winner of the Star 3) included in R-Anattapon's debut album released in 2006.
- Album "M The Second"–2nd album released 19 September 2006

The famous singles are "ya ron tua" "kon buang lang" and "luem mai pen"

- Single "ya ron tua" (M The Second) is collected to "GMM Grammy Best of the Year 2006" Album. (released in 2006)
- Single "khao mai rak rao", " tang mod jai" (debut album; M Attapon) "luem mai pen", "ya ron tua", and "khon buang lang" (the 2nd album; M The Second) are collected to The Star together Album released in 2006.
- Single "ya pai sia nam ta" and "klap mai dai pai mai teung" are included in Right The Celebration Album. This is a part of 25 Years of Nitipong Hornark – The Celebration Album (released 2 June 2007)
- Single "hua jai mai fang hed pol"; the first single (released 1 August 2007) from the third album (planned to be released in September 2007)
- Album "M My Way" 3rd album released in September 2007.
- Single "Ther poo pen jao kong hua jai" released 24 August 2007) from M My Way, selected as theme song in Drama "Leh ku larb" Thai TV Channel 3. It was on air on 26 August 2007.

=== Concerts ===
- "ID.F.L.Y. Fullfill Love Young Victim" at Thunder Dome, Muangthong Tanee, Thailand, 4 March 2006
- "The Star 3" at Impact Arena, Muangthong Tanee, Thailand, 30 April 2007
- "Thai Festival" at Yoyogi park, Harajuku, Tokyo, Japan, 12–13 May 2006
- "Thai Festival" at Osaka, Japan, 16–18 September 2006
- "HP color of love Concert" (together with Palmy) at BEC Tero Hall, Thailand, 14 February 2007
- "Thai Festival" at Phanomphen, Cambodia, 19 May 2007
- Be the guest of "Greenwave Concert" (Theme : Cover Night 25 years of Di-Nitipong) at Thammasart University, Thailand, 8 July 2007
- Be the guest of "25 years of Nitipong Concert" at Impact Arena, Thailand on 25 August 2007
- Be the guest of "Greenwave Concert" (Theme; number 10-The Lost Love Song) at Central World, Thailand, 28–29 September 2007
