= Sunait Chutintaranond =

Thai historian and screenwriter (born 1956)

Professor Dr. Sunait Chutintaranond
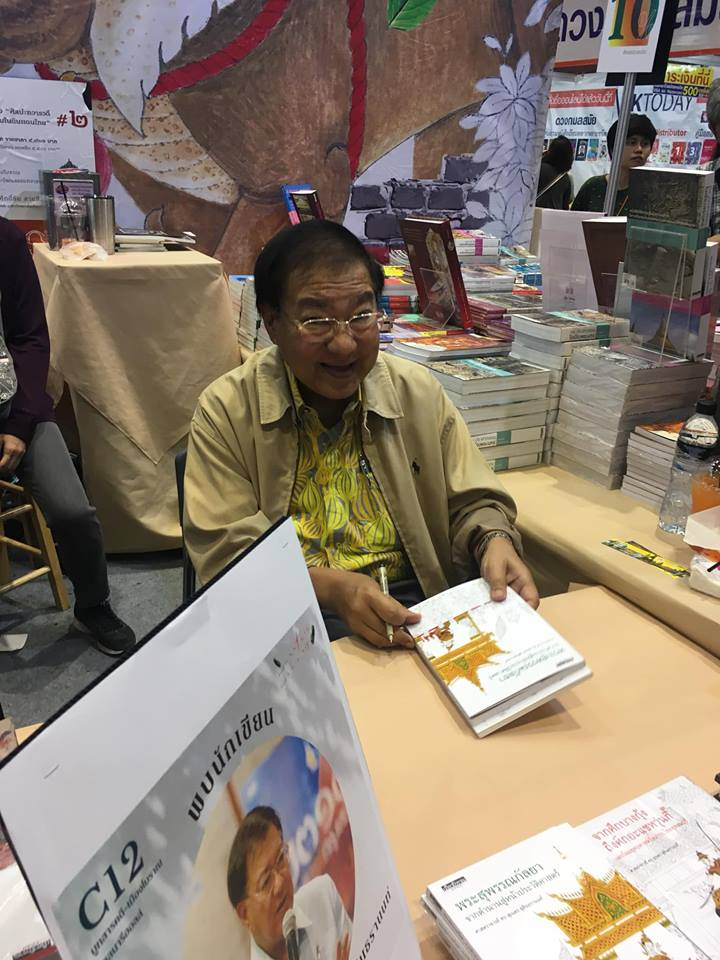
- Sunait Chutintaranond in 2019
- Born: สุเนตร ชุตินธรานนท์ 1956 (age 69–70)
- Citizenship: Thailand

Academic work
- Discipline: History
- Institutions: Institute of Asian Studies, Chulalongkorn University

Sunait Chutintaranond (Thai: สุเนตร ชุตินธรานนท์; RTGS: Sunet Chutintharanon; born 1956) is a Thai historian and screenwriter. He is a professor of history at the Institute of Asian Studies, Chulalongkorn University. His research focuses on the pre-modern history of Thailand and mainland Southeast Asia, particularly the Ayutthaya Kingdom, Thai–Burmese relations, and multicultural societies in Thailand. He has also collaborated with film director Chatrichalerm Yukol on the screenplays of several historical drama films, including the King Naresuan series.

== Life ==
Sunait completed his undergraduate studies of history at Thammasat University, his bachelor's degree in 1978 was awarded with first-class honors and gold medal. He continued his studies in the United States at Cornell University's Southeast Asian Studies program, completing his M.A. in history in 1982 and Ph.D. in 1990. The topic of his dissertation was Cakravartin: Ideology, Reason and Manifestation of Siamese and Burmese Kings in Traditional Warfare (1548–1605).

A professor of history at the Faculty of Arts, Chulalongkorn University, Sunait served as the director of the university's Thai Studies Centre, director of the Institute of Asian Studies and dean of the Graduate School. He has published mostly on the mid- to late Ayutthaya period (16th to 18th century) and its relationships and conflicts with powers in neighbouring Burma.

== Works (selected) ==
- Cakravartin: Ideology, Reason and Manifestation of Siamese and Burmese Kings in Traditional Warfare (1548–1605). Cornell University. 1990.
- "Mandala, Segmentary State and Polities of Centralization in Medieval Ayudhya". Journal of the Siam Society. 78 (1): 89–100. 1990.
- Sunait Chutintaranond; Than Tun, eds. (1995). On Both Sides of the Tenasserim Range: History of Siamese–Burmese Relations. Institute of Asian Studies, Chulalongkorn University.
- Sunait Chutintaranond; Chris Baker, eds. (2002). Recalling Local Pasts: Autonomous History in Southeast Asia. Silkworm Books.

== Filmography ==
- The Legend of Suriyothai (2001)
- King Naresuan (Parts 1–6; 2006–2015)
- Pantai Norasingha (2015)
