= The Legend of King Naresuan: The Series =

Thai historical Television series

- Official promotional poster (Thai)
- ตำนานสมเด็จพระนเรศวรมหาราช เดอะซีรีส์
- Genre: Historical drama
- Created by: Mono Broadcast Co. Ltd. FukDuk Production Co. Ltd.
- Screenplay by: Chalermchatri Yukol; Worrayut Phichaisorrat
- Story by: Bhanubandhu Yugala; Chatrichalerm Yukol
- Directed by: Chalermchatri Yukol
- Starring: Panukorn Wongbunmak; Nutchanont Bunsiri; Napapach Thitakawin; Pattarakorn Prasertset; Pacharanamon Nonthapa; Atiwat Snitwong Na Ayutthaya; Siraprapha Sukdumrong; Paramej Noi-Um; Kasarb Jumpadib
- Ending theme: "Sun Light", composed by Yanin
- No. of episodes: 12 episodes

Production
- Executive producers: Pete Bodharamik; Dr. Soraj Asavaprapha; Navamin Prasopnet; Sang Do Lee
- Producers: Chalermchatri Yukol; Kunakorn Sethi; Bangorn Im-aem; Thunpattra Wongnoppavit (season 1 only); Krist Insompan; Uthane Okchor (season 2 only); Thatchaphong Suphasri (season 2 only)
- Running time: Approx. 45–48 minutes

Original release
- Network: MONO29
- Release: January 9, 2017 – July 12, 2019

The Legend of King Naresuan: The Series (also known as King Naresuan The Series in Thailand; Thai: ตำนานสมเด็จพระนเรศวรมหาราช เดอะซีรีส์, RTGS: Tamnan Somdet Phra Naresuan Maharat The Series) is a Thai period-drama television adaptation of the biographical film series of the same name. It depicts the life of Naresuan, who ruled the Ayutthaya Kingdom from 1590 to 1605.

The series is directed by Chalermchatri Yukol, son of the original film's director. Unlike the films, the television adaptation features a new cast, with the exception of Sorapong Chatree, who reprises his role as Mahathera Khanchong.

== Plot ==
The series is a television adaptation of the biographical film of the same name.

The first season portrays Prince Naresuan's boyhood, when he is taken as a hostage to the Toungoo Empire by King Bayinnaung to ensure the loyalty of the Ayutthaya Kingdom. During his captivity, he becomes a novice Buddhist monk under the guidance of a mentor monk (played by Sorapong Chatree).

The second season follows Naresuan as a young military commander serving King Nanda Bayin, leading campaigns against rebellious vassal states. His growing experience and strategic ability ultimately culminate in his decision to rebel and declare Ayutthaya's independence.

The third and final season depicts Naresuan's reign as king and his leadership during the Burmese–Siamese War (1593–1600) against the Toungoo Empire.

== Cast ==
- Panukorn Wongbunmak as Naresuan (young)
- Nutchanont Bunsiri as Naresuan (teenager; season 1)
- Daweerit Chullasapya as Naresuan (teenager; season 2 onwards)
- Pattarakorn Prasertset as Mingyi Swa (young)
- Korapat Kirdpan as Mingyi Swa (teenager; season 1)
- Aungoont Thanasapchroen as Mingyi Swa (teenager; season 2 onwards)
- Nuanchan Na Thalang as Manechan (young; season 1)
- Napapach Thitakawin as Manechan (teenager; season 1)
- Pacharawan Vadrukchit as Manechan (teenager; season 2 onwards)
- Nongbiw Khaokong as Saming
- Sitthochok Puerkpoonpol as Rachamanu (Bunting) (teenager; season 1)
- Rachan Sharma as Rachamanu (Bunting) (teenager; season 2 onwards)
- Atiwat Snitwong Na Ayutthaya as Maha Thammaracha
- Pacharanamon Nonthapa as Suphankanlaya (seasons 1–3)
- Pattharawadee Laosa as Wilaikalaya
- Paramej Noi-Um as Bayinnaung
- Kasarb Jumpadib as Nanda Bayin
- Sorapong Chatree as Mahathera Khanchong
- Lervith Sangsit as Mahinthrathirat
- Sukol Sasijullaka as Maha Chakkraphat
- Ratchanon Ruenpech as Ekathotsarot (teenager; season 1 only)
- Pitchawut Piemthammaroj as Ekathotsarot (teenager; season 2 only)
- Siraprapha Sukdumrong as Wisut Kasattri
- Nussara Prawanna as Meng Pyu
- Jirawath Wachirasarunpach as Lord Tala
- Tanayong Wongtrakul as Lord Luckwaitummoo
