= Chalermchatri Yukol =

Thai film and television series director (born 1985)

Mom Rajawongse Chalermchatri Yukol
- Born: Chalermchatri Yukol; September 28, 1985 (age 40); Bangkok, Thailand
- Other name: Adam
- Occupations: Film director; television director; radio host
- Years active: 2011–present
- Known for: The Black Death (2015); The Legend of King Naresuan: The Series (2017-present)
- Parent(s): Chatrichalerm Yukol (father); Kamala Yukol (mother)
- Website: fukduk.tv

Mom Rajawongse Chalermchatri Yukol (Thai: หม่อมราชวงศ์เฉลิมชาตรี ยุคล; born September 28, 1985), is a Thai film and television series director. He started his career as a radio host. He directed the films Sarawat Maba (Thai: สารวัตรหมาบ้า) (2013), The Black Death (Thai: ผีห่าอโยธยา) (2015). He is directing the television series The Legend of King Naresuan: The Series. Yukol is usually known by his nickname Adam (Thai: อดัม/ คุณชายอดัม).

== Early life ==
He is the son of Chatrichalerm Yukol and Kamala Yukol and graduated from Bond University in film from Australia. He was 3rd assistant director in film series King Naresuan. Later he created entertainment work in Internet, film websites, behind the scenes from film and all promotional merchandise at FukDuk company. He lectured at leading universities such as Chulalongkorn University, Thammasat University, Bangkok University and Assumption University.

He launched the FuKDuK website, a TV service that offers its own content on October 14, 2007. He regularly hosts radio shows in FM 96.5 MHz in the Mass Communication Organization of Thailand (MCOT) He is currently the Program Director of Viu Thailand.

== Filmography ==
=== Film ===
- Sarawat Maba (2013)
- The Black Death (2015)
- Thai Niyom, Episode: Step (2016–Short fim)
- Tossapith Thammaracha, Episode: donate (2016–Short fim)

=== Television ===
- Tee Sam: The Series, Episode: Viral Vlogger (2016)
- The Legend of King Naresuan: The Series (2017)

== Honours ==
- Knight Grand Cordon (Special Class) of the Most Exalted Order of the White Elephant (2012)
- Knight Grand Cordon (Special Class) of the Most Noble Order of the Crown of Thailand (2008)
- Grand Companion (Third Class, upper grade) of the Most Illustrious Order of Chula Chom Klao (1996)
- Companion (Fourth Class) of the Most Admirable Order of the Direkgunabhorn (2002)
- King Rama IX Royal Cypher Medal, 4th Class (1996)
