= King Naresuan (film) =

Six-part Thai historical drama film series (2007–2015)

The Legend of King Naresuan
- Thai movie poster
- Directed by: Prince Chatrichalerm Yukol
- Written by: Prince Chatrichalerm Yukol; Sunait Chutintaranond
- Based on: Life of King Naresuan the Great
- Produced by: Kunakorn Sethi
- Starring: Wanchana Sawatdee; Taksaorn Paksukcharern; Chatchai Plengpanich; Intira Jaroenpura; Sorapong Chatree; Sompop Benjatikul
- Music by: Richard Harvey (Parts 1–2, 4); Sandy McLaren (Parts 1–3); Ros Caollum (Part 3); Toadsak Janparn (Parts 5–6)
- Distributed by: Prommitr International Production; Sahamongkol Film International
- Release dates: January 18, 2007 (Part I); February 15, 2007 (Part II); March 31, 2011 (Part III); August 11, 2011 (Part IV); May 29, 2014 (Part V); April 9, 2015 (Part VI)
- Country: Thailand
- Languages: Old Thai; Mon; Burmese
- Budget: 700 million baht (combined for six films)

The Legend of King Naresuan (Thai: ตำนานสมเด็จพระนเรศวรมหาราช; RTGS: Tamnan Somdet Phra Naresuan Maha Rat) is a Thai biographical historical drama film series about King Naresuan the Great, who ruled Siam from 1590 to 1605.

Directed by Chatrichalerm Yukol as a follow-up to his 2003 film The Legend of Suriyothai, the series chronicles Naresuan's life from his captivity in Burma during childhood to his rise as a military leader and eventual declaration of Siamese independence. The films were released in the United States under the collective title Kingdom of War.

The six-film series traces the life of King Naresuan from his childhood as a royal hostage in the court of King Bayinnaung, through his training as a novice monk and the formation of key alliances and rivalries in Pegu, to his rise as a military commander and his declaration of Siamese independence. The later films depict his major campaigns against the Burmese, including the escalating conflicts with King Nanda Bayin, culminating in the decisive confrontation with Crown Prince Mingyi Swa and the final campaigns that shaped the course of Ayutthaya's relationship with the Burmese kingdoms.

In production for more than three years, the project had an estimated budget of 700 million baht, making it the most expensive Thai film ever made.

As King of Fire, Part II was selected as Thailand's submission to the 80th Academy Awards for Best Foreign Language Film.

== Plot ==
=== Part I: Hongsawadee's Hostage ===
The film focuses on the childhood of King Naresuan. Born in 1555, he was taken to Burma as a political hostage, where he grew up exposed to military training and swordsmanship—skills that would later make him a serious threat to the Burmese empire.

The story opens in 1564, during the Burmese siege of Phitsanulok, then the center of the declining Sukhothai polity. After surrendering, Naresuan's father, Maha Thammarachathirat, is compelled to hand over his two sons—Naresuan (known as the Black Prince) and Ekathotsarot (the White Prince)—to be raised in Pegu, the capital of the Hanthawaddy kingdom, under the supervision of King Bayinnaung. Bayinnaung assures that Naresuan will be treated as if he were his own child.

The decision creates a deep rift between Naresuan's parents, as Queen Wisut Kasattri resents the humiliation of seeing her sons removed while Phitsanulok becomes a Burmese vassal. Soon afterward, the neighboring Ayutthaya also falls to Burmese control.

Upon arriving at the Burmese court, Naresuan quickly becomes aware of palace politics, including the rivalry between himself and Bayinnaung's grandson, Mingyi Swa. Naresuan is soon sent to study as a novice monk under a Mon monk named Khanchong at a monastery outside the palace.

While exploring the nearby Thai village—inhabited by Siamese families displaced by Bayinnaung's expansionist campaigns and forced relocations to Hanthawaddy—Naresuan befriends a Mon street child who is later taken in as a temple boy, Bunthing (who would eventually become the Mon leader Lord Rachamanu). He also forms a friendship with Maneechan, a girl who works at the monastery.

Under Khanchong's guidance—who had once trained Bayinnaung himself—Naresuan develops both his military skills and his moral discipline.

=== Part II: Reclaiming Sovereignty ===
Bayinnaung dies in the beginning of the film from natural causes. Thammaracha, the governor-king of Ayutthaya, believes it is important that he go and pay respect to the dead king out of fear that the new Burmese king Nanda would deem it as an insult and attack Ayutthaya. Prince Naresuan, however, having been raised in Pegu (the kingdom of Hanthawaddy) and who regards Bayinnaung as a second father, convinces Thammaracha to let him go in his place.

Upon arriving in Hanthawaddy (Hongsawadi in Thai), Naresuan's childhood teacher, a Buddhist monk named Khan Chong, informs him about the dangers that king Nanda and many factions in Burma are plotting his assassination. At king Bayinnaung's funeral, all representatives from vassal kingdoms are present besides for one, the Krang kingdom. King Nanda sees it as disrespect and seizes the opportunity to wage war and siege the mountain top city. Naresuan's Ayutthaya army is successful in taking the mountain top city and proves itself superior to the rival Burmese armies, namely of the Lord of Pyay and of Mingyi Swa (the eldest son of Nandabayin). Burmese rivals felt even more threatened by the strength and wits of Naresuan's army. During the battle, Naresuan's friend, Bunthing, now a highly skilled general under Naresuan, falls for the princess of Krang, who becomes his companion.

A plot is uncovered by Naresuan's childhood friends, two Mon rulers, that the Burmese are in fact planning the assassination of Naresuan. Upon finding out, Naresuan executes the plotters and ceremoniously declares Ayutthaya free and sovereign from Hanthawaddy. King Nanda and his Burmese are furious and begin a military campaign to capture and kill king Naresuan before his forces and liberated Siamese subjects can reach the Sittaung River. King Naresuan uses the strategy of a fighting retreat. His forces built a wooden bridge across the river and engage the pursuing Burmese army as they follow. Several battles took place during the crossing. However, as the Burmese forces catch up, the Siamese citizens and forces have already crossed to the other bank.

The Burmese, determined to defeat the Siamese, try to pursue Naresuan's forces by crossing the river. The king is then approached by his revered Buddhist teacher, Mon monk Khanchong. Here, he is given a special musket, which is capable of firing across the river. According to history, the movie portrays king Naresuan firing the musket across the Sittaung River, and with one strike, killing the general of the Burmese army. With the general dead, Burmese forces retreated back to Hanthawaddy. King Naresuan and his now independent Siamese forces head back to Ayutthaya and the king declares; "It's not over yet, there is more work for us to do!"

=== Part III: Naval Battle ===
In 1584, at Kraeng, King Naresuan continued the war for the independence of the Ayutthaya Kingdom. The conflict escalated when King Nanda Bayin of the Toungoo dynasty secretly ordered two armies to attack Ayutthaya. The first force, led by the Lord of Pathein, advanced through the Three Pagodas Pass. The second, commanded by Nawrahta Minsaw of Lan Na (Chiang Mai), marched from the north and established a camp at Ban Sra Ket.

While both Burmese and Lanna armies were preparing their offensive, the king of Longvek sent a Chinese official, Lord Jinjantu, to spy in Ayutthaya. However, he soon retreated after King Naresuan discovered his mission. Following a fierce river battle between Jinjantu's Chinese troops and Siamese gunboats under Naresuan's personal command, he managed to escape.

When the King of Longvek learns of Naresuan's military skill, he attempts to form an alliance with Ayutthaya by sending his reluctant brother, Prince Srisuphanrachathirat, to assist in the war against Hanthawaddy. As Naresuan prepares for the coming campaign, he realizes that Ayutthaya's forces are significantly outnumbered by the two Burmese armies. He therefore resolves to defeat each force separately before they can unite.

Naresuan first confronts and defeats the army of the Lord of Pathein west of Ayutthaya. He then engages the northern force commanded by King Nawrahta Minsaw of Lanna and, after a hard-fought battle, secures another victory. Once King Nanda Bayin concludes his war with Inn Wa, he resumes his campaign against Ayutthaya; however, Naresuan ultimately succeeds in preserving Ayutthaya's independence.

=== Part IV: The Nanda Bayin War ===
Naresuan is injured trying to storm a Burmese camp. His advisors told him to avoid direct contact with enemy troops but he ignores and climb the ladder. He initially slays a few Burmese soldiers before the Burmese camp commander stabs him with a spear.

Nanda Bayin orders his son, Mingyi Swa to eliminate King Naresuan, saying that he doesn't care what losses the Burmese suffer. They must take down the king so that the Siamese forces would be easier to defeat.

The Burmese send their army to defeat Siam but were unsuccessful.

=== Part V: Elephant Battle ===
Nanda Bayin was humiliated by his crushing defeats by King Naresuan. He sent his son Mingyi Swa with an army to attack Ayutthaya. Naresuan planned the battle with his generals and came up with a decision to fight at Nong Sarai. The larger Burmese force under Mingy Swa was faced with a smaller army by King Naresuan. Naresuan calls Mingyi Swa for an elephant duel. Fearing humiliation of his royalty, he accepts the duel. Ekathosarot also duels with Chaophraya Chaiyanuphap. Naresuan and Mingyi Swa fought in the middle of an open field. Naresuan was cut in his helmet, but managed to continue fighting and was able to slay Mingyi Swa. Ekathosarot also slays Chaophraya Chaiyanuphap. The Burmese army soon retreats from Siam. This will be the last Burmese invasion that Nanda Bayin will have ordered. After his victory, Naresuan planned to order the execution of all his soldiers that didn't participate in the fight with him, but he was convinced by Khanchong, his childhood monk teacher to not have them executed and sent to fight Burma.

=== Part VI: The end of Hong Sa ===
Naresuan receives news from a Burmese deserter that the Burmese king Nanda Bayin, enraged over the loss of his son, had ordered the deaths of most of the military leaders in his Army, on the grounds that they had 'let his son die'. There was also news that, in his rage, Nanda Bayin had also killed off Suphankalaya, Naresuan's older sister. This angers the King, and he quickly announces his intention to gather an army, capture Pegu, and burn it to the ground as revenge. Nanda Bayin was met by the viceroy of Toungoo and was requested to leave Pegu and retreat to Toungoo. The Lord of Pyay marched his army to loot the city. The city was later sacked by the Arakans. When Naresuan reached the city, he saw the once glorious city in ruins. His generals advised him that supply lines are stretched thin and he could march up to catch Nanda Bayin, but Naresuan insisted that the Siamese army can use Mawlamyine to supply. The Siamese army marched up to Toungoo. Toungoo was besieged by the Siamese army after the viceroy of Toungoo refused to hand over Nanda Bayin. Natshinnaung the prince of Toungoo didn't enjoy Nanda Bayin's presence in the city so he got into an agreement with Naresuan. He would allow Naresuan to get into the palace of Toungoo and execute Nanda Bayin. Nanda Bayin crossed the moats of the city and entered Nanda Bayin's chamber. Nanda Bayin then admits his guilt to Naresuan and shows his burnt face. Naresuan then spares Nanda Bayin and takes the Siamese army back to Ayutthaya. Natshinnaung later assassinates Nanda Bayin by poisoning him. Naresuan arrives back to Ayutthaya to tell his monk that we will retire and be a monk. His brother Ekathosarot would ascend to the throne.

== Cast ==
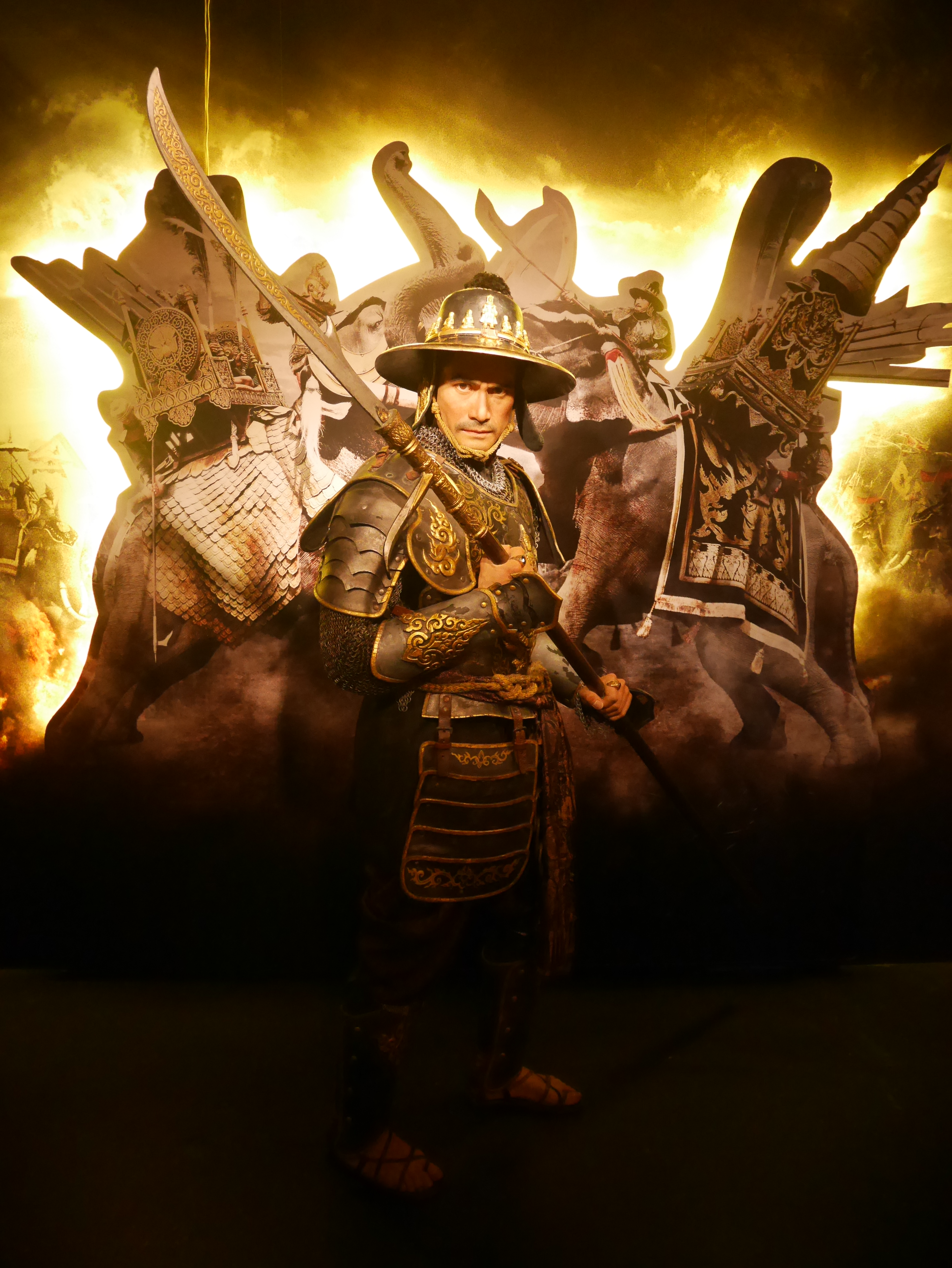
Wax statue of Wanchana Sawatdee as King Naresuan the Great at the wax museum Madame Tussauds Bangkok.

- Wanchana Sawatdee as Naresuan
- Pratcha Sananvatananont as Naresuan (youth)
- Napatsakorn Mitr-em as Mingyi Swa
- Nopachai Jayanama as Rachamanu (Bunting)
- Taksaorn Paksukcharern as Manichan
- Suchada Chekly as Manichan (youth)
- Chatchai Plengpanich as Mahathammarachathirat
- Grace Mahadumrongkul as Suphankanlaya
- Intira Jaroenpura as Lurkin
- Sompob Benjatikul as Bayinnaung
- Jakkrit Amarat as Nanda Bayin
- Sorapong Chatree as Mahathera Khanchong
- Santisuk Promsiri as Mahinthrathirat
- Saranyu Wongkrajang as Mahachakkraphat
- Winthai Suvaree as Ekathotsarot
- Dom Hetrakul as Suea Han Fa
- Jirayu La-ongmanee as Bunting (youth)
- Manop Aswathep as Lord Sawankhalok
- Krung Sriwilai as Lord Phichai
- Chumphorn Thepphithak as King of Krang

== Production ==
=== Special effects ===
Production on The Legend of King Naresuan began in 2003 on a purpose-built set in Kanchanaburi Province.

Looking for advice on costuming and special effects, Chatrichalerm had met in Bangkok with director Baz Luhrmann, who advised the Thai director to get in contact with Peter Jackson and observe him making King Kong. Through Jackson, Chatrichalerm met with people from the Weta Workshop and worked out a trade of knowledge, in which the New Zealand effects artists would share techniques for making light armor while learning from Thai craftsmen about gold jewellery making. New tools and equipment have been made, the production crew were sent to training abroad, and the experts in the industry from such movies as “Troy,” “The Lord of the Rings,” and “Anaconda” have been working as the consultants and supervisors of the production of “Naresuan.” The experts have tremendously conveyed various techniques in movie making and assisted in training to equip the Thai crew members with the knowledge and skills necessary to produce quality movies and to enable them to develop to their fullest potential to raise the status of the film industry in Thailand to be equal to leading film industries in the western world in the near future.

=== Film Location ===
Based on the film website, the location covers the area of approximately 2,000 rai in the compound of Surasee Military Base in Kanchanaburi Province to be in compliance with the historical records specifying that various major incidents in the life of King Naresuan took place in this province. In addition to historical significance, the location is appropriate and the production has received tremendous support from the Royal Thai Army, providing access to the location, manpower, as well as equipment and tools necessary for the completion of the construction of the sound stages.

=== Casting ===
Actor Wanchana Sawatdee, in his feature film debut as Naresuan, is a cavalry officer in the Royal Thai Army with the rank of captain. Chatrichalerm said he cast a newcomer in the role "to avoid any possible negative image."

"The king is also a brave warrior, so Captain Wanchana, a professional cavalry soldier with a macho look, was a perfect fit for the character."

Grace Mahadumrongkul, who portrays Naresuan's sister, Supankulayanee, was cast in the role in 2006. Previously, she was a presenter on Thai television Channel 5.

Other roles include King Bayinnaung, who is portrayed by Sompop Benjatikul, and the Buddhist monk, Mahathera Khanchong, portrayed by Sorapong Chatree. Both are veteran actors who have worked with Chatrichalerm before.

== Reception ==
=== Part I ===
King Naresuan Part I: Hongsawadee's Hostage, grossed more than 100 million baht on its opening weekend, despite some production problems with the film. After a world premiere screening on January 16, director Chatrichalerm Yukol continued to edit the film. On opening day, January 18, 2007, prints of the film were still not ready for wide distribution, and were delivered late in the day in Bangkok cinemas and screenings were canceled in the provinces.

Part I received mixed reviews in the local media. The Bangkok Post said the film was "torn between the need to be a serious historical movie and popular entertainment for the masses." But The Nation called it "a beautiful movie, planned to meticulous detail with the exotic designs and colors of the royal dresses, golden palaces and exotic temples." The Nation also hosted a forum for readers to comment on the film.

=== Part II ===
King Naresuan Part II: Reclamation of Sovereignty, premiered in a wide theatrical release in Thailand on February 15, 2007. The #1 film at the Thailand box office for several weeks, it earned US$7 million.

Critical reception was more favorable than the first installment. Kong Rithdee of the Bangkok Post said: "Surprise, surprise: Naresuan II is good fun. The pacing crisp, the acting passionate, the warfare intense."

Jeerawat Na Talang, columnist for The Nation, wrote on her blog: "This is simply the best Thai film I have seen in years ... Compared to the first one, the sequel is better such as in terms of cast and editing."

Submitted as King of Fire, Part II was Thailand's entry to the 80th Academy Awards for Best Foreign Language Film.

Part II was also the opening film at the 2007 Cinemanila International Film Festival, and both films were screened out of competition in the Thai Panorama section of the 2007 Bangkok International Film Festival.

== Television series ==
On 9 January 2017, a television series titled The Legend of King Naresuan: The Series was released, broadcast by Mono 29 in Thailand. The series is directed by Chalermchatri Yukol, the son of the films' director. The television series has a storyline that isn't significantly different from the film.
