= Mingyi Swa =

Mingyi Swa မင်းကြီးစွာ

Heir Apparent of Burma
- Reign: 15 October 1581 – 8 January [O.S. 29 December 1592] 1593
- Predecessor: Nanda
- Successor: Minye Kyawswa II
- Born: 27 November 1558; Sunday, 2nd waning of Nadaw 920 ME; Pegu (Bago), Toungoo Empire
- Died: 8 January [O.S. 29 December 1592] 1593 (aged 34); Friday, 8th waxing of Tabodwe 954 ME; Suphan Buri, Siam
- Burial: February 1593; Tabaung 954 ME; Kanbawzathadi Palace
- Spouse: Natshin Medaw (divorced 1586); Yaza Datu Kalaya (1586–1593)
- House: Taungoo
- Father: Nanda
- Mother: Hanthawaddy Mibaya
- Religion: Theravada Buddhism

Mingyi Swa (Burmese: မင်းကြီးစွာ, pronounced [mɪ́ɴdʑí swà] or [mɪ́ɴdʑí zwà]; 27 November 1558 – 8 January [O.S. 29 December 1592] 1593) was heir apparent of Burma from 1581 to 1593. The eldest son of King Nanda of the Toungoo Dynasty led three out of the five Burmese invasions of Siam between 1584 and 1593, all of which ended in complete failure. He died in action during the fifth invasion in 1593. In prevailing Thai history, he was killed in single combat by King Naresuan. However no other accounts, including the earliest Siamese records and European accounts, mention a formal elephant duel between the two. The Burmese chronicles say Swa was felled by a Siamese mortar round.

== Early life ==
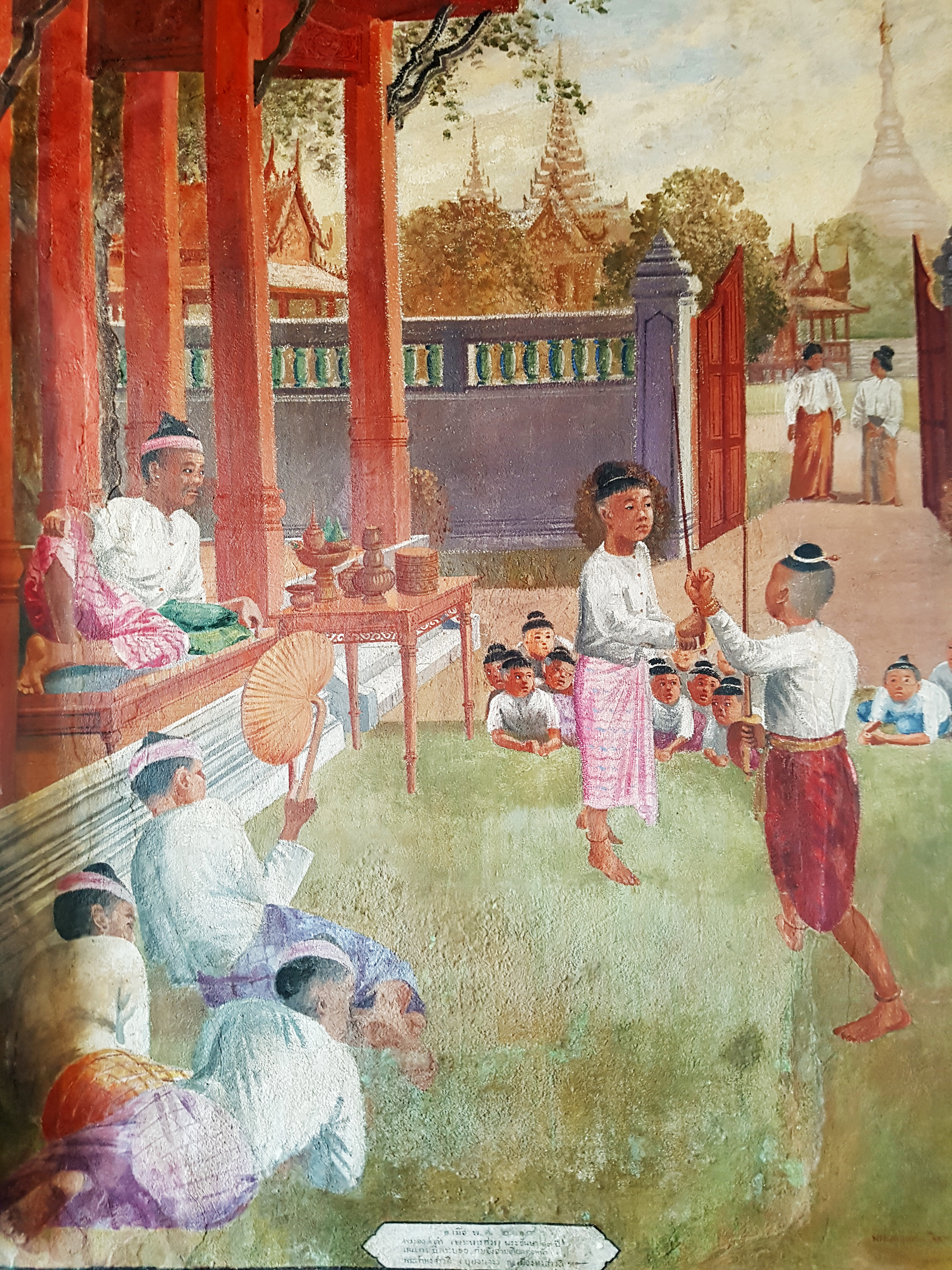
Prince Swa and Prince Ongdam playing in front of Bayinnaung

Mingyi Swa was born to Crown Prince Nanda and his chief consort Hanthawaddy Mibaya on 27 November 1558 in Pegu (Bago). (Note: (Ohn Shwe 1966: xxviii): Sunday, 2nd waning of Nadaw 920 ME = 27 November 1558 per a contemporary poem Maha Upayaza eigyin by Thinkhaya, Governor of Talote about the early life of Mingyi Swa.) He was the third child and the first son of the couple, and had six other full siblings.

Ancestry of Crown Prince Mingyi Swa

8. Mingyi Swe
4. Bayinnaung
9. Shin Myo Myat
2. Nanda
10. Mingyi Nyo
5. Atula Thiri
11. Yadana Dewi
1. Mingyi Swa
12. Mingyi Nyo
6. Tabinshwehti
13. Yaza Dewi
3. Hanthawaddy Mibaya
14. Mingyi Swe
7. Dhamma Dewi
15. Shin Myo Myat

The prince grew up in Pegu during a period in which his grandfather King Bayinnaung founded the largest empire in Southeast Asia. Bayinnaung died on 10 October 1581, and Nanda succeeded the throne. Nanda made Swa his heir-apparent on 15 October 1581. (Note: (Hmannan Vol. 3 2003: 73): Sunday, 5th waning of Tazaungmon 943 ME = 15 October 1581) The prince, who was not yet 23, was now the heir-apparent of an "absurdly overextended" empire.

== Military campaigns ==
The empire had been largely held together by Bayinnaung's personal relationships with his vassal rulers, who were loyal to Bayinnaung and not the kingdom of Toungoo. As it turned out, King Nanda never gained the full allegiance of his vassals. Within the first three years, both Ava (Inwa) and Siam revolted. Nanda put down the Ava rebellion but Siam proved a far more difficult project. Nanda came to rely heavily on his eldest son to reconquer Siam. Between 1584 and 1593, Mingyi Swa would lead four out of five campaigns that all ended in failure for the invaders, and ultimately claimed his life.

=== First invasion of Siam (1584) ===
The Siamese revolt took place right under Mingyi Swa's watch. In April 1584, Nanda and his armies were in Upper Burma for the campaign against Ava. Mingyi Swa had stayed behind at the capital Pegu (Bago) with an army to guard the rear. The Siamese army led by Crown Prince Naresuan, instead of marching to Ava to join Nanda's armies, hovered around Pegu, and openly disobeyed Swa's orders to march to Ava. Naresuan withdrew to Martaban (Mottama), and formally declared Ayutthaya's independence from Pegu on 3 May [O.S. 23 April] 1584. Still in Upper Burma, Nanda in haste sent two armies (11,000 men, 900 horses, 90 elephants) to chase the Siamese troops to their country. Swa was the deputy commander-in-chief behind his father. An 11,000-man invasion force could have never conquered Siam, let alone in the rainy season. Indeed, the troops were caught unprepared by the flooded countryside by the Chao Phraya, and were nearly wiped out by Siamese on their war canoes.

=== Second invasion (1586) ===
In March 1586, Swa again led another expedition force (12,000 troops, 1200 horses, 100 elephants) from Lan Na into northern Siam. The goal was to seize northern Siam in preparation for a larger campaign planned for the following dry season. But the army could not get past a heavily fortified Lampang, and had to withdraw in June as the rainy season came.

=== Third invasion (1586–1587) ===
Despite the failure to conquer northern Siam, Nanda proceeded with his planned invasion of Siam in October 1586, targeting the Siamese capital itself. Swa was left to guard Pegu. Nanda's invasion too failed. He laid siege to Ayutthaya for over four months (December 1586 to April 1587) but could not break through. Only a small portion of the original 25,000 men made it back to Pegu.

=== Fourth invasion (1590–1591) ===
Nanda had not given up. In 1590, the king again ordered Swa to lead another invasion of northern Siam. Nanda had planned a full-scale invasion but had to scale back his plans to northern Siam because northern Shan states of Mohnyin and Mogaung had also revolted. On 24 November [O.S. 14 November] 1590, Swa again invaded northern Siam from Lan Na. It was essentially a repeat of the 1586 invasion except in the severity of defeat. Like in 1586, his army could not again get past the Lampang fort led by Naresuan. But unlike in 1586, it was no mere retreat. The 24-regiment, 20,000-man army was thoroughly defeated outside Lampang in March 1591. The remaining regiments arrived back in such disarray that Nanda verbally disparaged Mingyi Swa and executed some of the top generals.

=== Fifth and final campaign (1592–1593) ===
The momentum of the war was swinging to Siam's favor. In the following dry season of 1591–1592, Naresuan raided the upper Tenasserim coast. In response, Nanda and the court agreed to another invasion of Siam. Nanda again appointed Swa commander-in-chief but also appointed his vassal rulers of Prome, Toungoo and Lan Na as deputies. On 4 November [O.S. 25 October] 1592, (Note: (Maha Yazawin Vol. 3 2006: 93) gives Wednesday, 12th waxing of Nadaw 954 ME which translates to Sunday, 14 November [O.S. 4 November] 1592. But (Hmannan Vol. 3 2003: 93) corrects it as Wednesday, 2nd waxing of Nadaw, which translates to Wednesday, 4 November 1592, NS.) two armies (24,000 men, 2000 horses, 150 elephants) tried again. The invasion ended in failure, and in Mingyi Swa's death in a battle near Ayutthaya. Both Burmese and Siamese chronicles say he died in battle but they give different accounts of how exactly he died, and when he died.

==== Burmese chronicle account ====
According to the Burmese chronicles, Swa's forces penetrated all the way to the outskirts of Ayutthaya. There, the army was met by Naresuan's army. On 8 January [O.S. 29 December 1592] 1593, a battle ensued. Both Burmese and Siamese commanders fought on war elephants. During the course of the battle, a Burmese war elephant named Pauk-Kyaw Zeya (ပေါက်ကျော်ဇေယျ) ridden by the governor of Zapayo (ဇာပရိုး), went on musth, and initially charged Siamese vanguard lines toward Naresuan. But the elephant was pushed back. It returned to the Burmese lines, and went after Swa's elephant.

Swa and his two mahouts unsuccessfully tried to fight off the enraged elephant but their elephant was pushed out of position into the open view of the enemy. Both elephants immediately came under Siamese fire, and Swa and the front mahout were felled by a mortar round. The lone survivor, the middle mahout named Tuyin Bala (တုရင်ဗလ), tried to hide Swa's death by having the crown prince's body lean over his back while he managed to drive his elephant to the back of the lines. No one in Burmese or Siamese command knew of the death, and the battle went on. The battle ended with the Siamese army retreating to Ayutthaya. After the battle, the Burmese command now led by Thado Dhamma Yaza III of Prome realized the death, and they collectively decided to retreat, rather than to attack the city.

==== Siamese accounts ====
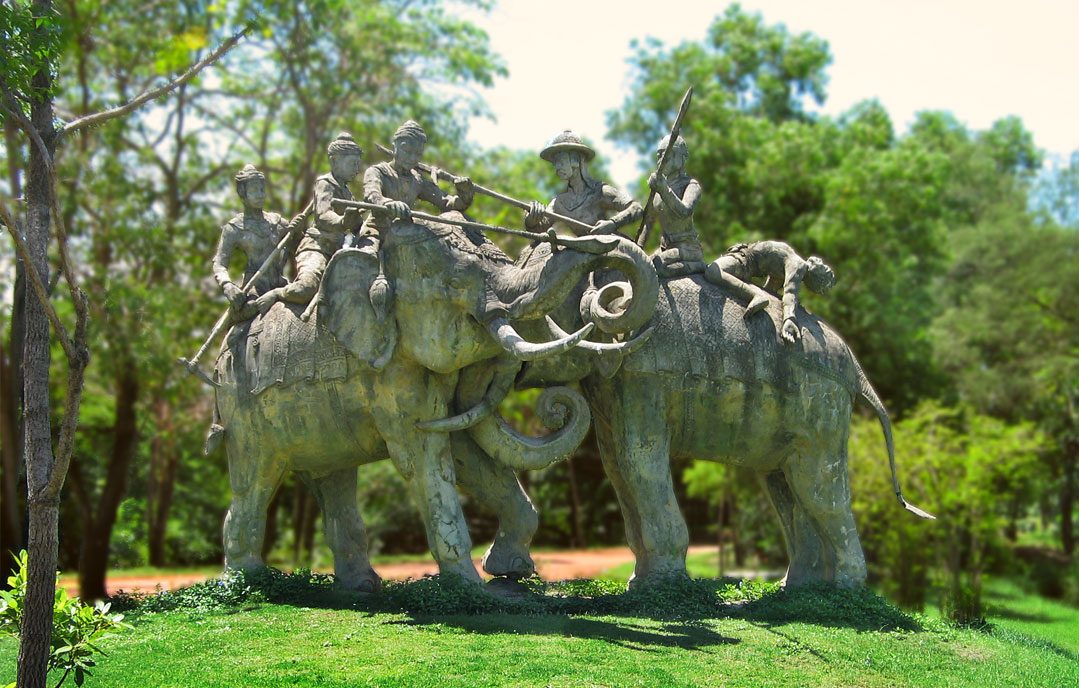
Thai commemoration of single combat between Naresuan and Mingyi Swa at Nong Sarai

There are four different Siamese accounts about the battle. The prevailing Thai history follows the account given in the Ayutthaya chronicle. The prevailing account says that the Burmese army led by Swa had penetrated deep into Siam to a place called Nong Sarai (in present-day Suphan Buri Province.) There, the invaders were met by the Siamese army, led by Naresuan (now king) and his younger brother Crown Prince Ekathotsarot. The two armies fought on 18 January [O.S. 8 January] 1593, (Note: (Damrong 2001: 128): Monday, 2nd waning of the second Siamese month 954 CS = Monday, 18 January 1593 NS.) (ten days later than the Burmese chronicle date).

The Burmese army is said to have won the initial skirmishes, and pressed down on the Siamese vanguard army. Naresuan, Ekathotsarot and their few bodyguards stood their ground and fought on. But because other Siamese vanguard forces fell back, the king and the crown prince came to be surrounded by the Burmese forces. Facing certain death, Naresuan issued a challenge to Mingyi Swa to fight him in single combat on their war elephants. Although his troops had the two top Siamese royals surrounded, Swa, for some reason, accepted the challenge. (The Siamese historian Prince Damrong Rajanubhab's conjecture is that the Burmese crown prince accepted the challenge because of his "kingly pride consistent with his royal birth," and because he was "ashamed not to accept it".) At any rate, the two men and their crews then fought on war elephants. Swa is said to have landed his sword on the helmet of Naresuan. But Naresuan recovered and cut down Swa on the right shoulder, killing Swa on the spot. In the meantime, Ekathotsarot on his elephant also fought with the governor of "Muang Chachro", and killed the governor as well.

The Burmese forces then started shooting, killing Naresuan's front mahout and Ekathotsarot's middle mahout. A bullet even hit the king's hand. But Siamese forces came forward soon enough, and rescued the Siamese king and the crown prince to safety.

However, no other Siamese accounts, including the two earliest Siamese accounts about the battle written in 1647 and 1690, report a formal duel between Naresuan and Swa.

==== Analysis ====
According to BJ Terwiel, there are ten different accounts of the battle by indigenous, European and Persian authors: (four Siamese, one Burmese, four late 16th and early 17th century European accounts and one late 17th century Persian account). Only the Siamese royal chronicle account says there was a formal elephant duel between Naresuan and Swa. Per Terwiel's analysis of the ten accounts, Swa and Naresuan both fought on their war elephant in the battle but no formal duel probably ever took place. According to Terwiel, it is highly unlikely that Swa would have agreed to a formal duel since agreeing to do so would have "jeopardized the costly invasion that had thus far progressed without a hitch." During the battle, Naresuan's elephant got surrounded by the Burmese forces. During that crucial moment, a Burmese war elephant went musth, and attacked Swa's elephant. Seeing that Swa was in difficulty, Naresuan "closed in, and he (or one of the warriors riding with him, maybe a Portuguese) fired a gun which mortally wounded the crown prince Swa. Naresuan was "lucky to escape from a very dangerous situation" but also quick to take advantage of it. According to Terwiel, the "Burmese and European accounts stayed closer to what actually may have happened", and "Naresuan's much repeated challenge to hold a duel, even though it looms large in many Thai history books, should be relegated to a legendary tale."

== Aftermath ==
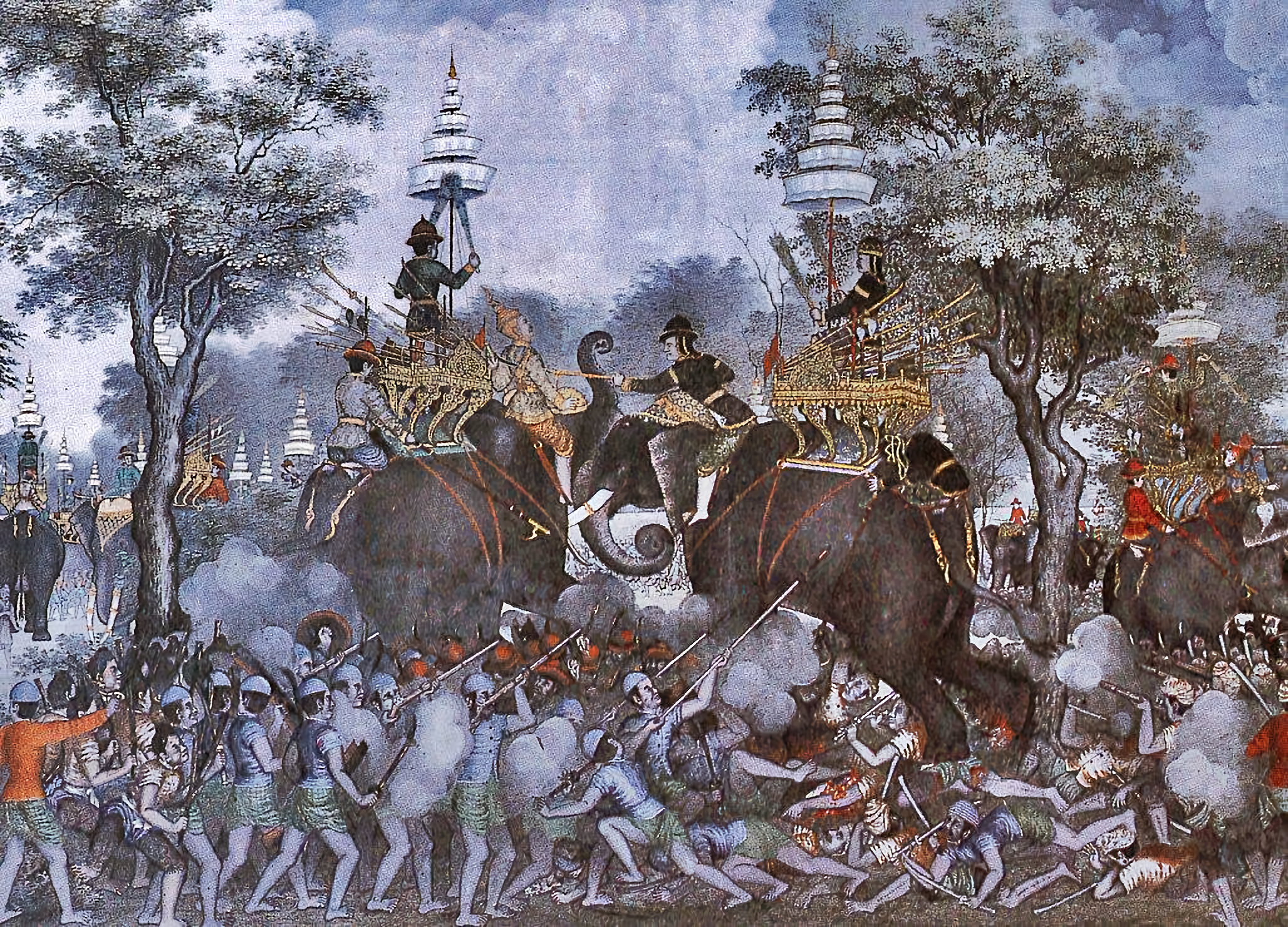

In spite of all the differences, all Burmese and Siamese accounts agree that the two armies fought a battle near Ayutthaya in which Swa fell in action, and that the Burmese forces retreated afterwards. It was the last of Pegu's campaigns in Siam. Siam's independence was now secured. For the next dozen years, it was Burma that would be on the defensive, "the tables of war turning for the first time in 30 years."

Mingyi Swa's body was brought back to Pegu in February 1593. King Nanda is said to have been completely saddened, and gave his eldest son a royal cremation ceremony with highest honors in front of the Kanbawzathadi Palace. The fallen prince was 34. A shaken Nanda waited over nine months before appointing Minye Kyawswa II as the new heir apparent on 29 December [O.S. 19 December] 1593.

== Personal life ==
His first wife was Natshin Medaw, his double cousin and the only child of Viceroy Thado Minsaw of Ava and Inwa Mibaya. She was by his side when he became the crown prince in 1581. According to the chronicles, he spent much of his time pursuing another woman—Princess Yaza Datu Kalaya, who was his half-aunt. (She was a year younger than him, however.) In 1583, Natshin Medaw bitterly complained to her parents, which contributed to a major fallout between her parents and Nanda. The fallout led to the 1584 Ava rebellion.

Swa continued to pursue Yaza Datu Kalaya, and the princess continue to spurn his advances in the following years. The princess was protected by her half-brother Nanda. But in October 1586, Nanda left Pegu with the army for his regime's third invasion of Siam. With his father gone, Swa forcibly raised the princess to be his wife, and formally divorced Natshin Medaw in the process. Nanda arrived back to Pegu in June 1587 from a failed campaign, and the king was extremely unhappy to learn of the news what had happened while he was away. Nanda nonetheless did not break up the marriage. Kalaya remained Swa's chief wife to his death.

== In popular culture ==
he was portrayed as a character in Thai television drama and movies, King Naresuan portrayed by Napatsakorn Mitr-em, Kasattriya (กษัตริยา) 2003 portrayed by Apichat Puapimon., Thai television drama KhunSeuk (ขุนศึก) in 2012 portrayed by Adisorn Atthakrit.,The Legend of King Naresuan: The Series portrayed by Korapat Kirdpan in teenager - Show in season 1 only and Aungoont Thanasapchroen (teenager - Show in season 2 onwards)., and the mini-series The Last Duel in 2026 portrayed by Naphat Siangsomboon.

== Bibliography ==
- Aung-Thwin, Michael A.; Aung-Thwin, Maitrii (2012). A History of Myanmar Since Ancient Times (illustrated ed.). Honolulu: University of Hawai'i Press. ISBN 978-1-86189-901-9.
- Prince Damrong Rajanubhab (2001) [1928]. Chris Baker (ed.). Our Wars with the Burmese: Thai–Burmese Conflict 1539–1767. Translated by Aung Thein. Bangkok: White Lotus. ISBN 974-7534-58-4.
- Harvey, G. E. (1925). History of Burma: From the Earliest Times to 10 March 1824. London: Frank Cass & Co. Ltd.
- Htin Aung, Maung (1967). A History of Burma. New York and London: Cambridge University Press.
- Kala, U (2006) [1724]. Maha Yazawin (in Burmese). Vol. 1–3 (4th printing ed.). Yangon: Ya-Pyei Publishing.
- Lieberman, Victor B. (2003). Strange Parallels: Southeast Asia in Global Context, c. 800–1830, volume 1, Integration on the Mainland. Cambridge University Press. ISBN 978-0-521-80496-7.
- Ohn Shwe, U; Natshinnaung (1966) [1920]. Natshinnaung Yadu Collection (in Burmese) (3rd printing ed.). Yangon: Hanthawaddy.
- Phayre, Lt. Gen. Sir Arthur P. (1967) [1883]. History of Burma. London: Susil Gupta.
- Ratchasomphan (Sænluang.) (1994). Wyatt, David K. (ed.). The Nan Chronicle. SEAP Publications. ISBN 9780877277156.
- Royal Historical Commission of Burma (2003) [1832]. Hmannan Yazawin (in Burmese). Vol. 1–3. Yangon: Ministry of Information, Myanmar.
- Terwiel, Barend Jan (2013). "What Happened at Nong Sarai? Comparing Indigenous and European Sources for Late 16th Century Siam". Journal of the Siam Society. 101.
- Wyatt, David K.; Aroonrut, Wichienkeeo, eds. (1998). The Chiang Mai Chronicle (illustrated ed.). Silk Worms Books. ISBN 978-9747100624.
- Wyatt, David K. (2003). Thailand: A Short History (2 ed.). Yale University Press. ISBN 978-0-300-08475-7.

Mingyi Swa Toungoo Dynasty Born: 27 November 1558 Died: 8 January 1593
Royal titles
Preceded by Nanda	Heir Apparent of Burma; 15 October 1581 – 8 January 1593	Succeeded by Minye Kyawswa II
