= MONOMAX Sports =

- Logo used from June 1, 2026
- Country: Thailand
- Broadcast area: Southeast Asia
- Headquarters: Bangkok, Thailand

Programming
- Language: Thai
- Picture format: 576i (SDTV) 16:9; 1080i (HDTV) 16:9

Ownership
- Owner: MONO Next
- Sister channels: MONO Plus; MONO Max; MONO29 Music Station

History
- Launched: Terrestrial digital: 25 April 2014; 12 years ago Satellite and digital: 2 December 2015; 10 years ago

Links
- Website: monomaxsports.tv

Availability

Terrestrial
- Digital: Channel 29 (SD)

Streaming media
- Affiliated Streaming Service: MONOMAX (Note: Requires subscription)

MONOMAX Sports is a digital terrestrial television and satellite television channel in Thailand owned by MONO Next, a media and technology giant in Thailand.

== History ==
MONO29 was established in 2013 by Mono Broadcast Co., Ltd., a subsidiary of Mono Next, to start digital terrestrial television business. Mono Broadcast participated in the digital TV auction during December 26 to 27, 2013, and received a license to use frequencies for digital television services, national business service category, general category, standard definition (SD), with a bid of 2,250 million baht, ranking 6th in the category out of 7 channels.

MONO29 began trial broadcasting on April 25, 2014, and established its own distinctive highlights compared to other television channels by focusing on broadcasting serial dramas and famous movies that generated the highest revenue at that time, including films produced and released in Thailand. This also included films produced by T Moment, a company in the same network as Mono 29, as well as films licensed from abroad through distribution by major global production companies such as Warner Bros., NBC Universal, Paramount Pictures, and more. According to the channel's slogan, it is "The free TV that have good movies, popular series the most." and it also includes the channel number in the channel name to help viewers remember the number more accurately. With this strategy, Mono 29 has become another option for movie viewers nationwide comparable to Netflix, resulting in its ratings rising to the 3rd place in digital TV up to the present. Due to the channel's success in terms of ratings, MONO29 has then planned to become the highest-rated television station in Thailand in the future.

In addition, Mono Next, the parent company of MONO29, also has a policy to promote basketball in Thailand. Therefore, MONO29 has been dedicated to presenting basketball in depth, being the only channel in Thailand to do so. For example, it has purchased the broadcasting rights for the NBA and airs it live, as well as supporting the Thai national basketball team and broadcasting every match of the Thai national basketball team in all competitions. As a result of this change in target audience, Mono Next decided to officially rename the channel to "MONOMAX Sports" on May 15, 2026, with the name change taking effect from June 1, 2026, at 12:00 a.m. onwards. In addition to the channel name change, "MONOMAX Sports" will also shift its main target audience from entertainment and movies to sports.

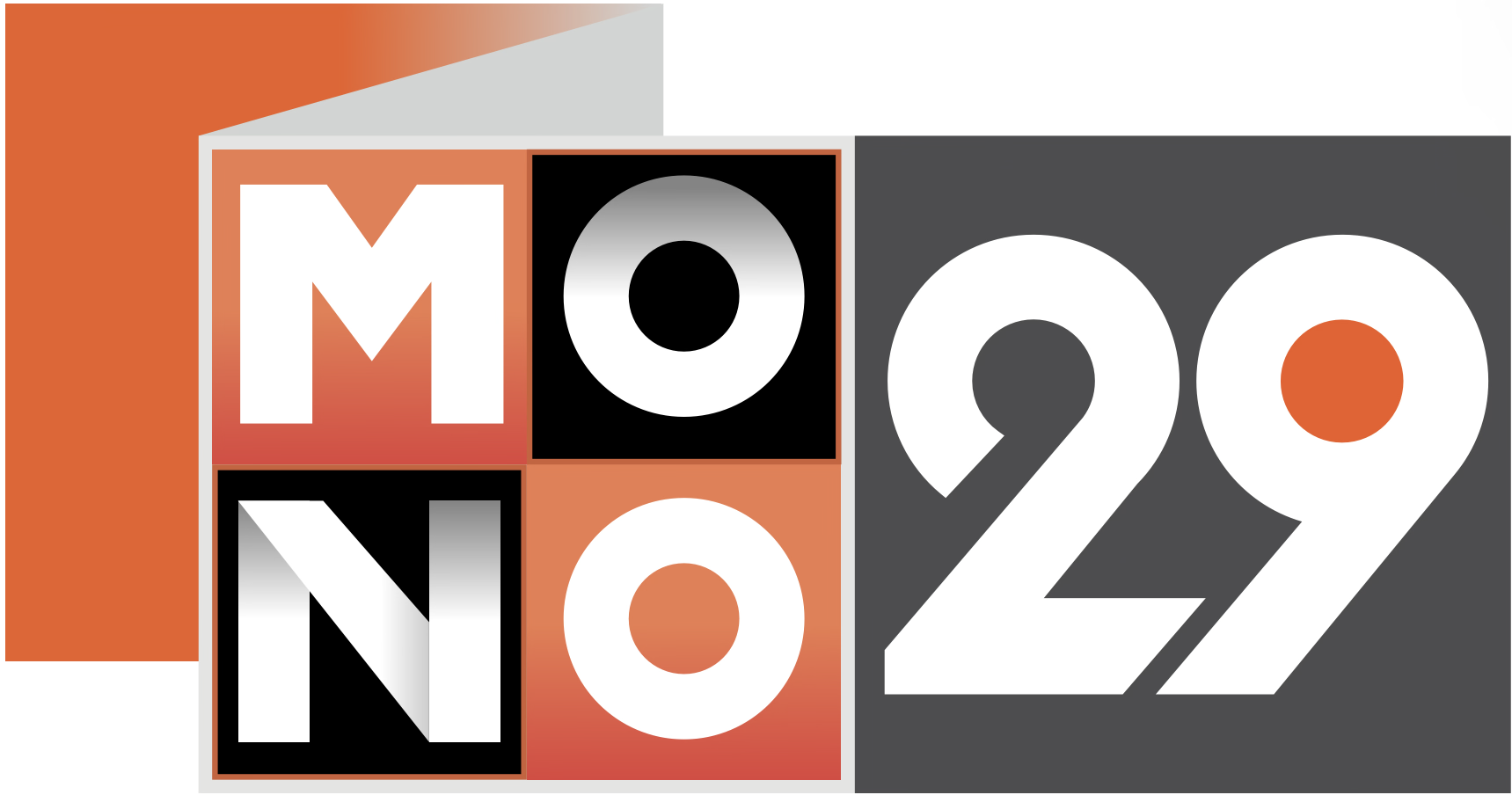
Logo used from June 6, 2025 - June 1, 2026

== Presenters ==
=== Current ===
- Ampika Chuanpreecha
- Piyalak Rakpratanporn
- Phakaphong Udomkalayalux
- Tawanrung Parisuttidham
- Nonthakrit Klomklorm
- Pobek Pornpongmetta
- Rinnatha Atchariyawattanakul
- Chonnatee Aksornsingchai
- Preenapa Kanchanarat
- Phacharawan Wadrakchit
- Naphat Banjongjitpaisarn
- Sawanya Leangprasit
- Matika Tosom
- Thanat Thanajirachai
- Patcharanit To

=== Former ===
- Banphot Thanapermsuk (now at TNN16)
- Pipoauh Poomkaewkla (now at Nation TV)
- Pichayapa Sutabutra (now at TNN16)
- Nattee Kosolpisit
