= Family of Bayinnaung =

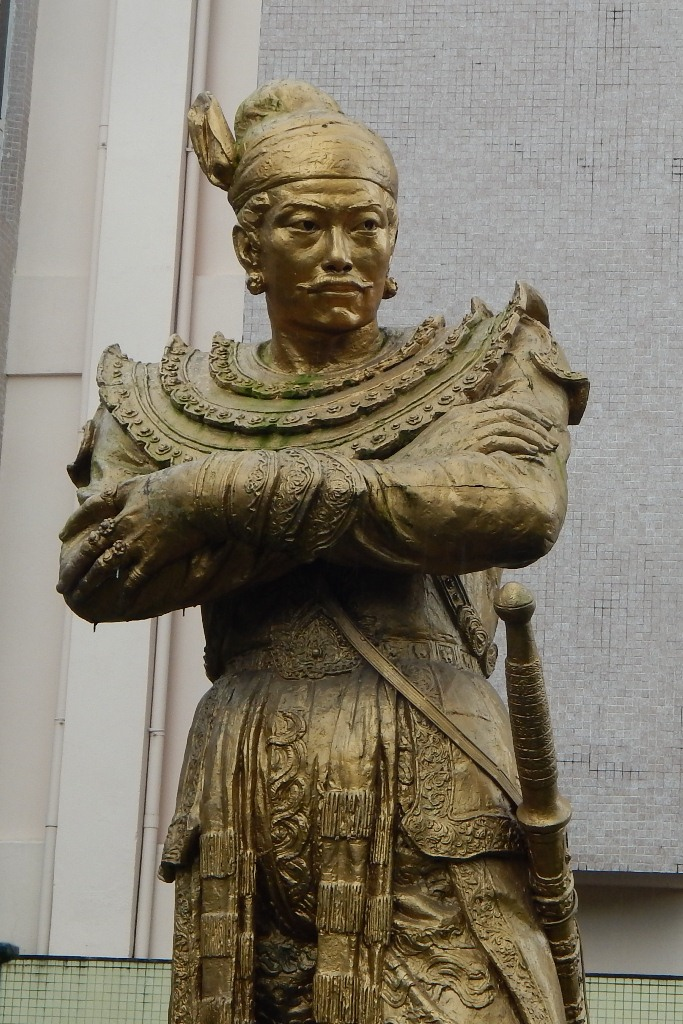
- Statue of Bayinnaung in Yangon
- Origin: Upper Burma, Lower Burma, Shan states, Chinese Shan states, Siam, Lan Na, Lan Xang, Manipur
- Members: Mingyi Swe; Atula Thiri; Sanda Dewi; Yaza Dewi; Nanda; Nawrahta Minsaw; Nyaungyan; Anaukpetlun; Natshinnaung; Thalun
- Connected families: House of Toungoo, House of Hanthawaddy, House of Phitsanulok, House of Saw Mon

These are the lists related to the Family of Emperor Bayinnaung of the Toungoo Dynasty of Burma. The king had over 50 wives and nearly 100 children. All the Toungoo monarchs after him were descended from him.

== Ancestry ==
His ancestry is unclear. The chronicles claim that he was of royal ancestry (from all the previous main Upper Burma dynasties) while oral traditions say he was of commoner origins.

Family tree of King Bayinnaung according to Maha Yazawin

Tarabya I of Pakhan c. d. 1433	Minkhaung I of Ava; 1373–1421 r. 1400–1421	Shin Mi-Nauk of Mohnyin	Thihathu of Pinya; 1265–1325 r. 1310–1325	Mi Saw U of Pagan
Tarabya of Toungoo d. 1446	Saw Min Hla	Minye Kyawswa; 1391–1415	Nawrahta of Kanni b. c. 1300s	Uzana I of Pinya; 1298–1356 r. 1325–1340	Kyawswa I of Pinya; 1299–1350 r. 1344–1350
Minkhaung I of Toungoo d. 1451	Thettawshay of Dabayin
Unnamed	Thray Ponnya
Kayenawaddy	Taungkha Min	Kywe Sit Min
Mingyi Swe c. 1490s–1549	Shin Myo Myat c. 1490s–1520s
Bayinnaung; 1516–1581 r. 1550–1581

== Queens consort ==
=== Principal queens ===
Bayinnaung had three queens consort. After the death of his first chief queen Atula Thiri in 1568, Sanda Dewi became the chief and only queen for the remainder of his reign (1568–81).

#	Name	Rank	Date of marriage	Issue
1.	Atula Thiri Maha Yaza Dewi	Chief Queen (1550–68)	April 1534	1. Inwa Mibaya; 2. Nanda
2.	Sanda Dewi	Chief queen (1568–81); Senior queen (1553–68)	April 1553	1. Min Khin Saw
3.	Yaza Dewi	Senior queen (1563–64); Junior queen (1550–63)	c. 1550	1. Nawrahta Minsaw; 2. Yaza Datu Kalaya; 3. Thiri Thudhamma Yaza

=== Junior queens ===
The following is a list of junior queens who bore him at least one child per the Hmannan Yazawin chronicle (Hmannan Vol. 3 2003: 68–73). Several of the queens came over through marriages of state.

#	Name	Brief	Date of marriage	Issue
1.	Khin Pyezon aka Ne Ein Thein	2 sons	c. 1552	1. Shin Ubote (son); 2. Nyaungyan
2.	Shin Lat I	Daughter of Letwe Khon-Thu; 1 son		1. Shin Nan Myint (son)
3.	Shin Lat II	Personal name: Champawaddy the daughter of Reami Dipati and the niece of the daughter of Ang Chan I King of Longvek 3 sons and 4 daughters		1. Unnamed son (died young); 2. Thilawaddy; 3. Sanda Dewi (daughter); 4. Aniruddhi Taya (son); 5. Kaweya Hla Oo (daughter); 6. Yusiyawatta; 7. Thila Ginga (son)
4.	Khin Htwe I	Daughter of Letya Nan-Thu; 3 sons, 2 daughters		1. Khin Myat Lay; 2. Shin Myat Tan (son); 3. Okkasara (son); 4. Thiri Yadana; 5. Nara Thiha (son)
5.	Khin Saw I	2 sons, 4 daughters		1. Myat In Phyo (daughter); 2. Thiha Kyawhtin (son); 3. Thuganda Kalaya (daughter); 4. Minye Nawrahta of Lan Na (Thiha Kyawthu) (son); 5. Khin Hla (daughter); 6. Hnaung Myin Hpone Shi (daughter)
6.	Khin Pu	Personal name : Sao Nang Yi Hkam Hkong the daughter of Hso Hkoen Hpa the saopha of Hsipaw and the Elder sister of Thukha Hsaya; 3 daughters		1. Khin Hpone Shi (daughter); 2. Khin Kaung (daughter); 3. Manithala (daughter)
7.	Khin Myo Htut aka Htip Khine Hkan Sawn	Daughter of Sao Möng Hkam, retinue of Sanda Dewi from Prome; 2 sons	April 1553	1. Shin Aung Kyaw (son); 2. Shin Htwe Kyaing (son)
8.	Khin Chan	Daughter of Narapati of Prome, retinue of Sanda Dewi from Prome; 1 daughter	April 1553	1. Thiri Sanda (daughter)
9.	Khin Htwe II	Daughter of Sao Sui Kwei the saopha of Mogaung; 1 daughter	c. March 1557	1. Khin Hpone Si (daughter)
10.	Sanda Thukha	Personal name: Narathein; 1 son, 3 daughters		1. Minye Aung Naing (son); 2. Khin Gyi (daughter); 3. Khin Lat; 4. Min Shwe-Khe (daughter)
11.	Shin Mi Myat	Also known as Thagya Thami; 1 son, 2 daughters		1. Utamayas (son); 2. Manawha (daughter); 3. Hnin Hnaung Htwe Myat (daughter)
12.	Khin Min Phyu	Younger sister of Thagya Set; 1 son, 3 daughters		1. Khin Min Myat (daughter); 2. Shin Myat Lay (son); 3. Khin Hpone San (daughter); 4. Unnamed daughter (died young)
13.	Khin Gyi	Daughter of Min Maha of Yamethin; 1 son		1. Bodaw Ba Khin (son)
14.	Zinyon Minthami Gyi	Personal name: Thiri Thukhantha, (Sri Sukhantha) the daughter of King Oun Moeng the saopha of Chiang Rung with Maha Dewi Min Hla; 1 daughter	c. 1558	1. Yadana Nyunt Thit (daughter)
15.	Sanda Yathi	Personal name: Khin Ne the elder daughter of Min Taya Gyi of Yesagyo; 2 daughters		1. Khin Myit (daughter); 2. Saw Ne Htwe (daughter)
16.	Mani Thayi	Personal name: Khin Ne Yun the younger daughter of Min Taya Gyi of Yesagyo; 1 daughter		1. Ne Thila (daughter)
17.	Khin Gyi Min	Personal name: Manurah the daughter of Aung Naing Lu Kyaw King of Ayutthaya Kingdom; 1 son		1. Yodaya Naing (son)
18.	Khin Gyi Sit	Daughter of Letya Thura; 1 son, 2 daughters		1. Khin Hpone Myat (daughter); 2. Thiha Kyaw (son); 3. Pyinsa Kalaya (daughter)
19.	Thudhammas	Daughter of Thao Hkam Fu the saopha of Chiang Tung (send from Lan Xang); 1 son, 1 daughter	c. 1565	1. Awrat (son); 2. Yaza Kalaya (daughter)
20.	Khin Lat	1 son, 2 daughters		1. Myat San Paw (son); 2. Eka Kalaya (daughter); 3. daughter (died young)
21.	Kywepauk Kadaw	1 daughter		1. Khin Mi-Ya (daughter)
22.	Khin Ne Thauk	Personal name: Princess Thau Hook the daughter of Sen Soulintha King of Lan Xang; 1 daughter		1. Yadana Sagga (daughter)
23.	Khin Hpone Gyi	3 sons		1. Wara Thiha (son); 2. Nara Dhamma (son); 3. Agga Dathta (son)
24.	Khin Aung Kham	Daughter of Hso Kaw Hpa the saopha of Mongpai the King Narapati III of Ava; 1 daughter		1. Yadana In-Su (daughter)
25.	Khin Myat San	Personal name: Mani San Hpa the daughter of Hso Hom Hpa the saopha of Mogaung; 2 daughters		1. Arenawaddy (daughter); 2. Kinzanawaddy (daughter)
26.	Khin Hnin Nwe	Personal name: Keo Kumari the daughter of King Photisarath of Lan Xang; 1 son		1. Shin Myat Kyaw (son)
27.	Khin Shwe Pan	Personal name: Sao Nang Suriya Vivamsa aka Sao Shin Mawk the daughter of Hso Sawk Hpa the saopha of Mong Maw; 1 son		1. Upasanda (son)
28.	Khin Htwe Nyo	1 daughter		1. Soe Min Myat Hla (daughter)
29.	Khin Saw II	Daughter of Min Maha of Yamethin; 1 daughter		1. Khin Chit Myat (daughter)
30.	Nyaungshwe Minthami	Personal name: Sao Nang Varma Kantha the daughter of Sao Maw Hkam the saopha of Yawnghwe; 1 daughter		1. Hpone Myo Myat Hla (daughter)
31.	Yo-Mya-Ong-Kone	Personal name: Princess Kosoummas from Ramarak Ongkarn the daughter of Soma Rihti, Governor of Ramarak Ongkarn in Lan Xang and ex-queen of Setthathirath King of Lan Xang; 1 daughter		1. Hpone Myo Myat (daughter)
32.	Zinyon Minthami Nge	Personal name: Sao Nang Inn Lao Hpa the daughter of King Inn Moeng the saopha of Chiang Rung; 1 son	22 January 1567	1. Komma Kyawthu (son)
33.	Gon Minthami	Personal name: Sao Nang Gon Hkam the daughter of Sao Keo Boun Nam the saopha of Chiang Tung; 1 son	16 November 1562	1. Unnamed (died young); 2. Narazeya (son)
34.	Akyaw Minthami (personal name : Si Phai)	Daughter of Lord of Akyaw (personal name : Sao Sawn Hkam); 1 son		1. Thudathta (son)
35.	Thukha Hsaya	Daughter of Hso Saw Hpa the saopha of Hsipaw and the cousin of Khin Pu (Personal name : Sao Nang Yi Hkam Hkong); 1 daughter		1. Khin Win Hson (daughter)
36.	Khin Hpone Htut	Daughter of Shan-Paik Htaung Hmu, the uncle of Khin Oo who are the King Tabinshwehti's mother 1 daughter		1. Unnamed daughter (died young)
37.	Khin Htwe Hla	Niece of Thado Dhamma Yaza I of Prome; 1 son, 1 daughter		1. Phyo Hpone Wai (daughter); 2. Eka Thura (son)
38.	Khin Moe Shwe	The younger daughter of Shan-Paik Htaung Hmu, the uncle of Khin Oo who are the King Tabinshwehti's mother 3 daughters		1. Min Hla (daughter); 2. Myat Hpone Wai (daughter); 3. Unnamed daughter (died young)
39.	Khin Htwe Phyu	Daughter of Yaza Theinzi; 1 daughter		1. Khin Hpone Myat (daughter)
40.	Amyoyon	Daughter of King Maha Thammarachathirat of Ayutthaya Kingdom; 1 daughter	22 January 1567	1. Saw Hpone Shi (Min A-Htwe) (daughter)
41.	Khin San Paw	1 daughter		1. Khaymawaddy (daughter)
42.	Khin Kauk	Personal name: Khay Kham the daughter of Thao Sai Kham King of Chiang Mai; 1 daughter		1. Yaza Meitta (daughter)
43.	Khin Hpone Htut	Daughter of Yaza Thingyan; 1 son		1. Shin Pyit-Sunt (son)
44.	Khin Saw III	Taken to Arakan in 1600; 1 daughter		1. Khin Hpone Nyo (daughter)
45.	Shin Htwe Myat	1 daughter	c. 1553	1. Khin Hpone Myint (daughter)

Below are other junior wives who appeared elsewhere in the chronicles. They have to account for the king's children (Wara Dhamma, Kaweya Hla Nyi, Thukhawaddy, Min A-Kyi, Thugandawaddy, Myat Myo Hpone Wai and Myo Myat Hpone Si) whose mothers' names are unknown.

#	Name	Brief	Date of Marriage	Issue
46.	Mainglon Minthami	Personal name: Sao Nang Mani Ampha the daughter of Hkam Ai Sunt the Hkonmaing of Mainglon, and great granddaughter of Hkonmaing I of Onbaung–Hsipaw)	December 1556 (Note: (Maha Yazawin Vol. 2 2006: 232): Mainglon sawbwa submitted and presented his daughter (along with other gifts) right before Bayinnaung was about to the campaign to the Shan states, which began on 24 December 1556.)	1. None
47.	Momeik Minthami	Personal name: Sao Nang Keo Sit Mala Hti the daughter of Hso Hsong Hpa the saopha of Momeik	15 November 1559	1. None
48.	Kathe Minthami	Personal name: Lig Nga Lembi the daughter of King Chalampa raja of Manipur	27 May 1560	1. Thukha Sanda Kalaya (daughter)
49.	Sao Nang Hkam Nan	Daughter of Hkam Harn Hpa the Thinwibwa the saopha of Hsenwi	c. 2 January 1561 (Note: (Maha Yazawin Vol. 2 2006: 259): married soon after 2nd waning of Pyatho 922 ME (2 January 1561))	None
50.	Theinni Minthami	Personal name: Sao Nang Hkam Hkoe Hpa; Daughter of Hkam Pak Hpa the saopha of Hsenwi	22 January 1567	1. Khame Myet-Hna, (son)
51.	Theingo Minthami	Personal name : Alingouse the daughter of King Dharmapala of Kotte	24 September 1573	1. Aethennawaddy, (daughter)
52.	Nang Yon Thit	Daughter of Hkam Phing Hpa the saopha of Gengma in Yunnan		1. Mukthawaddy Thit (daughter)
53.	Princess Moha Tevi	Daughter of Ang Chan I King of Longvek		1. Kaweya Hla Nyi (daughter)

== Issue ==
=== By senior queens ===
The king had three daughters and three sons by his senior queens.

#	Name	Mother	Brief
1.	Min Taya Waddy	Atula Thiri	Queen consort of Ava (r. 1555–84)
2.	Zeya Thiha	Atula Thiri	King of Burma (r. 1581–99)
3.	Min Tha Sit	Yaza Dewi	King of Lan Na (r. 1579–1607)
4.	Min Khin Saw	Sanda Dewi	Queen consort of Toungoo (r. 1584–1609)
5.	Yaza Datu Kalaya	Yaza Dewi	Princess consort of the Crown Prince of Burma (r. 1586–93); Princess consort of the Crown Prince of Toungoo (r. 1603)
6.	Thinga Dathta	Yaza Dewi	Viceroy of Martaban (r. 1581–84)

=== By junior queens ===
The following is a list of his children by junior queens. The list is ordered by the mother of the children, and then by the age of the children per the Hmannan Yazawin chronicle. Note that although both Maha Yazawin and Hmannan chronicles say that he had 35 sons and 56 daughters by junior queens and concubines, the detailed list, which appears only in Hmannan (Hmannan Vol. 3 2003: 68–73), enumerates only 86 children (32 sons, 54 daughters). The rest of the children are mentioned in the various parts of the chronicles. The grand total comes to at least 92 different names which consisted of 33 sons and 59 daughters. The discrepancy may be due to recording errors in the sex and/or number of the unnamed children who died young.

#	Name	Mother	Brief
1.	Shin Ubote	Khin Pyezon aka Ne Ein Thein	Son Governor of Nyaungyan (1574–81); Married to half-sister Nè Thila; Died January 1581
2.	Shin Thissa	Khin Pyezon aka Ne Ein Thein	Son King of Burma (r. 1599–1605)
3.	Shin Nan Myint	Shin Lat I, the daughter of Letwe Khon-Thu	Son Governor of Taungdwin (1574–99?) married to half-sister Thilawaddy
4.	unnamed son	Shin Lat II (b) Champawaddy, the daughter of Reami Dipati and the niece of Ang Chan I King of Longvek	Died young
5.	Thilawaddy	Shin Lat II (b) Champawaddy, the daughter of Reami Dipati and the niece of Ang Chan I King of Longvek	Daughter married to half-brother Shin Nan Myint, Gov. of Taungdwin
6.	Sanda Dewi	Shin Lat II (b) Champawaddy, the daughter of Reami Dipati and the niece of Ang Chan I King of Longvek	Daughter
7.	Aniruddhi Taya	Shin Lat II (b) Champawaddy, the daughter of Reami Dipati and the niece of Ang Chan I King of Longvek	Son Governor of Zeyawaddy m. to half-sister Khin Kaung deported to Arakan in 1600
8.	Kaweya Hla Oo	Shin Lat II (b) Champawaddy, the daughter of Reami Dipati and the niece of Ang Chan I King of Longvek	Daughter married to King Naresuan of Ayutthaya
9.	Yusiyawatta	Shin Lat II (b) Champawaddy, the daughter of Reami Dipati and the niece of Ang Chan I King of Longvek	Daughter married to half brother Shin Pyit-Sunt
10.	Thila Ginga	Shin Lat II (b) Champawaddy, the daughter of Reami Dipati and the niece of Ang Chan I King of Longvek	Son
11.	Khin Myat Lay	Khin Htwe I, the daughter of Letya Nan-Thu	Daughter, died at age 8 (9th year)
12.	Shin Myat Tan (Shin Myat Lay)	Khin Htwe I, the daughter of Letya Nan-Thu	Son Governor of Yamethin
13.	Okkasara	Khin Htwe I, the daughter of Letya Nan-Thu	Son
14.	Thiri Yadana	Khin Htwe I, the daughter of Letya Nan-Thu	Daughter
15.	Nara Thiha	Khin Htwe I, the daughter of Letya Nan-Thu	Son
16.	Myat In-Phyo	Khin Saw I	Daughter married to half-brother Shin Myat Lay, Governor of Yamethin
17.	Thiha Kyawhtin	Khin Saw I	Son married to half-sister Khin Hpone Si
18.	Thuganda Kalaya	Khin Saw I	Daughter married to Thigamari
19.	Thiha Kyawthu	Khin Saw I	Son Governor of Bayaung in Lan Na with title Minye Nawrahta
20.	Khin Hla	Khin Saw I	Daughter
21.	Hnaung Myint Hpone Shi	Khin Saw I	Daughter
22.	Khin Hpone Shi	Khin Pu (b) Sao Nang Yi Hkam Hkong, the daughter of Hso Hkoen Hpa the saopha of Hsipaw	Daughter married to Governor of Kawliya
23.	Khin Kaung	Khin Pu (b) Sao Nang Yi Hkam Hkong, the daughter of Hso Hkoen Hpa the saopha of Hsipaw	Daughter married to half brother Aniruddhi Taya, Governor of Zeyawaddy
24.	Manithala	Khin Pu (b) Sao Nang Yi Hkam Hkong, the daughter of Hso Hkoen Hpa the saopha of Hsipaw	Daughter married to Minye Kyawswa II of Ava
25.	Shin Aung Kyaw	Khin Myo Htut (Htip Khine Hkan Sawn), the daughter of Sao Möng Hkam, retinue of Sanda Dewi from Prome	Son Governor of Salay during the reigns of Bayinnaung and Nanda; Governor of Pagan with the title of Thiri Dhammathawka during the reign of Nyaungyan married to half-sister Thiri Sanda
26.	Shin Htwe Kyaing	Khin Myo Htut (Htip Khine Hkan Sawn), the daughter of Sao Möng Hkam, retinue of Sanda Dewi from Prome	Son Governor of Kun-Ohn; later Gov. of Myede sent to Arakan in 1600; received the title Minye Nandameit in Arakan married to daughter of Thado Dhamma Yaza II of Prome married half-sister Khin Hpone Si, widow of Thiha Kyawhtin, in Arakan
27.	Thiri Sanda	Khin Chan	Daughter married to half-brother Shin Aung Kyaw, Governor of Salay
28.	Khin Hpone Si	Khin Htwe II, the daughter of Sao Sui Kwei the saopha of Mogaung	Daughter married to half-brother Thiha Kyawhtin sent to Arakan in 1600; married half-brother Shin Htwe Kyaing there
29.	Minye Aung Naing	Sanda Thukha (Narathein)	Son Governor of Legaing
30.	Khin Gyi	Sanda Thukha (Narathein)	Daughter married to Nandameit, Governor of Kyauktaw
31.	Khin Lat	Sanda Thukha (Narathein)	Daughter married to Baya Zeya
32.	Min Shwe-Khe	Sanda Thukha (Narathein)	Daughter married to King Inn Moeng the saopha of Chiang Rung
33.	Utamayas	Shin Mi Myat (Thagya Thami), the daughter of Thagya Set	Son Governor of Sagaing married to half-sister Khin Hpone Myat II in 1574
34.	Manawha	Shin Mi Myat (Thagya Thami), the daughter of Thagya Set	Daughter married to half-brother Shin Myat Lay, Governor of Sampanago
35.	Hnin Hnaung Htwe Myat	Shin Mi Myat (Thagya Thami), the daughter of Thagya Set	Daughter married to Minye Kyawswa of Toungoo
36.	Khin Min Myat	Khin Min Phyu, the younger sister of Thagya Set	Daughter married to half-brother Minye Aung Naing
37.	Shin Myat Lay	Khin Min Phyu, the younger sister of Thagya Set	Son Governor of Sampanago or Wanmaw m. to half-sister Manawha
38.	Khin Hpone San	Khin Min Phyu, the younger sister of Thagya Set	Daughter married to Minye Kyawswa of Toungoo
39.	unnamed daughter	Khin Min Phyu, the younger sister of Thagya Set	Died young
40.	Bodaw Ba Khin	Khin Gyi, the daughter of Min Maha of Yamethin	Son Governor of Yamethin m. to half-sister Kaweya Hla Nyi
41.	Yadana Nyunt Thit	Zinyon Minthami Gyi (b) Thiri Thukhantha or Sri Sukhantha, the daughter of King Oun Moeng the saopha of Chiang Rung with Maha Dewi Min Hla	Daughter married to her half-brother King Nanda Bayin
42.	Khin Myit (Khin Hpone Myint)	Sanda Yathi, the elder daughter of Min Taya Gyi of Yesagyo	Daughter married to Nandameit, son of Governor of Wingapu (or Wuttaku)
43.	Saw Ne Htwe	Sanda Yathi, the elder daughter Min Taya Gyi of Yesagyo	Daughter married to her half-nephew Min Mon, son of her half-brother Shin Nan Myint, Governor of Taungdwin
44.	Nè Thila	Manithayi, the younger daughter of Min Taya Gyi of Yesagyo	Daughter married to half-brother Shin Ubote, Governor of Nyaungyan
45.	Yodaya Naing	Khin Mi Min (b) Manurah, the daughter of the winner who enthronment (Aung Naing Lu Kyaw of Ayutthaya Kingdom)	Son Atthama (cavalry) who yell the signal Theik Sone Shwe Kyaing (တက်စုံရွှေကျိုင်း) Governor of Kyaukse
46.	Khin Hpone Myat I (Khin Hpone Thit)	Khin Gyi Sit, the daughter of Letya Thura	Daughter married to Sithu, Governor of Myaungmya and son of Thinkhaya of Yesagyo
47.	Thiha Kyaw	Khin Gyi Sit, the daughter of Letya Thura	Son Governor of Danubyu
48.	Pyinsa Kalaya	Khin Gyi Sit, the daughter of Letya Thura	Daughter married to Nanda Kyawthu, Governor of Sula and son of Thinkhaya of Bagan
49.	Awrat	Thudhammas, the daughter of Thao Hkam Fu the saopha of Chiang Tung (send from Lan Xang)	Son Governor of Shwedaung
50.	Yaza Kalaya	Thudhammas, the daughter of Thao Hkam Fu the saopha of Chiang Tung (send from Lan Xang)	Daughter
51.	Myat San Paw	Khin Lat	Son Governor of Hlaing-Tet married to half-sister Khin Mi-Ya
52.	Eka Kalaya	Khin Lat	Daughter married to Letya Zala Thingyan, Governor of Kyet-Tha
53.	unnamed daughter	Khin Lat	Died young
54.	Khin Mi Ya	Kywepauk Kadaw Khin Chan	Daughter married to half-brother Myat San Paw, Governor of Hlaing-Tet
55.	Yadana In Thaga	Khin Ne Thauk (b) Princess Thau Hook, the daughter of Sen Soulintha the King of Lan Xang	Daughter
56.	Wara Thiha	Khin Hpone Gyi	Son
57.	Nara Dhamma	Khin Hpone Gyi	Son
58.	Agga Dathta	Khin Hpone Gyi	Son
59.	Yadana In-Su	Khin Aung Kham, the daughter of Sao Hso Kaw Hpa the saopha of Mong Pai the King Mobye Narapati of Ava	Daughter married to King Naresuan of Ayutthaya
60.	Kayenawaddy	Khin Myat San (b) Sao Nang Mani San Hpa, the daughter of Hso Hom Hpa the saopha of Mogaung	Daughter married to King Naresuan of Ayutthaya
61.	Kinzanawaddy	Khin Myat San (b) Sao Nang Mani San Hpa, the daughter of Hso Hom Hpa the saopha of Mogaung	Daughter married to King Naresuan of Ayutthaya
62.	Shin Myat Kyaw	Khin Hnin Nwe (b) Keo Kumari, the daughter of King Photisarath of Lan Xang	Son Governor of Maing Thant
63.	Upasanda	Khin Shwe Pan (b) Sao Nang Suriya Vivamsa aka Sao Shin Mawk, the daughter of Hso Sawt Hpa the saopha of Mong Maw	Son Governor of Bagan with the title of Nawrahta in the reign of Anaukpetlun married to half-sister Hpone Myo Myat Hla
64.	Soe Min Myat Hla	Khin Htwe Nyo	Daughter married to 1st cousin Pyinsa Thiha, Gov. of Tayotmaw and son of Thado Dhamma Yaza II of Pyay
65.	Khin Chit Myat	Khin Saw II, the daughter of Min Maha of Yamethin	Daughter married to half-nephew Min Thiha, son of Governor of Taungdwin; Min Thiha later became Minye Uzana, Governor of Mabe in the reign of Thalun
66.	Hpone Myo Myat Hla	Nyaungshwe Minthami (b) Sao Nang Varma Kantha, the daughter of Sao Maw Hkam the saopha of Yawnghwe	Daughter married to half-brother Upasanda
67.	Hpone Myo Myat	Yo-A-Yo-A-Sone ရိုအရိုအစုံ (Ramarak Ongkarn) Princess Kosoummas, the daughter of Soma Rihti, Governor of Ramarak Ongkarn in Lan Xang and ex-queen of Setthathirath the King of Lan Xang	Daughter
68.	Komma Kyawthu	Zinyon Minthami Nge (b) Sao Nang Inn Lao Hpa, the daughter of King Inn Moeng the saopha of Chiang Rung	Son Governor of Vieng Phoukha in Nanda Bayin's reign
69.	unnamed son	Gon Minthami (b) Sao Nang Gon Hkam, the daughter of Sao Keo Boun Nam the saopha of Chiang Tung	Died young
70.	Narazeya	Gon Minthami (b) Sao Nang Gon Hkam, daughter of Sao Keo Boun Nam the saopha of Chiang Tung	Son
71.	Thudathta	Akyaw Minthami (Princess Si Phai), the daughter of Lord of Akyaw (Sao Sawn Kham)	Son Became a monk, east of Toungoo, and later assassinated by Karens there, but saved
72.	Khin Sin Hson	Thukha Hsaya, the daughter of Hso Saw Hpa the saopha of Hsipaw	Daughter
73.	unnamed daughter	Khin Hpone Htut, the elder daughter of Shan-Paik Htaung Hmu, the uncle of Khin Oo who are the King Tabinshwehti's mother	Died young
74.	Phyo Hpone Wai	Khin Htwe Hla, the niece of Thado Dhamma Yaza I of Prome	Daughter married to Baya Zeya; Children: Shin Wara and Myindwin Kadaw
75.	Eka Thura	Khin Htwe Hla, the niece of Thado Dhamma Yaza I of Prome	Son Governor of Kyaung Thu
76.	Min Hla	Khin Moe Shwe, the younger daughter of Shan-Paik Htaung Hmu, the uncle of Khin Oo who are the King Tabinshwehti's mother	Daughter married to 1st cousin Pyinsa Thiha, Governor of Tayotmaw and son of Thado Dhamma Yaza II of Prome
77.	Myat Hpone Wai	Khin Moe Shwe, the younger daughter of Shan-Paik Htaung Hmu, the uncle of Khin Oo who are the King Tabinshwehti's mother	Daughter married to Nanda Kyawhtin (later Kyawhtin Nawrahta of Pegu in the reign of Minye Thihathu II of Toungoo)
78.	unnamed daughter	Khin Moe Shwe, the younger daughter of Shan-Paik Htaung Hmu, the uncle of Khin Oo who are the King Tabinshwehti's mother	Died young
79.	Khin Hpone Myat II	Khin Htwe Phyu, the daughter of Yaza Theinzi	Daughter married to Utamayas Governor of Sagaing
80.	Saw Hpone Shi (nickname Min A-Htwe)	Amyoyon, the daughter of King Maha Thammarachathirat of Ayutthaya Kingdom	Daughter married to Sao Kaw Hla, the son of Ka Hlaing Hkam Governor of Htotalot with the title Thinkhaya by Bayinnaung the son of Sao Möng Hkam
81.	Khaymawaddy	Khin Hkam Pao	Daughter married to Hkam Khaing Noi, the saopha of Hsenwi
82.	Yaza Meitta	Khin Kauk (b) Khay Kham, the daughter of Thao Sai Kham King of Chiang Mai	Daughter married to 1st cousin, Min Shwe Myat, Governor of Taingda, son of Thado Dhamma Yaza II of Prome
83.	Shin Pit Sunt	Khin Hpone Htut, the daughter of Yaza Thinkyan	Son married to half-sister Yusiyawatta
84.	Khin Hpone Nyo	Khin Saw III	Daughter married to Yaza Thingyan, Governor of Tavoy sent to Arakan with her mother in 1600
85.	Khin Hpone Myint	Shin Htwe Myat	Daughter Queen consort of Burma (1599–1605) married to half-brother Nyaungyan
86.	Thukha Sanda Kalaya	Kathe Minthami (b) Lig Nga Lembi, the daughter of King Chalampa, Maharaja of Manipur	Daughter
87.	Khame Myet-Hna	Theinni Minthami (b) Sao Nang Hkam Hkoe Hpa, the daughter of Hkam Pak Hpa the saopha of Hsenwi	Son
88.	Mukthawaddy Thit	Nang Yon Thit, the daughter of Hkam Phing Hpa the saopha of Gengma in Yunnan	Daughter
89.	Aethennawaddy	Theingo Minthami, Alingouse, the daughter of King Dharmapala of Kotte	Daughter

The following are the children (1 son, 5 daughters) whose names are not listed in Hmannan's detailed list but appear in other parts of in both Maha Yazawin and Hmannan.

#	Name	Mother	Brief
90.	Myat Myo Hpone Si (aka Myo Myat Hpone)	unnamed	Daughter married to Shin Ne Myo, nephew of King Min Bin of Arakan, who became Governor of Tamaw, in July 1554 (Note: (Maha Yazawin Vol. 2 2006: 215) in the footnotes: Yazawin Thit chronicle gives the name "Myo Myat Hpone" and says her husband was governor of Kawaw (not Tamaw).)
91.	Wara Dhamma	unnamed	Son Governor of Moulmein on 6 January 1574 married to half-sister Thukhawaddy
92.	Thukhawaddy	unnamed	Daughter married to half-brother Wara Dhamma, Governor of Moulmein on 16 February 1574
93.	Min A-Kyi	unnamed	Daughter married to Nanda Kyawhtin, son of Governor of Pathein, on 16 February 1574
94.	Thugandawaddy	unnamed	Daughter married to Yamma Yawda, son of Lord of Tavoy, on 16 February 1574
95.	Myat Myo Hpone Wai	unnamed	Daughter married to 1st cousin Nanda Yawda, son of Thado Dhamma Yaza II of Prome, on 16 February 1574
96.	Kaweya Hla Nyi	Princess Moha Tevi, the daughter of Ang Chan I King of Longvek	Daughter married to Bodaw Ba Khin

== Siblings ==
=== Full siblings ===
He had four full siblings.

#	Name	Brief
1.	Dhamma Dewi of Toungoo	Queen consort of Burma (r. 1530–50)
2.	Minye Sithu of Martaban	Viceroy of Martaban (r. 1552–56)
3.	Thado Dhamma Yaza II of Prome	Viceroy of Prome (r. 1551–88)
4.	unnamed	Died young

=== Half siblings ===
He had two half-siblings, who were born to his father and his maternal aunt.

#	Name	Brief
1.	Minkhaung II of Toungoo	Viceroy of Toungoo (r. 1549–50, 1552–84)
2.	Thado Minsaw of Ava	Viceroy of Ava (r. 1555–84)

== Notable relations ==
=== Nephews and nieces ===
Name	Relation	Brief
Minye Thihathu II of Toungoo	Half-nephew; Son-in-law	King of Toungoo (r. 1597–1609); Viceroy of Toungoo (r. 1584–97) married to half-cousin Min Khin Saw
Min Phyu	Half-niece; Daughter-in-law	Queen of the Southern Palace (r. 1583–96) m. to half cousin Nanda
Thiri Yaza Dewi	Half-niece; Daughter-in-law	Queen consort of Burma (r. 1583–99) m. to half cousin Nanda
Min Htwe	Half-niece; Daughter-in-law	Queen consort of Burma (r. 1583–99) m. to half cousin Nanda
Hsinbyushin Medaw	Niece; Daughter-in-law	Queen consort of Lan Na (r. 1579–1601/02) m. to 1st cousin Nawrahta Minsaw
Min Taya Medaw	Niece; Daughter-in-law	Queen consort of Burma (r. 1583–99) m. to 1st cousin Nanda

=== Grandchildren and beyond ===
Name	Relation	Brief
Mingyi Swa	Grandson	Crown Prince of Burma (r. 1581–93)
Khin Ma Hnaung	Granddaughter	Queen consort of Arakan (r. 1600–12)
Natshin Medaw	Granddaughter	Princess consort of the Crown Prince of Burma (r. 1581–86)
Minye Kyawswa II of Ava	Grandson	Crown Prince of Burma (r. 1593–99); Viceroy of Ava (r. 1587–93)
Thado Dhamma Yaza III of Prome	Grandson	King of Prome (r. 1595–97); Viceroy of Prome (r. 1588–95)
Anaukpetlun	Grandson	King of Burma (r. 1605–28)
Yodaya Mibaya	Granddaughter	Queen consort of Siam (r. 1602?–05)
Natshinnaung	Grandson	Viceroy of Toungoo (r. 1610–12); King of Toungoo (r. 1609–10)
Thado Minsaw of Lan Na (Tu Laung)	Grandson	Siam-backed King of Lan Na (r. 1607/08–08/09)
Minye Deibba of Lan Na	Grandson	King of Lan Na (r. 1607/08–14)
Thado Kyaw of Lan Na	Grandson	King of Lan Na (r. 1614)
Atula Sanda Dewi	Granddaughter	Chief queen consort of Burma (r. 1609–28)
Minye Kyawswa of Sagu	Grandson	Crown Prince of Burma (r. 1635–47)
Minye Deibba	Great grandson	King of Burma (r. 1628–29)
Pindale	Great grandson	King of Burma (r. 1648–61)
Pye	Great grandson	King of Burma (r. 1661–72)
Narawara	2 times great grandson	King of Burma (r. 1672–73)
Minye Kyawhtin	2x great grandson	King of Burma (r. 1673–98)
Sanay	3x great grandson	King of Burma (r. 1698–1714)
Taninganway	4x great grandson	King of Burma (r. 1714–33)
Maha Dhamma Yaza	5x great grandson	King of Burma (r. 1733–52)

=== In-laws ===
Name	Relation	Brief
Narapati II of Ava	Father-in-law	King of Ava (r. 1501–27); Father of Sanda Dewi
Narapati III of Ava	Father-in-law	King of Ava (r. 1545–51); Father of Khin Aung Kham
Maha Thammarachathirat	Father-in-law	King of Siam (r. 1569–90); Father of Suphankanlaya
Tabinshwehti	Brother-in-law	King of Burma (r. 1530–50); Half-brother of Atula Thiri Maha Yaza Dewi and husband of Dhamma Dewi of Toungoo
Takayutpi	Brother-in-law	King of Hanthawaddy (r. 1526–39); Half-brother of Sanda Yathi and Manithayi
Naresuan	Brother-in-law and grandson-in-law	King of Siam (r. 1590–1605); Brother of Suphankanlaya and husband of Yodaya Mibaya
Min Razagyi	Grandson-in-law	King of Arakan (r. 1593-1612) husband of Khin Ma Hnaung and son-in-law of Nanda Bayin

== Modern descendants ==
A 17th generation descendant of his still holds hereditary office in Bohmong Circle (modern-day Bandarban District) in the Chittagong Hill Tracts region of Bangladesh.

== Bibliography ==
- Htin Aung, Maung (1967). A History of Burma. New York and London: Cambridge University Press.
- Kala, U (1724). Maha Yazawin (in Burmese). Vol. 1–3 (2006, 4th printing ed.). Yangon: Ya-Pyei Publishing.
- Lieberman, Victor B. (2003). Strange Parallels: Southeast Asia in Global Context, c. 800–1830, volume 1, Integration on the Mainland. Cambridge University Press. ISBN 978-0-521-80496-7.
- Royal Historical Commission of Burma (1832). Hmannan Yazawin (in Burmese). Vol. 1–3 (2003 ed.). Yangon: Ministry of Information, Myanmar.
- Sein Lwin Lay, Kahtika U (1968). Mintaya Shwe Hti and Bayinnaung: Ketumadi Taungoo Yazawin (in Burmese) (2006, 2nd printing ed.). Yangon: Yan Aung Sarpay.
- Thaw Kaung, U (2010). Aspects of Myanmar History and Culture. Yangon: Gangaw Myaing.
