= Nyaungyan Min =

Nyaungyan Min; ညောင်ရမ်းမင်း
- King of Toungoo

King of Burma
- Reign: 19 December 1599 – 5 November 1605
- Coronation: 25 February 1600
- Predecessor: Nanda
- Successor: Anaukpetlun
- Chief Ministers: Maha Okka Dhamma and Maha Okka Thena

King of Ava
- Reign: 19 April 1597 – 19 December 1599
- Predecessor: Baya Yawda and Let-Yway-Gyi Myin-Hmu (Co-Administrators)
- Successor: Himself (as King of Toungoo)
- Born: 8 November 1555; Friday, 11th waning of Tazaungmon 917 ME; Pegu (Bago)
- Died: 5 November 1605 (aged 49); Saturday, 11th waning of Tazaungmon 967 ME; near Hsipaw (Thibaw)
- Burial: 7 November 1605; Sandamuni Pagoda, Ava (Inwa)
- Consort: Thiri Maha Dhamma Yaza Dipadi Dewi; Khin Me
- Issue among others...: Anaukpetlun; Thalun
Regnal name
- Mahā Sīhasūra Dhammarāja
- House: Toungoo
- Father: Bayinnaung
- Mother: Khin Pyezon
- Religion: Theravada Buddhism

Nyaung-yan Min (Burmese: ညောင်ရမ်းမင်း [ɲàʊɰ̃jáɰ̃ mɪ́ɰ̃]; 8 November 1555 – 5 November [O.S. 26 October] 1605) was king of the Toungoo dynasty of Burma (Myanmar) from 1599 to 1605. He is also referred to as the founder of the restored Toungoo dynasty or Nyaungyan dynasty for starting the reunification process following the collapse of the First Toungoo Empire.

A son of King Bayinnaung by a minor queen, Nyaungyan gradually emerged as a power in Upper Burma in the mid-1590s. When major vassal rulers renounced their ties with King Nanda in 1597, he too broke away by seizing Ava (Inwa). But he stayed out of myriad wars in the low country. Instead, he methodically consolidated his base in the upcountry, and went on to acquire the surrounding cis-Salween Shan states until his death in 1605. He also rebuilt the economy of Upper Burma, and (re-)established several social, financial and military standards, many of which would be retained to the end of the Toungoo dynasty in 1752. His efforts paved the way for his eldest son and successor Anaukpetlun to restore major portions of the Toungoo Empire in the next two decades.

== Early life ==
He was born Shin Thissa (ရှင်သစ္စာ, [ʃɪ̀ɴ θɪʔsà]) to Lady Khin Pyezon and King Bayinnaung on 8 November 1555. (Note: The chronicle Zatadawbon Yazawin (Zata 1960: 47) says he was born on a Friday in the 9th month (Tazaungmon) of 917 ME, and that he died at age 49 (50th year). Maha Yazawin (Maha Yazawin Vol. 3 2006: 128) says that he died as he was turning 50. Since he died on 11th waning of Tazaungmon 967 ME, he was born on or after 11th waning of Tazaungmon 917 ME (8 November 1555). And because he was a Friday born, he was born on 11th waning of Tazaungmon 917 ME, the only Friday left in that month.) He had an elder brother, Shin Ubote. He was one of the 91 children born to minor queens, who were ranked below the six children by the three senior queens. Indeed, Thissa had to wait until he was 25 to get a governorship. On 8 February 1581, the king appointed Thissa to succeed Ubote, who died in January 1581, as governor of Nyaungyan, a small town in present-day Meiktila District, south of Ava (Inwa). The small town governor was married to his half sister Khin Hpone Myint, who like him was a child of a junior queen. (Khin Hpone Myint's name is sometimes reported as "Khin Hpone Myat". (Note: Both (Maha Yazawin Vol. 3 2006: 61) and (Hmannan Vol. 3 2003: 42) say that he married Khin Hpone Myat on 9th waxing of Tabodwe 938 ME (25 February 1577). But the name Khin Hpone Myat is most probably a typographical error. Hmannan's detailed list of Bayinnaung's issue (Hmannan Vol. 3 2003: 68) shows that her name was "Khin Hpone Myint", daughter of Shin Htwe Myat. The complete list (Hmannan Vol. 3 2003: 68–73) does include two other daughters named Khin Hpone Myat; the first Khin Hpone Myat, daughter of Khin Gyi Sit, was married to Sithu, Gov. of Mawlamyaing, and the second Khin Hpone Myat, daughter of Khin Htwe Phyu, to Ottamarit, Gov. of Sagaing.))The couple had been married since 25 February 1577, and had a 3-year-old child, one Thakin Lat. (Note: Thakin Lat was born on 21 January 1578 (Tuesday, 14th waxing of Tabodwe 939 ME) per (Zata 1960: 79))

== Governor of Nyaungyan (1581–97) ==
It was at Nyaungyan that Thissa slowly made his name, and came to be known as Nyaungyan Min (Lord of Nyaungyan). He indirectly benefited from Pegu's troubles in the next decade and a half that saw Pegu's power gradually retrench from its vassal states.

=== Early years ===
For his first dozen years at Nyaungyan, Thissa was a loyal, if unremarkable, governor. He quietly ruled a small region which fell within the jurisdiction of his half-uncle Thado Minsaw, Viceroy of Ava (Upper Burma). One key decision he made came in 1584 when he sided with King Nanda after Thado Minsaw revolted. He remained a loyal vassal during the Siamese rebellion (1584–93) although it is unclear how much he, a second-tier governor, could have contributed to the war effort. (Note: Nyaungyan did not appear in any of the commander lists of the Toungoo campaigns until 1596. See (Maha Yazawin Vols 2 and 3 2006).) It was only in 1594 after Nanda decided to withdraw central administration from Upper Burma and the Shan states that Nyaungyan emerged as a power in Upper Burma. In December 1593, Nanda recalled Viceroy of Ava Minye Kyawswa II to Pegu to take over as Crown Prince, and more importantly, the king decided not to appoint a replacement viceroy or governor of Upper Burma. Given that Pegu possessed no institutional capacity to directly administer the upcountry, Nanda had essentially chosen to devolve power to myriad minor vassals rather than appoint an effective viceroy or governor who could turn against him. Nanda's paranoia had a basis. His own son Thado Dhamma Yaza III, Viceroy of Prome (Pyay), revolted in April 1595.

=== Break from Pegu ===
Nanda's policy of devolution created a power vacuum in the upcountry which ambitious governors like Nyaungyan now maneuvered to fill. The opportunity for Nyaungyan to come to the forefront came in 1596 when Thado Dhamma Yaza III, the self-proclaimed king of Prome, invaded central Burma. Nanda ordered Nyaungyan to organize a defense. Nyaungyan agreed to follow the order as he could not let anyone else take over central Burma. His forces successfully stopped the Prome advance at Pakhan, a key town on the Irrawaddy about 120 km south of Ava, but could not retake more southerly towns. After the fighting was done, Prome forces had occupied central Burma up to Salin, about 240 km south of Ava. Prome planned to resume the war in the following dry season of 1597–98.

Nyaungyan, whose army essentially controlled the region around Ava, quietly decided to consolidate power for himself. At Pegu, Nanda was desperate to retain Nyaungyan's loyalty. The king awarded Nyaungyan the title of Minye Nandameit (မင်းရဲနန္ဒမိတ်) along with lavish gifts. At the same time, he was suspicious of his stronger vassals' intentions. The king asked Nyaungyan, Minye Thihathu II of Toungoo and Nawrahta Minsaw of Lan Na to send their eldest sons to Pegu, essentially to hold them as hostages. It was a major miscalculation on Nanda's part for he had no real power to enforce his order. Indeed, he could do nothing when the viceroys of Toungoo and Lan Na formally declared independence.

The chronicles say only that Nyaungyan ignored the king's order but do not mention his formal declaration of independence during Nanda's reign. (Note: Chronicles themselves do not agree about the degree of his insurrection. Maha Yazawin (Maha Yazawin Vol. 3 2006: 128) says he became king of Ava in 1597. But Hmannan Yazawin (Hmannan Vol. 3 2003: 142) recognizes him as king only after Nanda's fall in 1599.) But surviving royal orders from Nyaungyan's court show that he essentially did in 1597. First, he declared without the king's permission on 19 April [O.S. 9 April] 1597 that he would take over Ava, and that he would officially move into the new palace there on 27 August [O.S. 17 August] 1597. (Note: (Than Tun Vol. 2 1985: 11 and 116): 5th waxing of Kason 959 ME = 19 April 1597. (Than Tun Vol. 2 1985: 11 and 115): Wednesday, 2nd waning of Tawthalin 959 ME = 27 August 1597.) According to Than Tun, Nyaungyan "virtually declared" himself King of Ava on 9 May [O.S. 29 April] 1597 in the order announcing the appointment of Maha Okka Dhamma and Maha Okka Thena as chief ministers of his court.

== Ruler of Ava ==
=== Consolidation of Upper Burma ===
Despite his de facto, if not de jure, independence, Nyaungyan was more concerned about Prome than Pegu. He rushed to consolidate his base before the next dry season. He and his army marched to towns around the Ava region, receiving the allegiance of local governors. Rival governors at Yamethin and Pagan (Bagan) initially resisted but eventually submitted to the rising power on 12 July [O.S. 2] 1597 and on 1 August [O.S. 22 July] 1597, respectively.

His consolidation drive was watched with alarm not only by Prome but also by Toungoo. The two powers of central Burma decided not to wait until the dry season. In September 1597, Minye Thihathu II of Toungoo sent in a small army to contest Nyaungyan's acquisitions of Yamethin, the traditional border between Toungoo and Ava. At Prome, Thado Dhamma Yaza III was about to start the campaign to Ava when he was assassinated on 15 September [O.S. 5 September] 1597 by Yan Naing.

The assassination was a fortuitous event for Nyaungyan. Upon hearing the news, Minye Thihahtu II opportunistically redirected the Toungoo army to invade Prome instead. Yan Naing repulsed the Toungoo attack. After the dust settled, Toungoo decided to focus its energies on capturing Pegu; Yan Naing ruled a smaller region as the lord of Salin switched sides to Nyaungyan; and Nyaungyan was spared from further attacks by more established powers. (Nyaungyan was forever grateful to Yan Naing for breaking up what would be a two-pronged attack by Prome and Toungoo. In 1605, as he lay dying, he asked his eldest son and heir-apparent Anaukpetlun to spare the life of Yan Naing when Prome was captured. When asked why, the king replied that if Yan Naing had not broken up Prome's invasion, his then small army would likely have been defeated in a two-front war.)

Nyaungyan spent the next year further consolidating northern regions of Upper Burma. By November 1598, he felt strong enough to declare his ambitions. On 14 November [O.S. 4 November] 1598, as Toungoo and its ally Mrauk-U (Arakan) invaded Lower Burma, he proclaimed himself king, not just of Ava but also of all of the lands that once belonged to his father Bayinnaung. (Note: (Than Tun Vol. 1 1983: 18–19, 181–182): The royal order dated 14 November 1598 (1st waning of Tazaungmon 960 ME) says that the extent of Nyaungyan's domain included the Iron Bridge in the east, Siam in the south, the sea coast in the west, and Manipur and northern Shan states (Kachin State) in the north.) Toungoo and Mrauk-U forces went on to capture Pegu in December 1599, and divide up the city's enormous riches as the capital of the Toungoo Empire for the last 60 years. But from a strategic standpoint, it was Nyaungyan whose control of Upper Burma, "the 'heartland' where most of the food of the country was produced and its population lived", would ultimately come out ahead. He quietly planned extending his rule to the Shan states surrounding Upper Burma.

=== Coronation ===
On 25 February [O.S. 15 February] 1600, Nyaungyan crowned himself as king with the reign name of Thiha Thura Maha Dhamma Yaza (သီဟသူရ မဟာဓမ္မရာဇာ). His chief queen's title was Thiri Maha Dhamma Yaza Dipadi Dewi. He appointed his three sons by the chief queen appanages: The eldest son Thakin Lat (later known as King Anaukpetlun) was given Dabayin in fief with the title Thado Minkhaung Kyaw; his middle son Thakin Gyi (later, King Thalun) was given Talote in fief with the title of Minye Theinkhathu; the youngest son Thakin Phyu was granted Sagu with the title of Minye Uzana. (Note: Both Maha Yazawin (Maha Yazawin Vol. 3 2006: 114) and Hmannan Yazawin (Hmannan Vol. 3 2003: 122) chronicles say that Nyaungyan appointed his eldest son crown prince on that day. But a surviving royal order (Than Tun Vol. 1 1983: 12, 174–175) says that his eldest son was appointed crown prince only on 11 August 1603 (5th waxing of Wagaung 965 ME).)

=== Brief war with Toungoo ===
His ascendance would not go unchallenged. Fresh off the conquest of Lower Burma, Toungoo forces seized Yamethin, the border town, in September 1600. In response, Nyaungyan himself led his army, and marched to Yamethin on 6 October [O.S. 26 September] 1600. Toungoo forces fiercely defended the town but Nyaungyan's army prevailed in the end. It was the last time Toungoo breached the border.

== Acquisition of cis-Salween Shan states ==
Nyaungyan spent the rest of his reign reacquiring the cis-Salween Shan States. By his death in 1605, he had conquered all of the cis-Salween Shan states. His eldest son Anaukpetlun emerged as an able military leader, and won several key decisive victories for his father. (Note: Anaukpetlun was the commander who won all the decisive battles in his father's Shan states campaigns (1599–1605). He won the battles of Mohnyin and Mogaung in 1599–1600 (Maha Yazawin Vol. 3 2006: 113–114); Nyaungshwe in 1601 (Maha Yazawin Vol. 3 2006: 116); Mone in 1603 (Maha Yazawin Vol. 3 2006: 118–119); Hsenwi in 1605 (Maha Yazawin Vol. 3 2006: 124–126).)

=== Mohnyin and Mogaung (1599–1600) ===
Nyaungyan's first target was the northernmost Shan states of Mohnyin and Mogaung in present-day Kachin State. On 18 October [O.S. 8 October] 1599, Anaukpetlun and his 2,000-strong invasion army left Ava for the front. The saopha (chief) of Mohnyin submitted without a fight but the saopha of Mogaung resisted from a fortified garrison atop of a nearby hill near Mogaung. About a month later, an agreement that allowed him to keep his office as a vassal of Ava was reached. (Note: The chronicle Maha Yazawin (Maha Yazawin Vol. 3 2006: 113–114) says Anaukpetlun's forces captured both Mohnyin and Mogaung towns but could not topple the Mogaung garrison outside the town. But later chronicles reject that. Yazawin Thit and Hmannan Yazawin (Hmannan Vol. 3 2003: 121–122) cite a contemporary inscription and a contemporary poem Minye Deibba Eigyin which say that the ruler of Mogaung submitted, and was reappointed at Mogaung.) The vassalage was likely nominal. The chief would revolt again in 1604.

=== Nyaungshwe (1601) ===
Nyaungyan's drive into the Shan states was briefly interrupted by the short war with Toungoo over Yamethin in October 1600. After Yamethin was retaken, Nyaungyan decided to attack Nyaungshwe, a sizable and strategically located state next door to Yamethin. The Shan state controlled 39 vassal towns, and was located next the powerful state of Mone in the south and Hsipaw in the north. On 6 January [O.S. 27 December 1600] 1601, Nyaungyan and his small army (seven regiments consisted of 3500 men, 400 horses, 30 elephants) invaded. The invasion is an example in which Ava's musket corps proved their worth. Nyaungshwe forces drove back three vanguard regiments trying to take an outer garrison located about 3 km from the town. The rout was such that only one third of the troops reportedly returned. Nyaungshwe forces came out of the garrison, pinning a fourth Ava regiment. But the Ava command brought out their musketeers, and counterattacked, causing heavy casualties on the enemy. Nyaungshwe forces rushed back for the safety of the walls of Nyaungshwe but were cut off by Anaukpetlun's regiment. Totally surrounded, the saopha surrendered and submitted. But Nyaungyan reappointed him to his office. The 39 towns of Nyaungshwe now came under Ava.

=== Bhamo (1602) ===
His next target was Bhamo, a small state next to Mogaung. His invasion force (5000 men, 600 horses, 40 elephants) left Ava for the front on 24 February [O.S. 14 February] 1602. The army took Bhamo without a fight. Tho Sein, which recorded in Chinese as Si Zheng (思正), the saopha of Bhamo, had fled to the Chinese vassal state of Maing Se (Yunnan). When Anaukpetlun's army showed up at Maing Se, the ruler of Maing Se gave up the body of Tho Sein, who had died under uncertain circumstances. Nyaungyan appointed Sao Hsaing Lon saopha of Bhamo. The extradition "shows the final abandonment of the Chinese claim to overlordship in Upper Burma".

=== Mone (1603–04) ===
After Bhamo, he closely watched developments in Lan Na whose embattled ruler Nawrahta Minsaw had just submitted to King Naresuan of Siam. Over the next year, Nawrahta Minsaw went on to drive out Lan Xang and its allies from eastern Lan Na. By June 1603, Lan Na was again united, albeit under Siamese suzerainty. (Note: See (Fernquest Spring 2005) for differences between northern Thai and southern Thai chronicle narratives. Northern (Chiang Mai and Nan) chronicles do not say Lan Na was a vassal of Ayutthaya (Siam). But the southern Ayutthaya Chronicle and standard Burmese chronicles say it was.) Concerned that Mone, located immediately north of Lan Na, could be next, Nyaungyan prepared to get there first.

Nyaungyan did not expect Mone, a major state with a sizable force, to be a pushover. On 13 November [O.S. 3 November] 1603, after a relic chamber dedication ceremony at the Sanda Muni Pagoda in Ava, the king left for the front with a 6000-strong army. Anaukpetlun came with him. His second son Thalun stayed behind at Ava with a garrison. After a three-day layover at Nyaungshwe to add more troops, two armies—the vanguard army led by Anaukpetlun, and the main army led by the king himself—invaded. Although they had counted on Mone forces to defend behind the walls of Mone, the 5000-strong vanguard army was met en route by the Mone army. Though they were initially surprised by Mone's willingness to engage them in open battle, the more experienced, probably better equipped, Ava army decisively defeated the Mone army. The vanguard army alone captured both the saopha and the city. Afterwards, scores of Ava battalions fanned out to receive the allegiance from 37 vassals of Mone, which included Mobye (present-day northern Kayah State) to those along the Lan Na border. The king arrived back at Ava on the New Year's Day of 966 ME, 9 April [O.S. 30 March] 1604. (Note: (Maha Yazawin Vol. 3 2006: 122): The king allowed the saopha of Mone and his retinue to stay in Ava. The saopha and over a hundred of his men fled the city on 9 October 1604 (Saturday, 2nd waning of Thadingyut 966 ME). They were caught soon after by the capital guards, and everyone was executed.)

=== Instabilities and Siamese threat (1604–05) ===
Despite the success, Nyaungyan's hold over the cis-Salween states was still extremely weak. As soon as he got back to Ava, the king was greeted with reports of unrest along the Chinese border. With a Siamese attack on Mone still highly probable, he initially decided to live with the unrest for the time being. On 7 May [O.S. 27 April] 1604, he ordered a campaign to quell unrest in the northern states that would begin on 8 January [O.S. 29 December 1604] 1605. In essence, he had decided to preserve his manpower for the next eight months. But his hand was forced when Mogaung revolted outright. He sent Anaukpetlun with a 5000-man army on 18 November [O.S. 8 November] 1604. He was greatly relieved when Anaukpetlun was able to score a quick decisive victory, and captured the rebel saopha and his family.

But the relief was temporary. Right after Anaukpetlun rushed back to Ava, Bhamo, the eastern neighbor of Mogaung, revolted with the help of Hsenwi (Theinni). (Hsenwi may have been an ally of Siam, and may have been acting in concert with Siam.) Ava was in a bind. The court initially announced on 27 February [O.S. 17 February] 1605 that his majesty himself would lead the campaign to Bhamo and Hsenwi. But the campaign was indefinitely postponed due to reports of 20 Siamese army regiments led by Naresuan himself marching toward the border. The Ava command believed that the Siamese army may not only invade Mone but also attack Ava itself. They appeared to have been prepared to meet the enemy in the Irrawaddy valley as the king was still in Ava on 20 March [O.S. 10 March] 1605. But the expected invasion never came. The Siamese king suddenly fell ill at Mueang Haeng at the border and died on 25 April [O.S. 15 April] 1605. The Siamese command called off the invasion.

=== Momeik, Hsipaw and Hsenwi (1605) ===
The Siamese threat dissipated with the death of Naresuan. At least the Ava command apparently believed so. They decided on 21 July [O.S. 11 July] 1605 to acquire the remaining Near Shan states of Momeik, Onbaung (Hsipaw/Thibaw), and Hsenwi, as well as the Hsenwi-backed Bhamo, in the upcoming dry season.

The Ava command was most concerned about Hsenwi, the farthest state from Ava, and fronted by Momeik in the west and Hsipaw in the southwest. They expected Bhamo to fall in line once Hsenwi fell. If required, a separate campaign to Bhamo would begin on 27 December [O.S. 17 December] 1605. The plan was announced on 6 October [O.S. 26 September] 1605. It shows they expected the Momeik–Hsipaw–Hsenwi campaign to be over by mid-December at the latest.

The actual campaign was even shorter. The two-pronged invasion was over in less than a month. The First Army (3000 men, 200 horses, 20 elephants) led by Anaukpetlun marched to Momeik via Singu while the Second Army (4000 men, 300 horses, 20 elephants) led by Nyaungyan marched to Hsipaw. The two armies took Momeik and Hsipaw without a fight. The armies then converged on Hsenwi from west and southwest. The Hsenwi army was defeated twice by Anaukpetlun, and the city was taken. The king himself had been unwell since Hsipaw, and could not participate in the battle. The king reappointed the Hsenwi saopha but sent his immediate family and brothers as well as able Hsenwi soldiers to Ava. The 39 vassal towns of Hsenwi came under Nyaungyan's authority.

== Death ==
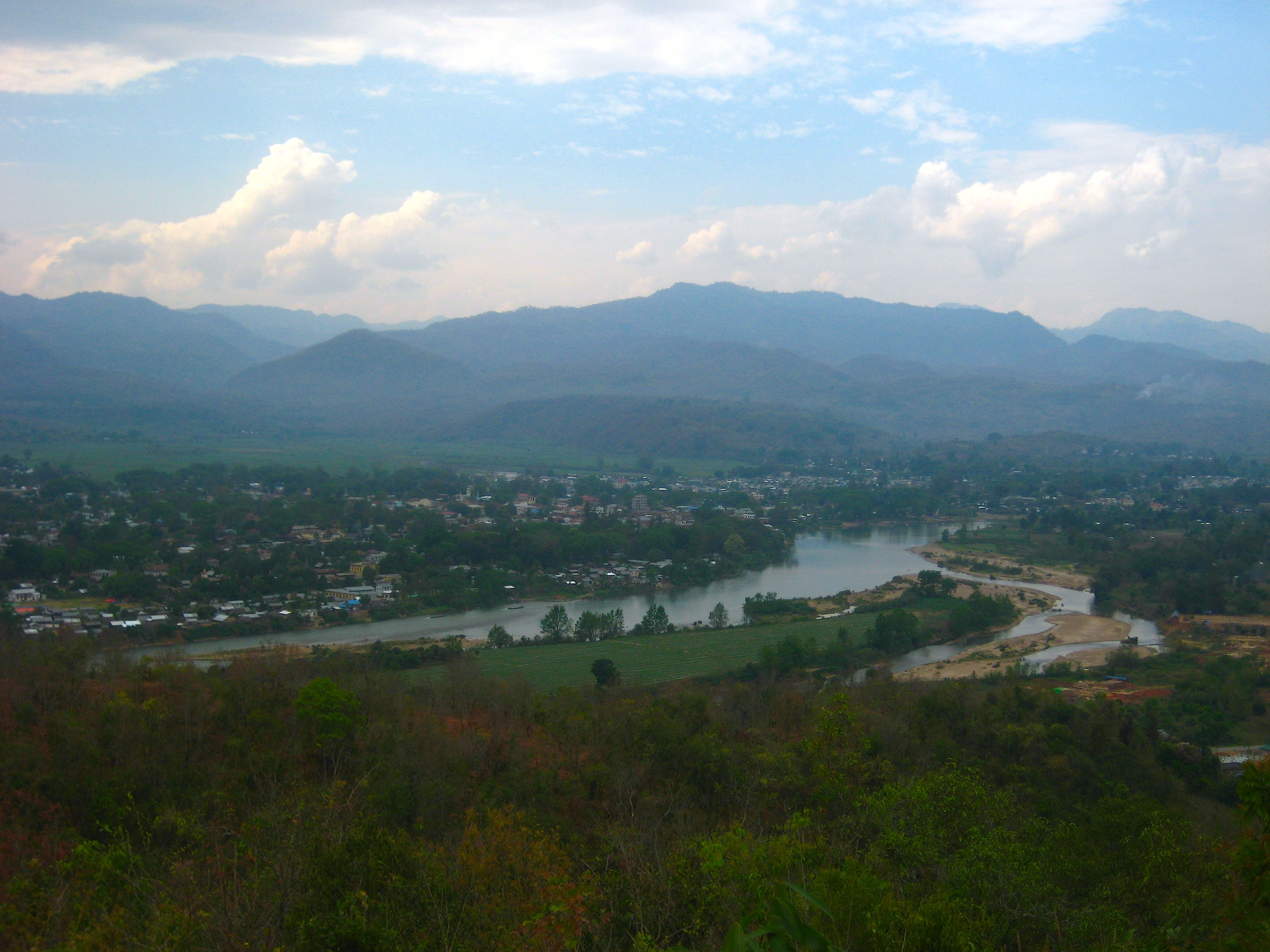
Present-day Hsipaw

The king now controlled all of the cis-Salween Shan states that ringed Upper Burma. He had already planned to attack Prome and Toungoo next, as part of his grand plan to restore his father's empire. But it was not to be. The troops rushed the ailing king back home but he died en route south of Hsipaw on 5 November [O.S. 26 October] 1605. (Note: The standard chronicles Maha Yazawin (Maha Yazawin Vol. 3 2006: 126–127) and Hmannan Yazawin (Hmannan Vol. 3 2003: 140–141) say that his death was announced on 13th waning of Tabaung 967 ME (5 March 1606), two days after the king's death on 11th waning of Tabaung 967 ME (3 March 1606). But according to a surviving royal order (Than Tun Vol. 1 1983: 19), the king's death was announced on 13th waning of Tazaungmon 967 ME (7 November 1605). Than Tun takes the royal order's date over the chronicles' date, which he believes is a copying error, reporting the month as Tabaung instead of Tazaungmon.) His death was announced two days later at Ava. During the cremation ceremony, when his body was half-consumed in the fire, Anaukpetlun administered the oath of allegiance to everyone around. The king's ashes were buried beside the Sandamuni Pagoda.

== Administration ==
Nyaungyan was deeply interested in administration. Several of the surviving royal orders of his court dealt with (re)-establishing norms and standards on social, economy, and military fronts. He reaffirmed the people into their traditional units of attachment and non-attachment: ahmudan (Crown-service groups, called kyundaw in the Pagan period); paya kyun (Sangha subjects); ordinary kyun (private, usually household retainers); and those not attached to anyone (athi). (Note: See (Than Tun Vol. 1 1983: 14–16) for the royal order dated 9th waning of Wagaung 966 ME (18 August 1604) for a detailed list of service classes. The order also includes how much taxation each class was expected to pay.) He repaired and rebuilt irrigation works to rebuild the war-torn economy, and standardized taxation levels. Moreover, he introduced several standards to his military. He commissioned/reestablished several military units. Some of which were hereditary cavalry and elephant corps while many units were newly formed with men from Shan states. Furthermore, the royal order dated 26 February [O.S. 16 October] 1605 is the earliest document specifying Burmese military unit formation. It states that 1000 foot soldiers be placed under 100 leaders called akyat (အကြပ် [ʔə tɕaʔ]), 10 chiefs called ahsaw (အဆော် [ʔə sʰɔ̀]) and 1 commander called ake (အကဲ [ʔə kɛ́]); and that all must be adequately equipped with weapons including guns and cannons.

== Legacy ==
In contrast to over 250 years of poly-centrism following Pagan Empire's collapse, the interregnum following the Toungoo Empire's fall was brief. While he died before the restoration was complete, Nyaungyan is credited with launching the process. His success in reuniting the most populous and traditional base of power in the country paved the way for the eventual reunification of the country by his successor Anaukpetlun (who went on to restore the Toungoo Empire less Siam, Lan Xang and Manipur by 1622.) Nyaungyan's decision to reacquire the Near Shan states before venturing south is seen as a key factor: "If one wanted the whole country, that region [Shan states] had to be secured first before the coasts could be taken." The control of Upper Burma and near Shan states gave his successors "a huge reservoir of men and materiel" to take on several small, depopulated kingdoms to the south. Equally important were his administrative reforms, many of which were continued to be carried out by his successors. Some of the orders from his court were reissued in toto by his successors all the way to the last king of the Toungoo dynasty.

In all, Nyaungyan Min is remembered as the founder of the Nyaungyan dynasty, also referred to as "Later Toungoo dynasty" or "Restored Toungoo dynasty" by Western historians.

== Family ==
Nyaungyan Min and his chief queen Khin Hpone Myint had three sons and one daughter. He also had 11 sons and 8 daughters by minor queens/concubines. He had a total of 14 sons and 9 daughters.

His children by the chief queen were:

Name	Notes
Anaukpetlun aka Thakin Lat	King of Burma (r. 1605–28)
Yaza Manisuda Dayakataw aka Thakin Gyi	King of Burma (r. 1629–48)
Min Taya Medaw	Queen of Burma (r. 1609–28) (Note: (Maha Yazawin Vol. 3 2006: 134): She was raised as the chief queen of her full brother Thakin Lat (King Anaukpetlun) on 8 February 1609.)
Minye Kyawswa of Sagu aka Thakin Phyu	Crown Prince of Burma (r. 1635–1647)

Nyaungyan Min had 9 junior queens who bore him children:

Name	Mother	Brief
1. Shin Sit Naing	Watthana Kataw Shin Myo Myat	Son received rank Minye Nawrahta in Anaukpetlun regime married to Thilawaddy daughter of King Yaza Manisuda Dayakataw and became Gov.of Ngasingu
2. Unnamed son	Watthana Kataw Shin Myo Myat	Son died after was born 7 days
3. Khin Min Pu	Timmayara	Daughter died at age 16
4. Khin Min Lat	Timmayara	Daughter, married to her half-brother Minye Thihakyaw (Minye Nawrahta) Gov.of Pyay
5. Minye Nawratha	Nang Mueng Suang the daughter of Hso Gon Hpa the saopha of Hkamti	Son died at age 17
6. Min Khin Pu	Nang Mueng Suang the daughter of Hso Gon Hpa the saopha of Hkamti	Daughter married with Shin Sithu (Minye Thinkhaya, Thiri Dhamma Thawka) son of Nanda Bayin became Gov.of Toungoo in King Yaza Manisuda Dayakataw regime
7. Minye Thiha Kyawhtin	Nang Mueng Suang the daughter of Hso Gon Hpa the saopha of Hkamti	Son Gov.of Kyan Ngaeb in King Yaza Manisuda Dayakataw regime and Gov.of Pyay in King Ngathipdayaka regime married to Myat Hla Hpone Phyo the daughter of Minye Kyawswa of Saku, received the rank Minye Nawrahta in King Pye Min regime
8. Warathura	Nang Hkoe Pam the daughter of Hso Oo Hpa the saopha of Mongnai (private name of saopha and his daughter from the chronicle of Mongnai)	Son he help Minyedeippa her nephew to survived from the executioner in King Thalun regime
9. Shin Myo Myat	Nang Hkoe Pam the daughter of Hso Oo Hpa the saopha of Mongnai (private name of saopha and his daughter from the chronicle of Mongnai)	Daughter married to her half-brother King Anaukpetlun
10. Myo Pye Kyawthu	Sounyè Kataw Shin Bwe Hla	Son Gov of Myeik with the rank Minyenandathu (Minyeyandathu) later Gov.of Hanthawaddy married to her half-sister Yadana Shwe Ngon
11. Myo Bapha	Sounyè Kataw Shin Bwe Hla	Daughter married her half-brother Minye Yandathu
12. Daughter unnamed	Sounyè Kataw Shin Bwe Hla	Daughter died young
13. Myat Myo Nithala	Sounyè Kataw Shin Bwe Hla	Daughter became the queen of Taungdwingyi
14. Minye Nyo	Myinkhaung Kataw Khin Nè Yun	Son he help Minyedeippa her nephew to survived from the executioner in King Thalun regime
15. Thiri San Phyo	Myinkhaung Kataw Khin Nè Yun	Daughter, married to Minye-Thiharaja of Myedu son of Mingyi Swa
16. Yadana Shwe Ngon	Myinkhaung Kataw Khin Nè Yun	Daughter married to her half-brother Myo Pye Kyawthu (Minyenandathu, Minyeyandathu)
17. Thiha Ye Kyaw	Myinkhaung Kataw Khin Nè Yun	Son Gov.of Myethat with the rank Minye Nara became Gov.of Myetè married with Nang Naw Peng Mueng the daughter of Maung Pu the blinder the son of Hso Oo Hpa the saopha of Mongnai
18. Khin Hnaung	Myinkhaung Kataw Khin Nè Yun	Son Gov.of Pantim city in Pye Min regime and became Gov.of Chiangmai in Ngathipkhaungdayaka regime with title Minye Yannaung and Mai Aung Yadana received new name is Shwe Chak Waw Pa La
19. Khin Min Hla	Khin Mye daughter niece of Tabinshwehti daughter of Min Letya of Ava	Daughter married to Minye Aung Naing son of King Nanda Bayin
20. Min Khin Lat	Khin Mye daughter niece of Tabinshwehti daughter of Min Letya of Ava	Daughter married to Minye Thiha son of King Nanda Bayin
21. Nara Shwe Myet Hkam	Nang Hkam Puay from Mongnai	Son
22. Shwe Nan Vieng	Nang Hkam Puay from Mongnai	Son
23. Thiri Eka	Nang Hkam Puay from Mongnai	Daughter
24. Khin Pu	Nang Hkam Puay from Mongnai	Daughter married to Dingga Maraz who received rank Minye Nandameit Gov.of Kyauksarez the son of Minye Kyawswasunt after he died she remarried with Minye Yan Naung in reign of King Yaza Manisuda Dayakataw

== See also ==
- Nyaungyan Mintaya Ayedawbon

== Bibliography ==
- Aung-Thwin, Michael A.; Maitrii Aung-Thwin (2012). A History of Myanmar Since Ancient Times (illustrated ed.). Honolulu: University of Hawai'i Press. ISBN 978-1-86189-901-9.
- Damrong Rajanubhab (1928). Chris Baker (ed.). Our Wars with the Burmese: Thai–Burmese Conflict 1539–1767. Translated by Aung Thein (2001 ed.). Bangkok: White Lotus. ISBN 974-7534-58-4.
- Fernquest, Jon (Spring 2005). "The Flight of Lao War Captives from Burma back to Laos in 1596: A Comparison of Historical Sources" (PDF). SOAS Bulletin of Burma Research. 3 (1). ISSN 1479-8484.
- Harvey, G. E. (1925). History of Burma: From the Earliest Times to 10 March 1824. London: Frank Cass & Co. Ltd.
- Htin Aung, Maung (1967). A History of Burma. New York and London: Cambridge University Press.
- Kala, U (2006) [1724]. Maha Yazawin (in Burmese). Vol. 1–3 (4th printing ed.). Yangon: Ya-Pyei Publishing.
- Lieberman, Victor B. (2003). Strange Parallels: Southeast Asia in Global Context, c. 800–1830, volume 1, Integration on the Mainland. Cambridge University Press. ISBN 978-0-521-80496-7.
- Ratchasomphan (Sænluang.) (1994). David K. Wyatt (ed.). The Nan Chronicle. SEAP Publications. ISBN 9780877277156.
- Royal Historians of Burma (1960) [c. 1680]. U Hla Tin (Hla Thamein) (ed.). Zatadawbon Yazawin. Historical Research Directorate of the Union of Burma.
- Royal Historical Commission of Burma (2003) [1832]. Hmannan Yazawin (in Burmese). Vol. 1–3. Yangon: Ministry of Information, Myanmar.
- Than Tun (1983–1990). The Royal Orders of Burma, A.D. 1598–1885. Vol. 1–10. Kyoto: Kyoto University.

Nyaungyan Min Toungoo dynasty Born: 8 November 1555 Died: 5 November 1605
Regnal titles
Preceded by Nanda	King of Burma; 19 December 1599 – 5 November 1605	Succeeded by Anaukpetlun
Preceded by Baya Yawda and Let-Yway-Gyi Myin-Hmu as Co-Administrators (Acting Co-Governors)	King of Ava; 19 April 1597 – 19 December 1599	Succeeded by Minye Uzana as self-styled King
Royal titles
Preceded by Shin Ubote	Governor of Nyaungyan; 8 February 1581 – 19 April 1597	Succeeded by
