= Minye Kyawswa (disambiguation) =

Minye Kyawswa (also spelled Minyekyawswa) is a Burmese royal title used in the days of Burmese monarchy, and usually refers to Crown Prince Minye Kyawswa of Ava (1391–1415).

Others that also wore the title were:

- Minye Kyawswa I of Ava: King of Ava (r. 1439–42)
- Minye Kyawswa II of Prome: Governor of Prome (r. 1417–22; 1442–46)
- Nanda: King of Burma (r. 1581–99)
- Minye Kyawswa of Yamethin: Viceroy of Yamethin
- Minye Kyawswa II of Ava: Viceroy of Ava (1587–93), Heir-apparent of Burma (r. 1593–99)
- Minye Kyawswa of Sagu: Heir-apparent of Burma (r. 1629–47)
