= List of rulers of Ava =

This is a list of viceroys and governors of Ava (Inwa) for periods in which it was not the capital of Upper Burma-based kingdoms. This is not a list of monarchs of Ava who ruled from Ava during five separate periods (1365–1555, 1599–1613, 1635–1752, 1765–1783, 1821–1842). The dates after 1582 are on the Gregorian calendar.

== List ==
Name	Term From	Term Until	Relationship to predecessor(s)	Overlord	Notes
Thohanbwa	25 March 1527	c. January 1533	Appointed	Sawlon	Viceroy (officially styled as King of Ava)
Thado Minsaw	19 February 1555	24 April 1584 NS	Appointed	Bayinnaung (1555–1581); Nanda (1581–1584)	Viceroy (styled as King of Ava); in revolt (1583–1584)
Min Letya	May 1584	September/October 1586	Appointed	Nanda	Governor
Minye Kyawswa II	5 February 1587	29 December 1593	Appointed	Nanda	Viceroy
Baya Yawda and Let-Yway-Gyi Myin-Hmu	29 December 1593	19 April 1597	Appointed	Nanda	Co-administrators
Nyaungyan	19 April 1597 (Note: (Than Tun Vol. 2 1985: 11) Nyaungyan declared that Ava would be his new capital, and the abandoned city would be rebuilt for his official move on 29 August 1597 NS.)	19 December 1599 (Note: Date of Nanda's fall from power given. Nyaungyan officially proclaimed himself king on 25 February 1600 (Friday, 12th waxing of Tabaung 961 ME) per (Hmannan Vol. 3 2003: 122).)	Seized	Nanda	Nominally viceroy of Ava but technically in revolt of Nanda (1597–99)
Zetayit	18 August 1604		Appointed	Nyaungyan	Mayor
Minye Uzana	2 November 1620	16 December 1628	Appointed	Anaukpetlun	Mayor (1620–28) in revolt as self-styled King of Ava between 4 September 1628 and 16 December 1628
Min Nyo	6 December 1628	19 August 1630	Appointed	Minye Deibba	Governor
Talaban	April 1752	3 January 1754	Appointed	Binnya Dala	Governor-general, vassal of Restored Hanthawaddy
Hsinbyushin	3 January 1754	28 November 1763	Appointed	Alaungpaya (1752–1760); Naungdawgyi (1760–1763)	Heir-apparent (1760–1763)

== See also ==
- List of Burmese monarchs
- List of heirs to the Burmese thrones
- List of rulers of Martaban
- List of rulers of Pegu
- List of rulers of Prome
- List of rulers of Toungoo

== Bibliography ==
- Kala, U (2006) [1724]. Maha Yazawin (in Burmese). Vol. 1–3 (4th printing ed.). Yangon: Ya-Pyei Publishing.
- Royal Historical Commission of Burma (2003) [1832]. Hmannan Yazawin (in Burmese). Vol. 1–3. Yangon: Ministry of Information, Myanmar.
- Than Tun (1985). The Royal Orders of Burma, A.D. 1598–1885. Vol. 2. Kyoto University. hdl:2433/173789.
