= Thiri Maha Dhamma Yaza Dipadi Dewi =

Thiri Maha Dhamma Yaza Dipadi Dewi သီရိ မဟာ ဓမ္မရာဇာ ဓိပတိ ဒေဝီ

Chief queen consort of Burma
- Tenure: 19 December 1599 – 5 November 1605
- Coronation: 25 February 1600
- Predecessor: Hanthawaddy Mibaya
- Successor: Atula Sanda Dewi I
- Born: c. 1560
- Died: c. 1610s
- Spouse: Nyaungyan
- Issue: Anaukpetlun; Thalun; Min Taya Medaw; Thakin Phyu
- House: Toungoo
- Father: Bayinnaung
- Mother: Shin Htwe Myat
- Religion: Theravada Buddhism

Thiri Maha Dhamma Yaza Dipadi Dewi (Burmese: သီရိ မဟာ ဓမ္မရာဇာဓိပတိ ဒေဝီ, pronounced [θìɹḭ məhà dəma̰jàzà dḭpədḭ dèwì]; Pali: Sirimahārājadhipatidevī; born Khin Hpone Myint ခင်ဘုန်းမြင့်, [kʰɪ̀ɴ pʰóʊɴ mjɪ̰ɴ]) was the chief queen consort of King Nyaungyan of Toungoo Dynasty of Burma (Myanmar). She married her half-brother Nyaungyan on 25 February 1577. Note that her personal name is sometimes reported as "Khin Hpone Myat". (Note: Both (Maha Yazawin Vol. 3 2006: 61) and (Hmannan Vol. 3 2003: 42) say that he married Khin Hpone Myat on 9th waxing of Tabodwe 938 ME (25 February 1577). But the name Khin Hpone Myat is most probably a typographical error. Hmannan's detailed list of Bayinnaung's issue (Hmannan Vol. 3 2003: 68) shows that her name was "Khin Hpone Myint", daughter of Shin Htwe Myat. The complete list (Hmannan Vol. 3 2003: 68–73) does include two other daughters named Khin Hpone Myat; the first Khin Hpone Myat, daughter of Khin Gyi Sit, was married to Sithu, Gov. of Mawlamyaing, and the second Khin Hpone Myat, daughter of Khin Htwe Phyu, to Ottamarit, Gov. of Sagaing.)

The couple had four children:

- Thakin Lat: King of Burma (r. 1605–28)
- Thakin Gyi: King of Burma (r. 1629–48)
- Min Taya Medaw: Queen of Burma (r. 1609–28) (Note: (Maha Yazawin Vol. 3 2006: 134): She was raised as the chief queen of her full brother Thakin Lat (King Anaukpetlun) on 8 February 1609.)
- Thakin Phyu: Crown Prince of Burma (r. 1635–47).

== Bibliography ==
- Kala, U (1724). Maha Yazawin (in Burmese). Vol. 1–3 (2006, 4th printing ed.). Yangon: Ya-Pyei Publishing.
- Royal Historical Commission of Burma (1832). Hmannan Yazawin (in Burmese). Vol. 1–3 (2003 ed.). Yangon: Ministry of Information, Myanmar.

Thiri Maha Dhamma Yaza Dipadi Dewi Toungoo Dynasty Born: c. 1560 Died: c. 1610s
Royal titles
Preceded by Hanthawaddy Mibaya	Chief queen consort of Burma; 19 December 1599 – 5 November 1605	Succeeded by Atula Sanda Dewi I
