= Min Letya of Ava =

Min Letya မင်းလက်ျာ

Governor of Ava
- Reign: May 1584 – September/October 1586
- Predecessor: Thado Minsaw (Viceroy)
- Successor: Minye Kyawswa II (Viceroy)
- Born: c. 1540
- Died: September/October 1586 (Note: (Maha Yazawin Vol. 3: 85): Thadingyut 948 ME = 12 September 1286 to 10 October 1286 NS); Thadingyut 948 ME; Ava (Inwa)
- Issue: Minye Kyawswa; Khin Me (daughter)
- House: Toungoo
- Father: Tabinshwehti
- Mother: ?
- Religion: Theravada Buddhism

Min Letya (Burmese: မင်းလက်ျာ, pronounced [mɪ́ɴ lɛʔ jà]; died 1586) was governor of Ava (Inwa) from 1584 to 1586 during the reign of King Nanda of Toungoo Dynasty of Burma (Myanmar). Min Letya was the only son of King Tabinshwehti mentioned in the Burmese chronicles. (Note: Since the chronicles do not mention who his mother was, his mother may have been a minor queen or concubine.)

Letya was appointed governor of Ava (Inwa) in May 1584 by Nanda. His appointment came after the king had put down a serious rebellion by Thado Minsaw, the viceroy of Ava on 24 April 1584 and after the king had been informed of a rebellion by Siam in May 1584. The office was strictly a non-hereditary governorship, not the viceroyship Thado Minsaw enjoyed. It reflected Nanda's desire not to have a strong ruler in Upper Burma to be in a position to challenge him while he dealt with Siam. Letya loyally administered Upper Burma without incident until he died in October 1586. He was succeeded by Minye Kyawswa II, a son of Nanda, as viceroy.

Letya had at least one daughter named Khin Me (ခင်မည်း), who later became a minor queen of King Nyaungyan.

== Bibliography ==
- Kala, U (2006) [1724]. Maha Yazawin (in Burmese). Vol. 1–3 (4th printing ed.). Yangon: Ya-Pyei Publishing.

Min Letya of Ava Toungoo Dynasty Born: c. 1540 Died: September/October 1586
Royal titles
Preceded by Thado Minsaw as Viceroy of Ava	Governor of Ava; May 1584 – September/October 1586	Succeeded by Minye Kyawswa II as Viceroy of Ava
