= Anaukpetlun =

King of Taungoo Burma (1605–1628)

Anaukpetlun; အနောက်ဘက်လွန်
- King of Toungoo

King of Burma
- Reign: 5 November 1605 – 9 July 1628
- Predecessor: Nyaungyan
- Successor: Minyedeippa
- Born: 21 January 1578; Tuesday, 14th waxing of Tabodwe 939 ME
- Died: 9 July 1628 (aged 50); Thursday, 8th waxing of 1st Waso 990 ME; West of Bago, Burma
- Burial: Pegu
- Consort: • Min Taya Medaw (Atula Sanda Dewi), the daughter of King Nyaungyan Min the chief queen • Khin Myo Myat, the daughter of King Nyaungyan Min • Khin Sanda, the daughter of King Nyaungyan Min • Bua Hla Wong the princess of Chiangmai the daughter of Hpone Soe Ka Zaya (Phon Suek Sai) • Khin Pan Phyu, the daughter of Yan Naing • etc
- Issue: Was born from his full-sister Min Taya Medaw (Atula Sanda Dewi), the daughter of Nyaungyan Min • Bayin Hnamadaw daughter (died at age 4 years old) * Was born from his half-sister Khin Myo Myat, the daughter of King Nyaungyan Min • Minyedeippa son • Warathura son • Minye Aung Tint son, with the rank Mogaung myoza * Was born from Khin Sanda, the daughter of King Nyaungyan Min • Myat Myo Pabha daughter * Was born from Bua Hla Wong, the daughter of Hpone Soe Ka Zaya (Phon Suek Sai) the saopha of Chiang mai • Amerawaddy daughter * Was born from Khin Pan Phyu, the daughter of Yan Naing • Shwe Nan Ein Phyo son, Gov. of Myeik * And many another
Names
- Birth name: Thakin Latt သခင်လတ်
- House: Toungoo
- Father: Nyaungyan
- Mother: Thiri Maha Dhamma Yaza Dipadi Dewi
- Religion: Theravada Buddhism

Anaukpetlun (Burmese: အနောက်ဘက်လွန် [ʔənaʊʔ pʰɛʔ lʊ̀ɰ̃], lit. "King who died in the West"; 21 January 1578 – 9 July 1628) was the sixth king of Taungoo Burma and was largely responsible for restoring the kingdom after it collapsed at the end of the 16th century. In his 22-year reign from 1606 to 1628, Anaukpetlun completed the reunification efforts begun by his father, King Nyaungyan. Having inherited a partial kingdom comprising mainly Upper Burma and the Shan States from his father, Anaukpetlun went on to reconquer Lan Na in the east, and in the south, Lower Burma from rival Burmese factions and the Portuguese, as well as the Upper Tenasserim from the Ayutthaya Kingdom. The kingdom was known as the Restored Taungoo Kingdom or Nyaungyan Dynasty.

== Life ==
Anaukpetlun had chief queen, principal queens and minors queens, more than 50 persons and had children more than 80-100, the names list included in Maha Yazawin and Nyaungyan Mintaya Ayedawbon and U-Kala chronicle.

Officially styled as Maha Dhamma Yaza, Anaukpetlun was a grandson of Bayinnaung. Both of his parents were children of Bayinnaung, half-brother and half-sister. In November 1605, Nyaungyan died after a military campaign to Hsenwi. Anaukpetlun then inherited the Kingdom of Ava that included all north of Bagan along the Irrawaddy River and the cis-Salween Shan States.

Anaukpetlun pursued his campaigns to unify the Burmese kingdom. In 1608, he took Prome (modern Pyay), installing his brother Thalun as the King of Prome.

In 1610 he took Taungoo from Natshinnaung and forced the king to swear loyalty. However, Filipe de Brito e Nicote, the Portuguese ruler of Syriam (modern Thanlyin) marched to Taungoo and captured Natshinnaung.

Anaukpetlun then marched the Ava armies and fleets to capture Syriam and rescued the King of Toungoo but faced Rakhine opportunistic invasions. He was able to counter the Rakhine fleets and took the port of Syriam in 1613, though Nat Shin Naung had already died. Anaukpetlun took the European-Portuguese captives to Ava and Bago, where they were known as Bayingyi and served as gunners for the Burmese armies later.

In 1617, Anaukpetlun decided to make Bago the capital of his dominions and crowned himself as King of Bago that year.

In 1613–1614, Anaukpetlun attacked Dawei, Tenasserim and Chiang Mai but was repelled. In 1618 Siam and Burma reached an agreement in which Burma would control Mottama and Thailand would control Chiang Mai.

In 1624, Anaukpetlun sent his brother Thalun to curb the rebellion of Chiang Saen and Nan.

In 1628, Anaukpetlun was assassinated at his pavilion in Nat Ywa Shin's village, located on the western bank of the Irrawaddy River. He was shot in the neck with an arrow by a fisherman named Shin Than Kho, who was romantically involved with Anaukpetlun's son, Minyedeippa. The assassination was orchestrated by Minyedeippa, who feared potential punishment due to his relationship with နှင့်ခမ်းပေါ Ning (Nang) Hkam Pao, the daughter of Chao Kiang Hkam, the Sawbwa of Kengtung. Notably, Ning Hkam Pao was also one of Anaukpetlun's minor queens.

Following Anaukpetlun's death, Minyedeippa briefly ascended the throne but was ousted by Thalun in August 1630. According to historian Harvey, Minyedeippa was executed by Thalun in November 1630. However, the U Kala Chronicle presents a different account, claiming that Minyedeippa received support from numerous princesses of Chiangmai. This support allegedly prevented Thalun from executing him and weakened Thalun's control over Hanthawaddy. As a result, Thalun was compelled to relocate the capital to Ava in 1634, while Minyedeippa reportedly continued to live in Hanthawaddy.

== Family ==
Anaukpetlun had only one principal queen and she was his chief queen too, the chief queen was his full-sister name Min Taya Medaw the daughter of King Nyaungyan Min was born from Nyaungyan Min's chief queen Khin Hpone Myint, he has only one daughter with his chief queen who died at age 4 years old

Queen	Rank	Issue
Min Taya Medaw	Chief Queen (Mibaya Kaung Gyi) Atula Sanda Dewi	1. Bayin Hnamadaw (daughter) died at age 4 years old she has her poem in égyin name Bayin Hnamadaw égyin

Anaukpetlun had 40 junior queens who had issue.

Name	Mother	Brief
1. Amerawaddy	Bua Hla Wongs, the daughter of Hpone Thuka Zaya (Phon Suek Sai)	Daughter
2. Minyedeippa	Shin Myo Myat, the daughter of Nyaungyan Min	Son became the King
3. Warathura	Shin Myo Myat, the daughter of Nyaungyan Min	Son
4. Minye Aung Din	Shin Myo Myat, the daughter of Nyaungyan Min	Son Mogaung's eat
5. Myat Myo Pabha	Khin Sanda, the daughter of Nyaungyan Min	Daughter
6. Taningandwe	Thwin Kyaing-Ye Mibaya, Sruang Hpa, the daughter of Naw Kham Hset Thin (Naw Kham Sathien), the Gov.of Thwin Kyaing-Ye	Son
7. Pyinsa Thiha	Pyinsa Thila, the daughter of Minye Kyawswa of Sidoktaya, lineage from Bagan dynasty	Son died at age 13 years old
8. Minye Aung Naing	Pyinsa Thila, the daughter of Minye Kyawswa of Sidoktaya, lineage from Bagan dynasty	Son Gov.of Mabe married to his half-sister Chamèna Yathi
9. Shwe Inthi	Pyinsa Thila, the daughter of Minye Kyawswa of Sidoktaya, lineage from Bagan dynasty	Daughter married to her half-brother Min Dala
10. Phakhani Bon	Manithalanyi, the daughter of Yuzana Kyawhtin of Sidoktaya	Daughter
11. Min Dala	Sao Nang Khueng Kham, the daughter of Kan Lang Hpa, the Saopha of Pa-Lwe	Son Gov.of Yawt Oo in Linzin married to his half-sister Shwe Inthi
12. Bayin Minkhaung	Sao Nang Oo Kyè Mueng, the daughter of Thakin Kaw Nyo, the Saopha of Wuntho	Son
13. Thilawathit	Sao Nang Oo Kyè Mueng, the daughter of Thakin Kaw Nyo, the Saopha of Wuntho	Son
14. Minye Teitta	Sao Nang Nwe Hkam Sein, the daughter of Pha Ing Hpa, the Saopha of Namsan	Son Gov.of Kyaukmaw in Minyedeippa's reign
15. Min Kin Shwe Kutha	Sao Nang Nwe Hkam Sein, the daughter of Pha Ing Hpa, the Saopha of Namsan	Daughter married to Minye Kyawswa of Sagu, the viceroy in Thalun's reign
16. Chamèna Yathi	Bagan Minthami Lay, Shin Htwe Mun Dok, the daughter of Bagan Thura Kyantote	Daughter married to her half-brother Minye Aung Naing, the Gov.of Mabe
17. Pawara Chit	Bagan Minthami Lay, Shin Htwe Mun Dok, the daughter of Bagan Thura Kyantote	Son Gov.of Talokmyo in Minyedeippa's reign
18. Manura In Sein	Mani Pauk Thanlan, the younger sister of Saw Pyi Kyantha from Depayin	Daughter
19. Min Digga	Min Tone Hla, the younger sister of Taminsawkarat	Son
20. Sit Pan Thu	Loneképin Minthami, Supana Dewi the daughter of Saw San, the Saopha of Loneképin	Son Gov.of Myinsaing
21. Saw Pyit Sunt	Kyaingsan Minthami, Thipwika, the daughter of Hkam Thaen Hpa, the Gov.of Kyaingsan	Son Gov.of Longkor married to his cousin Khin Me Ya Min the daughter of Minyedeippa the King of Zinme
22. Ne Myo Dathta	Nang King Kham, the daughter of Thao Kham Daun, the King of Möng Puan	Son
23. Naradeippa	Manibon, the daughter of Aiyakawangso, the King of Linzin	Son Gov.of Turai
24. Zeyanara	Tira Hka, the daughter of Hkam Ting Hpa, the Saopha of Koshanpye Möng Myen	Son
25. Zatayit	Kyantayapha, the daughter of Hkam Sai Hpa, the Saopha of Hua Khong	Son Gov.of Inwa married to his half-sister Min Taya Waddy
26. Thein Shwal Hti	Kyantayapha, the daughter of Hkam Sai Hpa, the Saopha of Hua Khong	Daughter
27. Zeyanurak	Mani Rung, the daughter of Thao Wen Hkam, the Saopha of Kengtawng	Son
28. Min Taya Waddy	Supaphawaddy, the daughter of Hso Pat Hpa, the Saopha of Keng Hkam	Daughter married to her half-brother Zatayit
29. Khin Hla Ma Myo Pyoe	Nang Kyè Hak, the daughter of Hso Haw Hpa, the Saopha of Lawksawk	Daughter
30. Wara Thiha	Khin Ma Pwi Lone (b) Nang Hkam Mui the daughter of Hso Hung Hpa, the Saopha of Nawngmawn	Son Gov.of Taungbalu
31. Waradhammas	Eindra Khin Hpa, the daughter of Hso Hung Hpa, the Saopha of Mongmit	Son Gov.of Pindale married to his half-sister Sutupangwaddy
32. Sutupangwaddy	Nang Chiang Muen aka Saet Phloo Oua Phlat Bai Saw, the daughter of Hkun Phyak Hpa, the Gov.of Möngphyak	Daughter married to her half-brother Waradhammas
33. Kinnara Dewi	Nang Hkam Mung, the daughter of Thao Naw Möng, the Saopha of Koshanpye Möng Haeng	Daughter
34. Khin Myaw Myo	Sao Nang Hseng Santa, the daughter of Hso Kyaung Hpa, the Saopha of Möng Mao	Son Gov.of Thandwe
35. Arekhaushti	Thiri Mingala Dewi Champachuli, the daughter of Khagamba the Saopha of Kathe	Son Gov. of Myene
36. Dusantawaddy	Thiri Mingala Dewi Champachuli, the daughter of Khagamba the Saopha of Kathe	Daughter
37. Saw Hla Mone	Amithada, the daughter of Abdulra Ngim, the muslim	Son Gov.of Thaton
38. Minye Kutha	Chow Hnin Mei, the daughter of Hso Hkawng Hpa, the Saopha of Mohnyin	Son
39. Khin Ma Im Min Phyu	Kan Hkam Hsawng, the daughter of Hso Kyaung Hpa, the Saopha of Möng Mao	Daughter
40. Kyaung Nat Kyaw Htit	Alousmosi, the daughter of Shin Thar Lay Hnaung of Taungbalu	Son Gov.of Mekkhaya married to Myat Hna Thiwasa, the daughter of King Nyaungyan Min
41. Ma Hpone Thu Hla Dewi	Myat Shin Ne, the daughter of Nat Pin Ne, Ekabat Wun	Daughter married to Shin Wara Theinda, the Gov.of Kandwin, the son of King Nyaungyan Min
42. Ma Gyi Thiwa Thu	Myat Nge Pa Bon, the daughter of Nan Sheik Kyawthu	Daughter married to Shin Wara Theinda, the Gov.of Kandwin, the son of King Nyaungyan Min
43. A-Nat Pin Ne	Khin Ma A-Yon, the daughter of Nan Din Kayaung Hta	Daughter married to Khin Ayon Phyo the Gov.of Zeyawaddy, the son of King Nyaungyan Min
44. Shin Shwe Wa (Shwe Saw Khet)	Shin Atula, the daughter of Thippapulaythinkhaha, the Saopha of Bawlakhe	Son Gov.of Myawaddy in King Minyedeippa's reign
45. Mi Pan Phya	Nang Han Lung Naw, the daughter of Hso Kyaw Hpa, the Saopha of Thaungdut	Daughter
46. Min Than Phyu	Shin Shwe Da Pyi, the younger sister of the cavalry Pyi Ne Thurathiha	Son Gov.of Sidoktaya
47. Manithala	Shin Shwe Da Pyi, the younger sister of the cavalry Pyi Ne Thurathiha	Daughter, beauties fleur in the Bagan dynasty
48. Shin Thant Me (Nat Shin Me)	May Tha Oo, the daughter of Khin Nwin Hnaung of Moksobo	Daughter
49. Thiri Mone Yathi	Mongpan Mibaya, Me Yon Rung, the daughter of Thao Hkam Htee aka Hso Ngan Hpa, the Saopha of Mong Pan	Son Gov.of Meiktila
50. Amè Nyunt Sauk (Me May Hla)	Mong Pan Mibaya, Me Yon Rung, the daughter of Thao Hkam Htee aka Hso Ngan Hpa, the Saopha of Mongpan	Daughter
51. Shwe Nan Ein Phyu	Khin Pan Phyu, the daughter of Pyay Yannaing	Son Gov. of Myeik

Anaukpetlun Toungoo Dynasty Born: 21 January 1578 Died: 9 July 1628
Regnal titles
Preceded by Nyaungyan	King of Burma; 5 November 1605 – 9 July 1628	Succeeded by Minyedeippa
Royal titles
Preceded by Minye Kyawswa II of Ava	Heir-apparent of Burma; 25 February 1600 – 5 November 1605	Succeeded by Thalun
