= Pindale Min =

Pindale Min ပင်းတလဲမင်း
- King of Toungoo, Prince of Pindale, Pindale King

King of Burma
- Reign: 27 August 1648 – 3 June 1661
- Coronation: 19 October 1648; 3rd waxing of Tazaungmon 1010 ME
- Predecessor: Thalun
- Successor: Pye
- Born: 23 March 1608; Sunday, 6th waxing of Late Tagu 969 ME
- Died: 3 June 1661 (aged 53); Friday, 7th waxing of Nayon 1023 ME; Chindwin River
- Burial: Chindwin River (drowned)
- Consort: Atula Sanda Dewi
- Issue: Thiri Hpone Htut; Minye Theikhathu
Names
- Birth name: Thakin Kyaw; Minye Nandameit (မင်းရဲနန္ဒမိတ်)
- House: Toungoo
- Father: Thalun
- Mother: Khin Myo Sit
- Religion: Theravada Buddhism

Pindale Min (Burmese: ပင်းတလဲမင်း, pronounced [pɪ́ɰ̃dəlɛ́ mɪ́ɰ̃]; 23 March 1608 – 3 June 1661) was king of the Toungoo dynasty of Burma (Myanmar) from 1648 to 1661. Prince of Pindale ascended to the Burmese throne after his father King Thalun died in 1648. Pindale's ineffectual reign was the beginning of the gradual decline of Toungoo dynasty over the next century.

The Yongli Emperor of Southern Ming established himself at Kunming in Yunnan and extracted tribute from Chiang Hung. The Burmese armies under his brother Pye the King of Prome were sent north to claim Chiang Hung but failed. Then there were omens and rumors that there would be two kings in Burma. Yongli was eventually driven out of Yunnan and fled to Bhamo, requesting Burmese alliance. Pindale granted the residence to the Ming Emperor at Sagaing along with his officials.

However, the Qing promptly amassed the troops into Burma to capture the last Ming prince. The Kingdom of Ava was largely plundered and Ava was laid siege. However, the siege was unsuccessful due to the defense provided by the Bayingyi – the Portuguese gunners. The Qing invasions had burnt the Burmese farms in Ava and resulted in famine and Pindale lost his popularity. His brother Pye then staged a coup and took the throne, drowning Pindale, his chief queen, son and grandson in a river.

== Family ==
Pindalè had 12 children from chief queens and others

Name	Mother	Brief
1. Thiri Hpone Htut	Atula Sanda Dewi, the chief queen	Daughter married with Narazeya Gov.of Salin, the son of King Thalun
2. Died young	Atula Sanda Dewi, the chief queen	Son
3. Khin San Waddy	Khin Htun	Daughter
4. Hsinsanwaddy	Khin Hnin Pan, the niece of Bala Kyawthu	Daughter
5. Wounnawaddy	Khin Htun Hsan, the daughter of Shin Ye Thiba the son of Minye Yandathu	Daughter
6. Thiri Hpone Htin	Khin Htun Hsan, the daughter of Shin Ye Thiba the son of Minye Yandathu	Son Gov.of Kyan-Nyaep, he hide in the water because inappropriate to come back
7. Phyo Pyi Myat Kyaw	Khin Chan the daughter of Tat Taw Shyi	Son Gov.of Kyauk Pan Taung, he hide in the water because inappropriate to live in Hanthawaddy
8. Yadana Shwebon	Ywa Tha Kataw, the daughter of Letya Binanthu	Daughter
9. Mintha Phyu	Ywa Tha Kataw, the daughter of Letya Binanthu	Son Gov.of Myedu assassinated by his servant when living in Hanthawaddy
10. Gansawaddy	Khin Myat Myo	Daughter
11. Thukhawaddy	Khin Myo Myat, the daughter of Maung Pu	Daughter
12. Zalathawaddy	the daughter of Yaza Dewa Yanpya Htaunghmu of Toungoo	Daughter

== Bibliography ==
- Kala, U (1724). Maha Yazawin (in Burmese). Vol. 1–3 (2006, 4th printing ed.). Yangon: Ya-Pyei Publishing.
- Lieberman, Victor B. (1984). Burmese Administrative Cycles: Anarchy and Conquest, c. 1580–1760. Princeton University Press. ISBN 0-691-05407-X.
- Phayre, Lt. Gen. Sir Arthur P. (1883). History of Burma (1967 ed.). London: Susil Gupta.
- Royal Historical Commission of Burma (1829–1832). Hmannan Yazawin (in Burmese). Vol. 1–3 (2003 ed.). Yangon: Ministry of Information, Myanmar.

Pindale Min Toungoo Dynasty Born: 23 March 1608 Died: 3 June 1661
Regnal titles
Preceded by Thalun	King of Burma; 27 August 1648 – 3 June 1661	Succeeded by Pye
Royal titles
Preceded by Minye Kyawswa II of Toungoo	Heir to the Burmese Throne; 18 August 1647–27 August 1648	Succeeded by Minye Thihathu of Salin
