= Hkamti =

Hkamti, Khampti or Khamti may refer to:

- Khamti people, a sub-group of the Shan people
- Khamti language, a Tai language of Burma and India
- Hkamti District, a district in Sagaing Division of Burma
  - Hkamti Township, a township in Hkamti District
  - Hkamti, Myanmar, a town in Hkamti Township
- Singaling Hkamti, one of the outlying Shan states
- Hkamti Long, one of the outlying Shan states

== See also ==
- Khamtai Siphandon, a former president of Laos
