= Man Maw, Bhamo =

- Location in Burma (Myanmar)
- Coordinates: 24°33′N 97°7′E
- Country: Burma
- State: Kachin State
- District: Bhamo District
- Township: Bhamo Township

Population
  - Religions: Buddhism
- Time zone: UTC+6.30 (UTC + 6:30)

Man Maw is a village in Bhamo Township in Bhamo District in the Kachin State of north-eastern Burma.

== History ==
Wanmaw (Bhamo) was the name and capital (royal seat) of a relatively major one of the petty Shan (ethnic Tai) principalities, ruled by a saopha (Burmese: sawbwa; Shan-prince of the highest rank), since that state was founded in 1470 until its annexation in 1772 by the Ava-based kingdom of Burma, which had occupied it previously in 1669-1685 and 1767–1770.

== Sources ==
- WorldStatesMen - Burma/Myanmar - Shan&Karen states (which lists the last rulers)
