= Khin Pyezon =

Khin Pyezon ခင်ပြည့်စုံ

Queen of Burma
- Tenure: c. 1553 – 1581
- Born: c. 1530s
- Spouse: Bayinnaung
- Issue: Shin Ubote; Nyaungyan
- House: Toungoo
- Religion: Theravada Buddhism

Khin Pyezon (Burmese: ခင်ပြည့်စုံ, pronounced [kʰɪ̀ɴ pjḛ zòʊɴ]; also spelled Hkinpyison) was a minor queen of King Bayinnaung of Toungoo Dynasty. She was the mother of King Nyaungyan (r. 1599–1605).

== Bibliography ==
- Harvey, G. E. (1925). History of Burma: From the Earliest Times to 10 March 1824. London: Frank Cass & Co. Ltd.
- Royal Historical Commission of Burma (1832). Hmannan Yazawin (in Burmese). Vol. 1–3 (2003 ed.). Yangon: Ministry of Information, Myanmar.

Khin Pyezon Toungoo Dynasty Born: c. 1530s
Royal titles
Preceded by	Queen of Burma c. 1553 – 1581	Succeeded by
