= Zeyawaddy =

Zeyawaddy ဇေယျဝတီ Zeyawadi
- City
- Location of Zeyawaddy (Zeyawadi), Bago (Pegu), Burma
- Coordinates: 18°32′N 96°25′E
- Country: Burma (Myanmar)
- Division: Bago (Pegu)
- Township: Phyu (Pyu)
- City: Zeyawaddy

Population (2010)
  - Ethnicities: Bamar Burmese Indians
  - Religions: Buddhism Hinduism
- Time zone: UTC+6:30 (MST)

Zeyawaddy (Burmese: ဇေယျဝတီ) is a small town located 215 kilometres (134 mi) north of Rangoon, Burma.

With the view of transferring population from densely populated regions of Bihar & Northern Provinces( Uttar Pradesh to waste lands/jungles of Burma, the British Government offered large tracts of land in Burma by way of Grants, to big Indian Zamindars & Princely States to take up the migration work. Invitations were sent to the Maharaja of Dumraon as well as to the Dewan of Dumraon State. While the Maharaja declined the offer, Dewan Jai Prakash Lall C.I.E. accepted the offer and was granted 18340 acres of land in Zayawaddy region in Myanmar by the British Empire. Dewan Jai Prakash Lall C.I.E. & his son Rai Bahadur Harihar Prasad Singh took neighboring people from Bihar & Northern Provinces to Myanmar and let them cut and clean the forest in that land and allowed them to grow paddy & sugar cane to earn living.

In 1934-35 a sugar mill, bought from Britain was set up by Rai Bahadur Harihar Prasad Singh & his son, Mr. Chandradeva Prakash Sinha. The mill had a capacity of 1000 tons per year initially, which was expanded to 2,500 tons before the second World War. The mill was the largest sugar mill in Burma of the time. New machinery was also bought during the war days to further expand capacity. The sugar factory had been running till 1952-53.

In 1954 the mill was nationalized by the Myanmar Government and the factory was run by the Government thereafter.
