= Thalun =

Thado Dhammaraza Thalun သာလွန်
- King of Toungoo
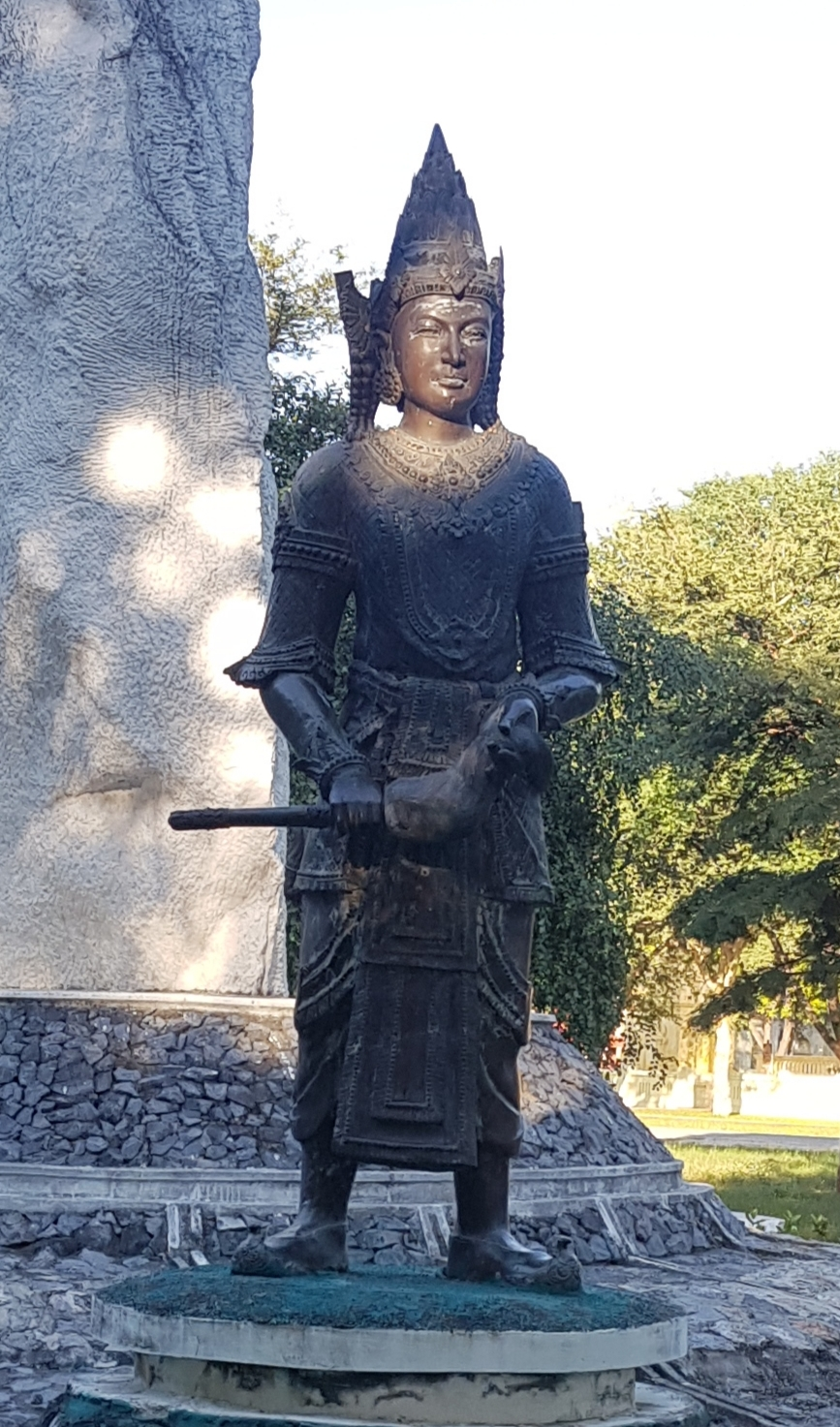
- The statute of king Thalun in Mandalay Palace

King of Burma
- Reign: 19 August 1630 – 27 August 1648
- Predecessor: Minyedeippa
- Successor: Pindale
- Born: 17 June 1584; Sunday, 5th waxing of Nayon 946 ME
- Died: 27 August 1648 (aged 64); Thursday, 10th waning of Tawthalin 1010 ME; Ava (Inwa)
- Burial: 29 August 1648; Inwa Palace
- Consort: 13 queens • Khin Myo Sit • Khin Thet Hnin of Mone (Sinthumala the daughter of Sao Hla Hkam, the sawbwa of Mone) • Khin Myat Hset of Pinya
- Issue: 12 sons and 9 daughters including: • Ne Myo Ye Kyaw son • Khin Ma Min Sit daughter
Names
- Birth name: Minye Theinkhathu
- House: Toungoo
- Father: Nyaungyan
- Mother: Khin Hpone Myat
- Religion: Theravada Buddhism

Thalun (Burmese: သာလွန်မင်း, pronounced [θàlʊ̀ɰ̃]; 17 June 1584 – 27 August 1648) was the eighth king of Toungoo dynasty of Burma (Myanmar). During his 19-year reign, Thalun successfully rebuilt the war-torn country which had been under constant warfare for nearly a century since the 1530s. Thalun instituted many administrative reforms and rebuilt the economy of the kingdom.

In 1608, Anaukpetlun captured Prome and made Thalun the governor of Prome. In 1628, Anaukpetlun was murdered by his own son Minyedeippa who made himself king. Thalun was then on his campaigns against the Shans at Kengtung with his brother Minye Kyawswa II, the governor of Ava. However, the death of Anaukpetlun forced the two to return to Pegu to claim the throne from the unlawful king and to counter the opportunistic Arakanese invasions. Thalun became the center of rallying against Minyedaikpa and was proclaimed the crown prince.

In 1630, Thalun and Minye Kyawswa were able to take Pegu and executed Minyedeippa. At Pegu, there was an assassination attempt by a Mon on King Thalun, which resulted in the massacre of the Mons.

Thalun fought a three-year campaign against Lanna, finally subjugating them in 1632. In 1634, Thalun moved the capital to Ava and crowned himself king of Ava and made his brother Minye Kyawswa crown prince, Maha Uparaja. Thalun then concentrated on building pagodas and other works of merit.

However, Minye Kyawswa died on 28 August 1648. Thalun then made his own son Pindale as the crown prince. The son of Minye Kyawswa who wanted the crown prince title for himself staged a rebellion. The palace was sacked and Thalun fled to Sagaing. However, the rebellion was soon put down and the conspirators were burnt alive. Thalun died on 19 October 1648, succeeded by his son Pindale.

== Family ==
Thalun had one chief-queen, one principal queen and ten junior queens who give birth children. Most of them a noble's daughter More than a royal family.

Name	Mother	Brief
1. Minye Narathiha	Khin Thet Hnin (Sinthumala), the daughter of Sao Hla Hkam, the saopha of Mone the Chief queen with rank Myauk Gyi Kadaw	Son, died at age 7 years old
2. Thakin Phyu	Khin Thet Hnin (Sinthumala), the daughter of Sao Hla Hkam, the saopha of Mone the Chief queen with rank Myauk Gyi Kadaw	Son
3. Min Phyu	Khin Thet Hnin (Sinthumala), the daughter of Sao Hla Hkam, the saopha of Mone the Chief queen with rank Myauk Gyi Kadaw	Daughter
4. Khin Ma (Shwe Sinthu)	Khin Thet Hnin (Sinthu Mala), the daughter of Sao Hla Hkam, the saopha of Mone the Chief queen with rank Myauk Gyi Kadaw	Daughter married to half-brother Ne Myo Ye Kyaw
5. Hpone Wei Lu (Thila Dewi)	Khin Myo Sit, the principal queen with the rank Myauk Nge Kadaw	Daughter married to her full-brother Thakin Kyaw Pindale
6. Thakin Kyaw Pindale	Khin Myo Sit, the principal queen with the rank Myauk Nge Kadaw	Son, Minye Nawrahta Gyi, Minye Nandameit become the King Pindale, married to full-sister Hpone Wei Lu (Thila Dewi)
7. Khin Pan Phyu	Khin Myo Sit, the principal queen with the rank Myauk Nge Kadaw	Daughter married to half-brother Thakin Phyu
8. Thakin Nyo	Khin Htwe Hla, the younger sister of Pyay Yannaing's queen, Wabo Kadaw	Son Governor of Tineta and Kanni married to Khin Phyu, the daughter of Minye Kyawswa of Sagu
9. Thakin Ne Myo Dahta	Khin Htwe Hla, the younger sister of Pyay Yannaing's queen, Wabo Kadaw	Son Governor of Tineta married to Khin Ma Shwe Pa Chop, the daughter of Minye Kyawswa of Sagu
10. Thakin Talote	Khin Hla San	Son Governor of Amyint married to half-sister Khin Ma Hsin In Pa Yoe
11. Hpone Khaing Thit	Khin Hla San	Daughter died at age 22 years old
12. Zeyawara (Shin Talout Naw)	Pinya Minthami, Khin Myat Hset	Son become the King Pye Min married to Khin Ma Lat, the daughter of Minye Mawrahta
13. Khin Ma Hsin In Pa Yoe	Shin Hla Nyi, the elder sister of Upathitha Governor of Nyaung Pin Seik	Daughter married to half brother Thakin Talout
14. Ne Myo Ye Kyaw (Minye Aung Din)	Dwantyawaddy, the daughter of Shin Yan Ngu (the nephew of Im Phyu Shin Baya Yanthameit the descendant from Pagan Kingdom) + his wife Min Lat	Son married with half-sister Shwe Sinthu and Khin Ma Min Sit, he died by shock from an overdose of marijuana, and get a nickname Siputtara Mingyi means King of Marijuana
15. Narazeya	Dwantyawaddy, the daughter of Shin Yan Ngu (the nephew of Im Phyu Shin Baya Yanthameit the descendant from Pagan Kingdom) + his wife Min Lat	Son
16. Thakin Pinya	A Htaing (Royal's friend) Nè Nyunt (Nai Rung)	Son, through the fourth level of practice dharma of Buddhist
17. Khin Ma Min Sit	Toungoo Shwe Nan, Khin Ma Shwe Nan, the daughter of Thiri Dhamma Thawka Governor of Toungoo with the rank Toungoo Myo Thit and the son of King Nanda Bayin	Daughter married with half-brother Ne Myo Ye Kyaw
18. Aggapatta	Ainnim Minthami (the royal princess) Min A-Nge daughter of Nawrahta Minsaw of Chiangmai with the title Thummana Dewi	Daughter died at age 10 years old
19. Minye Kutha	Ainnim Minthami (the royal princess) Min A-Nge daughter of Nawrahta Minsaw of Chiangmai with the title Thummana Dewi	Son,
20. Thakin Pu Phyu	Phyu Hnin Kalyar (Kaew Hnin Kalyar), the daughter of Binnya Than Lan (Phraya Sam Lan)	Son died at age 16 years old
21. Sittaya Nyunt Lao	Nai Mauk the niece of Binnya Yaza (Maybe Phraya Racharithanon) the daughter of the saopha of Chiang Saen (Phraya Luang Thipphanet)	Daughter
22.Khin Nè Ku	Yuang Kaew Mallika the daughter of Sao Ngam Möng the saopha of Möng Fang and his queen Nang Sam Phui the daughter of King Thammikarath King of Lan Xang	Daughter married to her half-brother King Pindale Min

Among of his queens one of the notable junior queen were Sao Nang Su Thar, the daughter of Sao Hswe Hking the saopha of Ounbaunglay who didn't give birth children

And all he had 22 children (twelve sons and ten daughters): three sons and four daughters by principal queens, and eight sons and six daughters by junior queens. Two of the notable children by junior queens were: Ne Myo Ye Kyaw and Khin Ma Min Sit the couple who give birth King Minye Kyawhtin the King who have the fourth level direct pedigree from King Nanda Bayin

== Notes ==
Thalun Toungoo Dynasty Born: 17 June 1584 Died: 27 August 1648
Regnal titles
Preceded by Minyedeippa	King of Burma; 19 August 1629 – 27 August 1648	Succeeded by Pindale
Royal titles
Preceded by Anaukpetlun	Heir to the Burmese Throne; 3 March 1606 – 9 July 1628	Succeeded by Minye Kyawswa II
Preceded by Yan Naing as King of Prome	Viceroy of Prome; 2 November 1620 – 9 July 1628	Succeeded by Udein Kyawhtin as Governor of Prome
