= Minye Kyawswa II of Ava =

Minye Kyawswa မင်းရဲကျော်စွာ
- Viceroy of Toungoo and Ava

Heir Apparent of Burma
- Reign: 29 December 1593 – 18 December 1599
- Predecessor: Mingyi Swa
- Successor: Anaukpetlun

Viceroy of Ava
- Reign: 5 February 1587 – 29 December 1593
- Predecessor: Min Letya (Governor)
- Successor: Baya Yawda and Let-Yway-Gyi Myin Hmu (Co-Administrators)
- Chief Minister: Baya Yawda
- Born: c. 16 November 1567; Sunday, c. 1st waning of Nadaw 929 ME; Pegu (Bago), Toungoo Empire
- Died: late December 1599 (aged 32); Pyatho 961 ME; Toungoo (Taungoo)
- Father: Nanda
- Mother: Hanthawaddy Mibaya
- Religion: Theravada Buddhism

Minye Kyawswa (Burmese: မင်းရဲကျော်စွာ, pronounced [mɪ́ɴjɛ́ tɕɔ̀zwà]; also spelled Minyekyawswa; c. 16 November 1567 – late December 1599) was heir apparent of Burma from 1593 to 1599, and viceroy of Ava from 1587 to 1593. For the last six years of his life, he was the deputy of his father King Nanda, who presided over the collapse of the Toungoo Empire. In December 1599, he betrayed his father, and defected to the forces led by Minye Thihathu II of Toungoo and Raza II of Arakan. But the promise of good treatment was not kept; the last crown prince of the Toungoo Empire was killed a few days later.

== Ancestry ==
The prince was born to Crown Prince Nanda and his chief consort Hanthawaddy Mibaya c. 16 November 1567 in Pegu (Bago). (Note: (Zata 1960: 47): He was born in the 9th month (Nadaw) of 929 ME (1 November to 29 November 1567); and because he was born on a Sunday, his birthday was any one of 2, 9, 16, and 23 November 1567.) He was the sixth child and the second son of the couple, and had six other full siblings.

Ancestry of Crown Prince Minye Kyawswa

8. Mingyi Swe
4. Bayinnaung
9. Shin Myo Myat
2. Nanda
10. Mingyi Nyo
5. Atula Thiri
11. Yadana Dewi
1. Minye Kyawswa
12. Mingyi Nyo
6. Tabinshwehti
13. Yaza Dewi
3. Hanthawaddy Mibaya
14. Mingyi Swe
7. Dhamma Dewi
15. Shin Myo Myat

== Early life ==
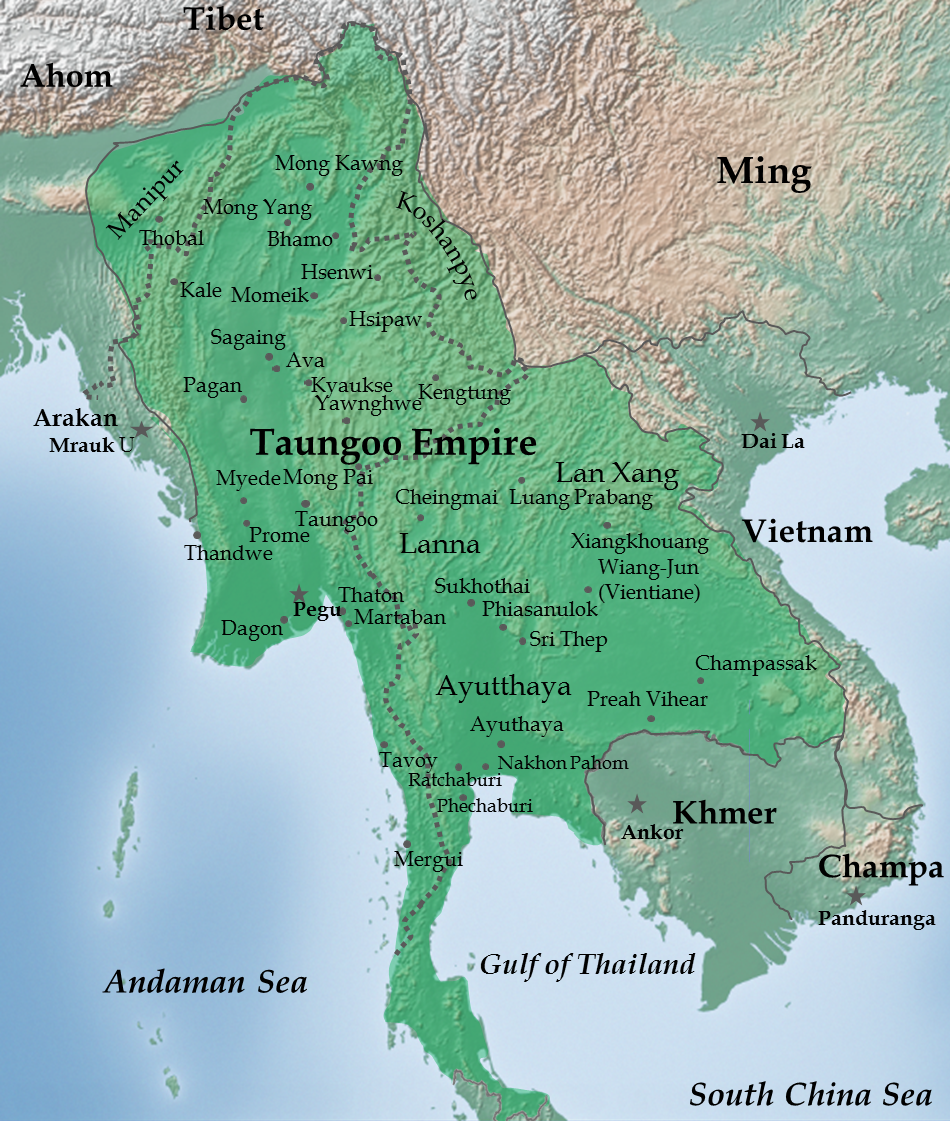
Toungoo Empire in 1580. "States as far east as Vietnam and Cambodia probably paid propitiatory homage to Bayinnaung." Chronicles also claim Cachar and much deeper parts of Yunnan, and treat the Ceylonese Kingdom of Kotte as a protectorate.

The prince grew up in Pegu during the reign of his grandfather King Bayinnaung, who had founded the largest empire in Southeast Asia. After Bayinnaung died on 10 October 1581, his father Nanda succeeded without incident. Minye Kyawswa became second in line of succession behind his elder brother Mingyi Swa, the heir-apparent.

However, the days of the empire were numbered. The new king did not have the support of his major vassals, who ruled what used to be sovereign kingdoms just a few decades earlier. By 1584, Nanda faced serious rebellions in Ava (Upper Burma) and Siam. The king relied on Mingyi Swa to keep the empire intact. Minye Kyawswa was not a factor. Unlike other senior princes of the day, he did not take part in any of the early military campaigns—Chinese Shan States (1582–83), Ava (1584), and Siam (1584, 1586).

== Viceroy of Ava ==
=== Accession ===
The prince's first major assignment came in September/October 1586. Governor Min Letya of Ava, whom Nanda appointed just two years earlier, had just died in office. The king appointed his second son by his chief queen viceroy of Ava with the title of Minye Kyawswa, effective 5 February [O.S. 26 January] 1587—the date deemed propitious by the court astrologers. To help the young prince govern Upper Burma, the king also sent along a dozen senior seasoned officials led by Baya Yawda (as chief minister), and Let-Yway-Gyi Myin Hmu (Note: Let-Yway-Gyi Myin Hmu (လက်ရွေးကြီး မြင်းမှူး) was a military rank, "Commander of Select Cavalry Corps". His personal name is not mentioned in the chronicles.) (as commander of the military).

In February 1587, Minye Kyawswa and his entourage arrived at Ava (Inwa). The new viceroy had a difficult task ahead of him: reestablish tighter control over the fractious vassal rulers throughout central and northern Burma, the Shan states and Manipur. The viceroyship appointment itself marked the end of an experiment by Nanda. Only two years earlier, the high king, who did not want another strong vassal ruler like the rebellious viceroy Thado Minsaw of Ava, experimented by appointing Min Letya only as a governor to administer the vast upcountry. (Note: (Maha Yazawin Vol. 2 2006: 82): Min Letya was appointed as wun (ဝန်), not min (မင်း).) The downside of this policy was that an administrator like Min Letya—even though he was a son of King Tabinshwehti—did not have much control over Ava's vassals, many of whom were sons of Bayinnaung. Probably as a result, Ava could not contribute much manpower to Pegu's war effort in Siam. (Note: See (Maha Yazawin Vol. 3 2006: 84–86) for the orders of battle for the 1586, and 1586–87 invasions of Siam, which included no Ava-based commanders.)

=== Reign ===
Minye Kyawswa's term proved tumultuous from the outset. The repeated failures in Siam were seriously eroding the power of the high king at Pegu. No vassal ruler was impressed by the 19-year-old viceroy. Just seven months into his term, in September 1587, a small Shan state of Inya revolted. The new administration at Ava was helpless, unable to organize a military force. Finally, his father had to send 4000 troops from Lower Burma, which took seven months to put down the rebellion.

Ava did get a better handle of the situation in the following years. In 1590, Minye Kyawswa was able to contribute the vast majority of the 10,000-strong army, raised to suppress a rebellion in the northern Shan state of Mogaung. But he still did not take part in the campaign. His younger brother Thado Dhamma Yaza, Viceroy of Prome, came up to take command of the army. (A 12-year-old Prince Natshinnaung also came to "command" a regiment.) The army went on to put down the rebellion by March 1591 but instabilities returned soon after the army left. This time, however, Minye Kyawswa needed to go to the front himself. He was explicitly asked to do so by Nanda, who was frantically directing all his efforts to defeat a Siamese invasion of the southern Tenasserim coast. In October 1591, Minye Kyawswa for the first time went to the front, leading an army of 8000 men, 600 horses and 60 elephants. After seven months of siege, the army broke through and took the city. The rebel chief of Mogaung was caught and executed.

The success at Mogaung won plaudits of the king. It was the only bright spot for Nanda. Not only had all four invasions of Siam gone badly, but Siam was now on counterattack, threatening the Tenasserim coast. In May 1592, Minye Kyawswa went to Pegu, and was showered with lavish presents by his father. It was probably the last time he saw his elder brother Mingyi Swa, who along with his father was planning another invasion of Siam. Perhaps because Upper Burma was still unstable, Minye Kyawswa did not contribute much manpower to the invasion effort. (Note: See (Maha Yazawin Vol. 3 2006: 93) for the order of battle for the fifth invasion.)

Minye Kyawswa soon became the front runner to succeed Mingyi Swa, who fell in action in Siam in January 1593. But Nanda was greatly shocked and saddened by his eldest son's death, and waited nearly a year to before appointing his second son heir apparent on 29 December [O.S. 19 December] 1593. Distrustful of potential rivals in Upper Burma, the king did not however appoint another viceroy or even a governor at Ava. He made Minye Kyawswa's deputies Baya Yawda and Let-Yway Myin Hmu as co-administrators, backed by a 3000-strong army.

== Heir apparent ==
In January 1594, Minye Kyawswa returned to a greatly weakened Pegu. Its home base of Lower Burma had borne the brunt of the war effort in the past decade, and was now greatly depopulated. Able men had fled military service to become monks, indentured servants, private retainers or refugees in the nearby kingdoms. Yet, the new crown prince frantically set out to raise more men—again mainly from Lower Burma, branding men to facilitate identification, executing deserters, and forcing monks into the army. He soon clashed with Thado Dhamma Yaza, who openly disagreed with his tactics. Nanda was forced to intervene the quarrel between the brothers, officially releasing the conscripted men and seized property. But the damage was already done. Coercion proved self-defeating. With cultivators disappearing, rice prices in Lower Burma reached unheard of levels.

What followed was a series of revolts throughout the empire in the next three years. The great unraveling was initiated by a Siamese-backed rebellion in Moulmein (Mawlamyaing) in October/November 1594. Siamese forces led by King Naresuan proceeded to lay siege to Pegu in December. Towards the end of the siege, in April 1595, Prome revolted. It was followed by Lan Xang c. November 1595. (Note: (Simms & Simms 2001: 89–90) says Nokeo Koumane revolted in 1593 but (Fernquest 2005: 47) says the earliest evidence of a Lan Xang revolt against Nanda in the Lan Xang, Chiang Mai, Ayutthaya and Burmese chronicles is 957 ME (10 April 1595 to 8 April 1596). Nokeo had already revolted by November 1595. According to the Nan Chronicle (Ratchasomphan 1994: 67), Lan Xang and Nan forces fought a battle with Lan Na forces on 25 November 1595 NS.) Upper Burma and other northern territories had been de facto independent, certainly since Minye Kyawswa was recalled to Pegu, if not earlier. (Note: (Kyaw Win on Toungoo Administration in Yazawin Thit Vol. 2 2012: lxxx): A 1593 royal inscription still claims all northern territories including Manipur, Chinese Shan states and Kengtung as tributaries. But by then, the authority of Pegu was at best nominal as evidenced by the collapse of the empire soon after.) Lan Xang briefly returned to the fold in 1596 with the sudden death of the rebel king Nokeo Koumane. But by April 1597, Toungoo and Lan Na had openly revolted. Others like Ava and Lan Xang did not declare outright independence but effectively broke away as well.

Pegu was powerless to do anything. By then, Nanda and Minye Kyawswa were just hanging onto two provinces (Pegu and the Irrawaddy delta) of Lower Burma. In 1598, the rebel state of Toungoo and the western coast kingdom of Arakan agreed to a joint attack on Pegu. Toungoo and Arakanese forces laid siege to Pegu in April 1599. Eight months into the siege, the city was starving, and much of the garrison had already deserted. Minye Kyawswa then got a secret offer from King Minye Thihathu II of Toungoo who promised to give him his daughter in marriage if he defected. Minye Kyawswa accepted the offer, and fled the city; Minye Thihathu then sent Minye Kyawswa to Toungoo (Taungoo) along with 30 servants.

Minye Kyawswa's defection greatly shocked Nanda. The king reportedly said that he was fighting only for his son, who had now betrayed him. A dejected king at once surrendered on 19 December [O.S. 9 December] 1599.

== Death ==
Meanwhile, at Toungoo (Taungoo), the heir-apparent of Toungoo Natshinnaung, who had intensely disliked Nanda and Minye Kyawswa, ignored his father's promise, and ordered the execution of Minye Kyawswa. The fallen crown prince was 32.

== Bibliography ==
- Aung-Thwin, Michael A.; Maitrii Aung-Thwin (2012). A History of Myanmar Since Ancient Times (illustrated ed.). Honolulu: University of Hawai'i Press. ISBN 978-1-86189-901-9.
- Fernquest, Jon (Spring 2005). "The Flight of Lao War Captives from Burma back to Laos in 1596: A Comparison of Historical Sources" (PDF). SOAS Bulletin of Burma Research. 3 (1). ISSN 1479-8484. Archived from the original (PDF) on 2022-01-18.
- Harvey, G. E. (1925). History of Burma: From the Earliest Times to 10 March 1824. London: Frank Cass & Co. Ltd.
- Kala, U (1724). Maha Yazawin (in Burmese). Vol. 1–3 (2006, 4th printing ed.). Yangon: Ya-Pyei Publishing.
- Lieberman, Victor B. (2003). Strange Parallels: Southeast Asia in Global Context, c. 800–1830, volume 1, Integration on the Mainland. Cambridge University Press. ISBN 978-0-521-80496-7.
- Maha Sithu (2012) [1798]. Kyaw Win; Thein Hlaing (eds.). Yazawin Thit (in Burmese). Vol. 1–3 (2nd ed.). Yangon: Ya-Pyei Publishing.
- Ratchasomphan (Sænluang.) (1994). David K. Wyatt (ed.). The Nan Chronicle. SEAP Publications. ISBN 9780877277156.
- Royal Historians of Burma (c. 1680). U Hla Tin (Hla Thamein) (ed.). Zatadawbon Yazawin (1960 ed.). Historical Research Directorate of the Union of Burma.
- Royal Historical Commission of Burma (1832). Hmannan Yazawin (in Burmese). Vol. 1–3 (2003 ed.). Yangon: Ministry of Information, Myanmar.
- Simms, Peter; Sanda Simms (2001). The Kingdoms of Laos: Six Hundred Years of History (illustrated ed.). Psychology Press. ISBN 9780700715312.
- Stuart-Fox, Martin (2008). Historical Dictionary of Laos. Scarecrow Press. ISBN 9780810864115.
- Than Tun (1985). The Royal Orders of Burma, A.D. 1598–1885. Vol. 2. Kyoto University. hdl:2433/173789.

Minye Kyawswa II of Ava Toungoo Dynasty Born: c. 16 November 1567 Died: late December 1599
Royal titles
Preceded by Mingyi Swa	Heir Apparent of Burma; 29 December 1593 – 18 December 1599	Succeeded by Anaukpetlun
Preceded by Min Letya as Governor	Viceroy of Ava; 5 February 1587 – 29 December 1593	Succeeded by Baya Yawda and Let-Yway-Gyi Myin Hmu as Co-Administrators
