= Pye Min =

Pye Min ပြည်မင်း
- King of Toungoo, Prince of Prome, Prome King

King of Burma
- Reign: 3 June 1661 – 14 April 1672
- Coronation: 7 September 1661; Wednesday, Full moon of Tawthalin 1023 ME
- Predecessor: Pindale
- Successor: Narawara
- Born: 26 May 1619; Sunday, 14th waxing of Nayon 981 ME
- Died: 14 April 1672 (aged 52); Thursday, 2nd waning of Tagu 1034 ME; Ava (Inwa)
- Burial: 15 April 1672; Inwa Palace
- Consort: Khin Ma Latt
- Issue: 6 sons and 8 daughters including: Narawara
Names
- Maha Pawara Dhamma Yaza Lawka Dipadi မဟာ ပဝရ ဓမ္မ ရာဇ လောက ဓိပတိ
- House: Toungoo
- Father: Thalun
- Mother: Khin Myat Hset of Pinya
- Religion: Theravada Buddhism

Pye Min (Burmese: ပြည်မင်း, pronounced [pjé mɪ́ɰ̃]; 26 May 1619 – 14 April 1672) was king of Toungoo dynasty from 1661 to 1672. Pye Min was a son of King Thalun. During the reign of his brother Pindale, the Prince of Pyay (Prome) led the Burmese resistance against Southern Ming and Qing incursions.

King Pindale, however, lost his popularity and Pye was urged to take the throne. Pye staged a coup in 1661, overthrowing Pindale and crowning himself King of Ava.

Pye was determined to reduce the power of Yongli Emperor of Southern Ming at Sagaing and held a conference of Chinese officials. Yongli suspected this as an assassination trick and instead ordered his armies to clash with the Burmese. However, the Chinese were largely decimated. In 1662, the Qing armies invaded Burma and Pye Min decided to leave the last Ming Emperor to the Qing. Yongli Emperor was carried out of Burma.

There was a Mon rebellion around Martaban in 1661 and in 1662 Lan Na was invaded by the Siamese armies under King Narai who held the city temporarily. The rest of his reign were largely uneventful and Pye Min died in 1672, succeeded by his son Narawara.

== Early life ==
The future king was born to King Thalun and a minor queen Khin Myat Hset of Pinya on 26 May 1619. The young prince received the title of Minye Kyawkhaung. He was appointed governor of Prome (Pyay or Pye) on 13 September 1650 (Tuesday, 4th waning of Tawthalin 1012 ME) by King Pindale.

== Bibliography ==
- Kala, U (1724). Maha Yazawin (in Burmese). Vol. 1–3 (2006, 4th printing ed.). Yangon: Ya-Pyei Publishing.
- Royal Historical Commission of Burma (1829–1832). Hmannan Yazawin (in Burmese). Vol. 1–3 (2003 ed.). Yangon: Ministry of Information, Myanmar.

Pye Min Toungoo Dynasty Born: 26 May 1619 Died: 14 April 1672
Regnal titles
Preceded by Pindale	King of Burma; 3 June 1661 – 14 April 1672	Succeeded by Narawara
Preceded by Udein Kyawhtin as Governor of Prome	Viceroy of Prome; 13 September 1650 – 3 June 1661	Succeeded by Minye Zeya Thura as Mayor of Prome
