= Minyedeippa =

Minyedeippa မင်းရဲဒိဗ္ဗ
- King of Toungoo

King of Burma
- Reign: 9 July 1628 – 19 August 1630
- Predecessor: Anaukpetlun
- Successor: Thalun
- Born: 1608; Pegu (Bago)
- Died: 25 November 1630 (aged 22); Sunday, 11th waxing of Natdaw 991 ME; Pegu (Bago)
- Consort: နှင့်ခမ်းပေါ Ning (Nang) Hkam Pao the daughter of Chao Kiang Hkam, the Sawbwa of Kengtung
- House: Toungoo
- Father: Anaukpetlun
- Mother: Khin Myo Myat
- Religion: Theravada Buddhism

Minyedeippa (Burmese: မင်းရဲဒိဗ္ဗ, pronounced [mɪ́ɰ̃jɛ́ deiʔpa̰]; also spelled Minredeippa or Minyedaikpa; 1608 – 25 November 1630) was the seventh king of Toungoo dynasty of Burma. He came to throne in July 1628 after having assassinated his father King Anaukpetlun who had discovered Minyedeippa's affair with one of his minor queen, daughter of Kengtung Sawbwa. Anaukpetlun had severely scolded the young prince that what he had done was high treason and that merited being roasted alive.

After the assassination, Minyedaikpa was able to strong-arm the ministers at the court to proclaim him king as the main two contenders to the throne, his two uncles Thalun and Minye Kyawswa were away at the Shan States on a military campaign. Although nominally king, Minyedeippa never had any control beyond Pegu, the kingdom's capital. Throughout 1628, his two uncles Thalun and Minye Kyawswa marched back from Shan States and controlled Upper Burma while many others at Lower Burma revolted his rule. In 1630, Thalun marched down from Ava to reconquer Lower Burma. The king of Arakan sent an army to assist Minyedaikpa but to no avail. In August 1630, the parricide king was seized by the Commander of Palace Guards, and sent to Thalun. Thalun denied Minyedeippa's request to become a monk, and executed him in November of that year., but in the origin chronicle he was rescued by a Burmese royal family from Chiang Mai. and he was safe until the king left the city for him to stay with an old authorities the Bayinnaung's principal queen's lineage and moved away.

== Notes ==
Minyedeippa Toungoo Dynasty Born: 1608 Died: 25 November 1629
Regnal titles
Preceded by Anaukpetlun	King of Burma; 9 July 1628 – 19 August 1629	Succeeded by Thalun
