= Smim Htaw Buddhaketi =

Smim Htaw Buddhaketi သမိန်ထောဗုဒ္ဓကိတ္တိ

King of Restored Hanthawaddy
- Reign: 8 December 1740 – January 1747
- Successor: Binnya Dala
- Prime Minister: Binnya Dala
- Born: Pagan?
- Died: Chiang Mai?
- Consort: Thiri Seitta of Chiang Mai
Names
- Tha Hla သာလှ
- House: Toungoo
- Father: Lord of Pagan
- Mother: Thupappa
- Religion: Theravada Buddhism

Smim Htaw Buddhaketi (Burmese: သမိန်ထောဗုဒ္ဓကိတ္တိ [θəmèɪɰ̃ tʰɔ́ boʊʔda̰ keɪʔtḭ]) was the first king of the Restored Kingdom of Hanthawaddy which overthrew Toungoo Dynasty's rule in Lower Burma. From 1740 to 1747, the ethnic Burman king was a nominal figurehead of the ethnic Mon rebellion. He was selected to be king by the leaders of the Mon insurrection for his royal lineage.

Styled with the Mon title Smim Htaw Buddhaketi (lit. 'Lord of the Striped Elephant'; "ဆင်ကျားရှင်") the former Buddhist monk found it difficult to adjust himself to the life of king. As an ethnic Burman, he was reluctant to take charge of the government or command of the army, and usually absent from the capital. Much of the governance and fighting was left to his prime minister Binnya Dala, a local Mon nobleman. Forced to abdicate, he left for Chiang Mai, but was later imprisoned by Borommakot and sent to China, where he made his way back to Chiang Mai.

== Background ==
He was reputedly a son of lord of Pagan who fled to east of Pegu after his unsuccessful revolt against King Taninganway in 1714. This would make the Burmese king Mahadhammaraza Dipadi a nephew of his. Smim Htaw Buddhaketi grew up among Shans and Karens of the region, and spoke Mon.

== Accession and abdication ==
He was put on the throne on 8 December [O.S. 27 November] 1740. (Note: Zatadawbon Yazawin (Zata 1960: 44) says he came to power in Nadaw 1102 ME (19 November 1740 to 17 December 1740 NS). Per (Lieberman 1984: 215–216), his forces attacked Syriam on 15 December [O.S. 4 December] 1740, a week after his accession; it means he came to power on 8 December [O.S. 27 November] 1740.)

He was forced to abdicate his throne in January 1747.

== Bibliography ==
- Harvey, G. E. (1925). History of Burma: From the Earliest Times to 10 March 1824. London: Frank Cass & Co. Ltd.
- Htin Aung, Maung (1967). A History of Burma. New York and London: Cambridge University Press.
- Myint-U, Thant (2006). The River of Lost Footsteps-Histories of Burna. New York: Farrar, Straus and Giroux. ISBN 978-0-374-16342-6.
- Lieberman, Victor B. (1984). Burmese Administrative Cycles: Anarchy and Conquest, c. 1580–1760. Princeton University Press. ISBN 0-691-05407-X.
- Royal Historians of Burma (c. 1680). U Hla Tin (Hla Thamein) (ed.). Zatadawbon Yazawin (1960 ed.). Historical Research Directorate of the Union of Burma.
- Royal Historical Commission of Burma (1832). Hmannan Yazawin (in Burmese). Vol. 1–3 (2003 ed.). Yangon: Ministry of Information, Myanmar.

Smim Htaw Buddhaketi Restored Hanthawaddy
Regnal titles
New title	King of Hanthawaddy; 8 December 1740 – January 1747	Succeeded by Binnya Dala
