= Chiang Saen Principality =

Vassal state of the Nyaungyan dynasty and Konbaung dynasty,

Chiang Saen Principality: นครรัฐเชียงแสน (Thai); 景線 (Chinese)
- 1614–1804
- Status: Tributary of Toungoo (1614–1628, 1632–1662, 1672–1752); Part of Chiang Mai (1628–1632); De facto independent (1662–1672, 1752–1757); Tributary of Konbaung (1757–1804); Tusi of Qing (1766–1767)
- Capital: Chiang Saen
- Official languages: Northern Thai; Burmese
- Spoken languages: Northern Thai, Burmese
- Religion: Theravada Buddhism
- Government: Mandala kingdom
- Saopha
- Historical era: Post-classical era, early modern era
  - Anaukpetlun appointed Kaphueak: 1614
  - Thipphanet rule Lanna: 1632
  - Sanay Min divided Chiang Saen from Chiang Mai: 1704
  - Burmese–Siamese War (1802–1805) (Chiang Saen got destroyed): 1804
Preceded by	Succeeded by
Lan Na	Kingdom of Chiang Mai; Nan Principality
- Today part of: Thailand; Laos

The Chiang Saen Principality (Thai: นครรัฐเชียงแสน; Chinese: 景線) was a vassal state of the Nyaungyan dynasty and Konbaung dynasty, which divided from Lanna to serve as the administrative center of the upper Lanna region. Later got annexed into Siam's vassal state: Kingdom of Chiang Mai and Nan Principality.

== History ==
Chiang Saen got divided from Lanna after Anaukpetlun captured Chiang Mai in 1614-1615. Phaya Chaban, ruler of Chiang Saen, gives elephants and pledges allegiance to him. Thus, Anaukpetlun appointed him as Chaopha Kaphueak, and Chiang Saen came under direct control from the Bago royal court. Chiang Saen came back to be part of Chiang Mai after Pholsuek Say Chaiyasongkhram proclaimed its independence from Burmese rule and captured Thipphanet. In 1632 Thalun suppressed Chiang Mai and restored Thipphanet as ruler of Chiang Saen and gave him authority to govern all Lanna cities except Chiang Mai.

The conflict between Burma, the Southern Ming and the Qing dynasty makes Chiang Saen, under the rule of Saenmueang, get invaded by the Ayutthaya Kingdom and the Haw in the Burmese–Siamese War. The people of Chiang Saen had to abandon the city and break from Ava before the Burmese's control came back in 1673. Minye Kyawhtin sent a Bohmu, Fa Sang Kung, to govern the city. Fa Sang Kung then appointed Myowun. This marked the beginning of the governance of Chiang Saen by the Myowun alongside the Chaopha. In 1704, the Myowun of Chiang Saen got captured and executed by the order of the ruler of Chiang Mai. In the same year, Sanay Min came to reside in Chiang Saen and placed Chiang Saen under the direct control of Ava, on par with Chiang Mai again.

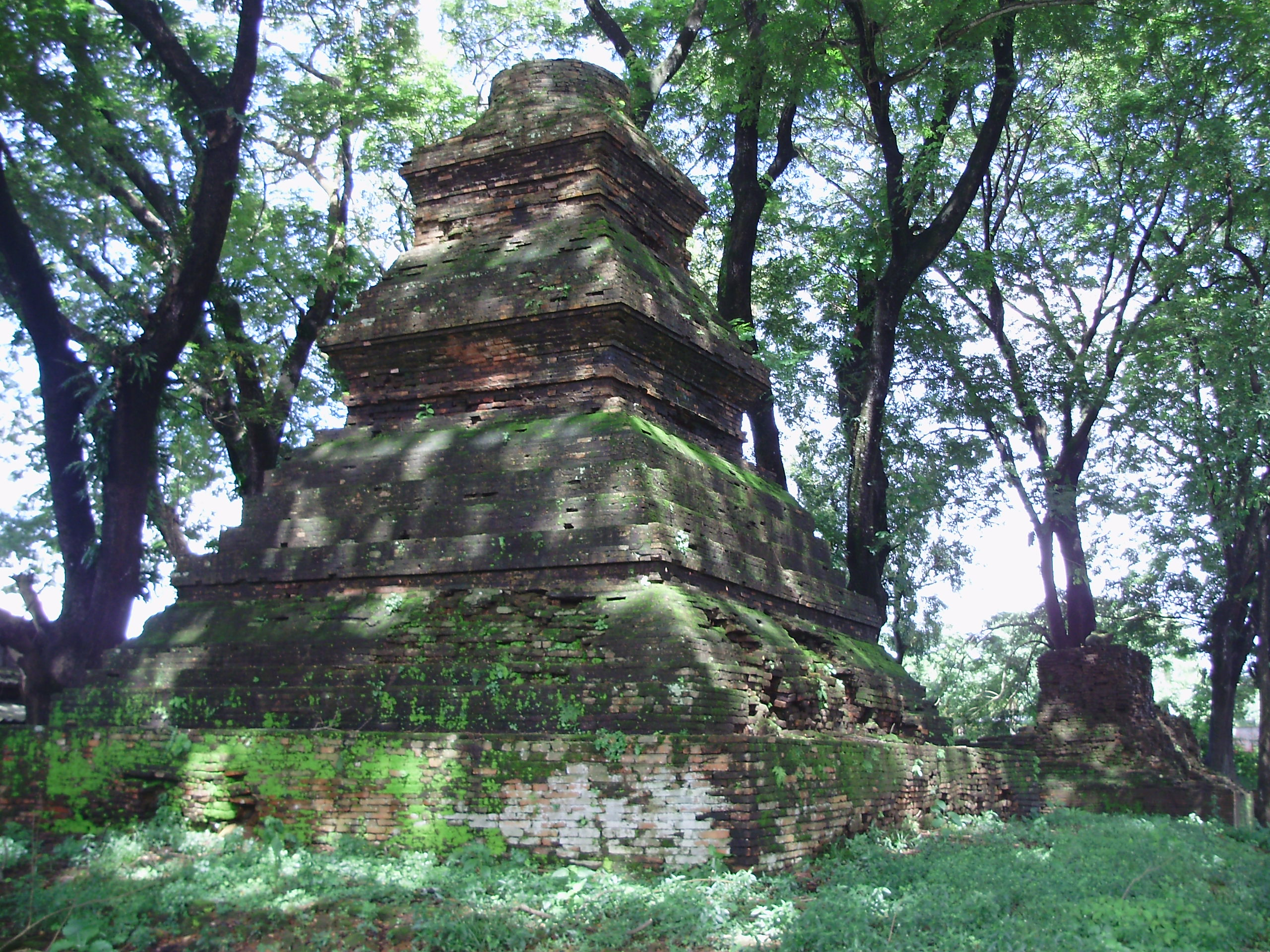
Wat Chetawan, Chiang Saen district, Chiang Rai province, built in the reign of Thippanet at the order of Thalun.

In 1727, Thepsingh rebelled against Burma and captured Chiang Mai, leading to political instability in the Lanna region. Chiang Saen became the political center of Burma in the region and a target for attacks from other cities that opposed Burma. In 1752, the Toungoo dynasty collapsed, and Chiang Saen got brief independence and got invaded from Chiang Mai, Luang Phrabang and Lamphun until it became Burma's vassal again when the Konbaung dynasty consolidated power in 1752. The new dynasty's expansion made Shan rulers ask for help from the Qing dynasty, which led to the Sino-Burmese War. The Chinese army successfully captured Chiang Khaeng and Kengtung State in 1766. Na Sai, the ruler of Chiang Saen, pledged allegiance to the Qing and got appointed as Tusi. However, Chiang Saen came back under the Burmese rule in the next year.

Siamese conquest of Lan Na ended Burmese influence in lower Lanna. Chiang Saen became the sole administrative center and base of Burma in its wars against Siam until it was conquered by the combined forces of Siam, Chiang Mai, Lampang, Nan and Vientiane in the Burmese–Siamese War, the city of Chiang Saen got destroyed, and its administrative towns were annexed to Chiang Mai and Nan. Na Khaw, the last ruler of Chiang Saen, got captured.

== List of rulers of Chiang Saen ==
Name	Reign from	Reign until	Notes
Kaphueak (male)	1614	1619	Previously a governor of Chiang Saen
Kaphueak (female)	1619	1628	A wife of previous ruler
Thipphanet	1628	1628	(1st regin) Previously a noble of Chiang Saen
Pholsuek Say Chaiyasongkhram declared independence from Burma. Thipphanet got captured to Chiang Mai. Chiang Sean under Chiang Mai's control, 1628
Sri Songmueang Wichaiprakarn	1628	1632	Previously a governor of Lampang
Thalun captured Chiang Mai, It became Burma's tributary state again. 1632
Thipphanet	1632	1650	(2nd reign)
Muakkham	1650	1655	A son of Thipphanet
Saenmueang	1655	1662	A son of Muakkham
Saenmueang break his service to Ava. Chiang Saen became de facto independence, 1662
Saenmueang	1662	1672	
Minye Kyawhtin sent a general to control Chaing Saen. It became Burmese's tributary state again, 1672
Inmueang	1672	1678	A son of Saenmueang
Chalermmueang	1678	1692	A son of Inmueang
Mueangluang	1692	1935	Got appointed by a Bohmu, Fa Sang Kung
Nohmuang	1935	1700	A son of Chalermmueang
Lomsane	1700	1711	A younger brother of Nohmueang
Lakthi	1711	9 September 1724	A son of Lomsane
Yotngammueang	1724	1728	A son of Lakthi
Harn	1728	16 April 1741	Come from Mueang Pong
Ngarm	1741	1752	A son of Yotngammueang
Toungoo dynasty collapsed. Chiang Saen became independent, 1752
Ngarm	1752	1757	
Konbaung dynasty can consolidate power. Chiang Saen came back under Burma's control, 1757
Ngarm	1757	7 January 1761	
Vacant, 1761
Khampio	1761	1766	A son of Harn
Vacant, 1766–1767
Na Sai acting governor of Chiang Saen pledged allegiance to the Qing dynasty between Sino-Burmese War, November 1766
Burmese forces control Chiang Saen. It came back under Burmese's control again, 1767
Na Khwa	1767	17 May 1804	A grandson of Ngarm
Burmese–Siamese War (1802–1805), Chiang Saen got destroyed, 1804

== See also ==
- Burmese–Siamese War (1802–1805)
- Chiang Saen district
