= Burmese–Siamese War (1802–1805) =

Military conflict

- Part of the Burmese–Siamese wars
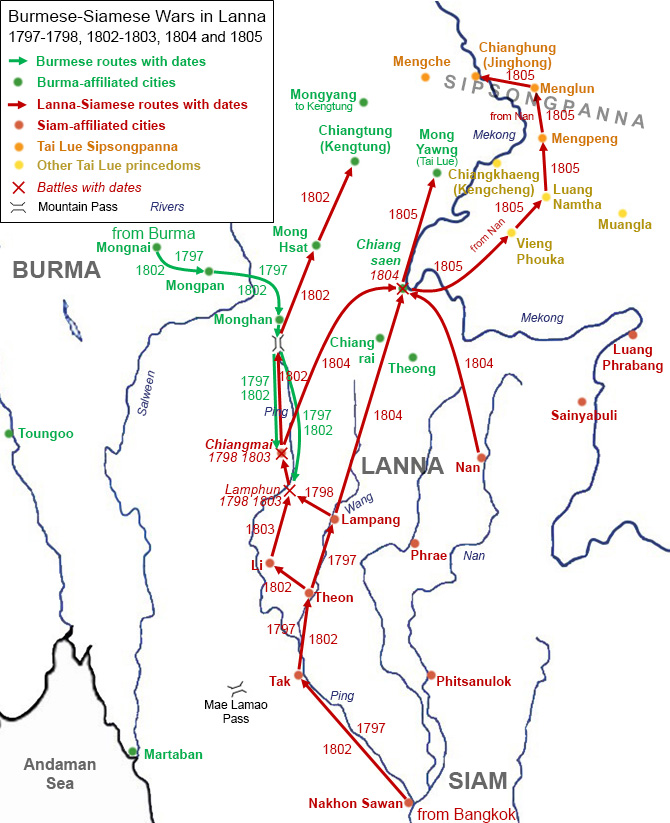
- Burmese–Siamese Wars in Lanna in 1797–1798, 1802–1803 and 1804; Siamese invasions of Chiang Tung (1802) and Chiang Hung (1805); Green depicts the Burmese. Red depicts the Siamese.
Date	1802–1803, 1804 and 1805
Location	Northern Thailand, Kengtung, Sipsongpanna
Result	Siamese victory; forced relocation of Tai Khuen and Tai Lue people to Siam
Territorial changes	Siam gained control of Chiang Saen

Belligerents
Konbaung dynasty (Burma); Chiang Saen Principality (tributary to Burma)	Rattanakosin Kingdom (Siam); Chiang Mai (tributary to Siam); Kingdom of Vientiane (tributary to Siam)

Commanders and leaders
Bodawpaya; Einshe Wun Nemyo Kyawdin Thihathu; Thado Mindin †; Na Khwa (POW)	Rama I Prince Maha Sura Singhanat; Prince Anurak Devesh; Prince Thepharirak; Anouvong; Kawila; Thammalangka

The Burmese–Siamese War (1802–1805) was the military conflict between the Kingdom of Burma under the Konbaung dynasty and the Kingdom of Siam under the Chakri dynasty over the Lan Na city-states (modern Northern Thailand). It is composed of two parts: the Burmese Invasion of Chiang Mai in 1802 and the Siamese Invasion of Chiang Saen in 1804.

The Burmese King Bodawpaya attempted to reclaim the lost dominions in Lan Na, east of Salween River. Lan Na, under the leadership of Prince Kawila of Chiang Mai with Siamese support, successfully repelled the Burmese invasion. The Siamese under King Rama I then dispatched troops, in retaliation, to attack Burmese Chiang Saen in 1805. The town of Chiang Saen surrendered and came under Siamese rule.

== Background ==
=== Lanna under Burmese rule ===
After the capture of Chiang Mai by King Bayinnaung of the Burmese Toungoo dynasty in 1558, the whole Lan Na Kingdom (modern Northern Thailand) came under the Burmese rule for about 200 years. In 1628, King Anaukpetlun of Burmese Toungoo dynasty was assassinated by his own son, Minyedeippa. In 1630, Saen Luang Rueadon (แสนหลวงเรือดอน), a Lanna nobleman from Chiang Saen, successfully supported Anaukpetlun's brother, Thalun, to take the throne from his nephew. Thalun appointed Saen Luang Rueadon to be saopha Luang Thipphanet (เจ้าฟ้าหลวงทิพเนตร) of Chiang Saen. Descendants of Luang Thipphanet would mostly rule the Chiang Saen state until 1804.

Chiang Saen state gained more influence during Burmese rule in Lanna as Chiang Saen was a loyal Burmese ally than the rebellious Chiang Mai. In 1701, Burma separated Chiang Saen from Chiang Mai and the whole eastern half of Lanna, including Chiang Rai, Nan and Mong Yawng, were given under jurisdiction of Chiang Saen. Chiang Saen rulers were accompanied by Burma-appointed Myowuns or governors. With the decline of Toungoo dynasty, Chiang Mai and most of Lanna were able to break free in 1727, while Chiang Saen remained loyal to Burma. Lanna was independent for about three decades until it was reconquered by the new Burmese Konbaung dynasty in 1763.

=== Transfer of Lanna from Burma to Siam ===
In 1774, the native Tai Yuan chiefs Phraya Chaban Boonma and Phraya Kawila conflicted with Thado Mindin, the Burmese governor of Chiang Mai, and decided to join Siam, leading to the successful Siamese capture of Chiang Mai by Chao Phraya Chakri (King Rama I). Then, most of the Lan Na city-states, including Chiang Mai, Lampang and Nan, came under Siamese rule. Saopha of Chiang Saen, however, remained loyal to Burma. Northern towns of Chiang Saen and Chiang Rai, however, remained under Burmese rule. King Taksin of Thonburi appointed Phraya Chaban as Phraya Wichenprakarn the ruler of Chiang Mai and Phraya Kawila as the ruler of Lampang. Thado Mindin moved to become the governor of Chiang Saen.

King Singu Min sent Burmese forces to invade Chiang Mai in 1776. Phraya Wichenprakarn of Chiang Mai, with fewer manpower, decided to abandon the city during the Burmese invasion and, together with the whole inhabitants of the city, retreated and took refuge down south in Sawankhalok. The town of Lampang, ruled by Prince Kawila, became the first-line defense against the Burmese incursions.

Chiang Saen became the base for Burmese operations to reclaim the lost dominions in Lan Na. During the Nine Armies' War in 1785, Prince Thado Thiri Maha Uzana and Abaya-Kamani, the governor of Chiang Saen, led the army of 30,000 men to lay siege to Lampang. Prince Kawila held the town for four months until the Siamese relief forces arrived from the south and expelled the Burmese in 1786. Thado Mindin invaded Lampang again in 1787. Prince Maha Sura Singhanat, younger brother of King Rama I, personally led the Siamese army to help Prince Kawila repel the Burmese. Abaya-Kamani was captured and sent to Bangkok. King Rama I restored the city of Chiang Mai as the forefront citadel against the Burmese invasion and made Prince Kawila the ruler of Chiang Mai in 1787. Thado Mindin later returned to resume the governorship of Chiang Saen.

=== Capture of Kengtung and Mong Hsat (1802) ===
Prince Kawila and other Lan Na lords adopted the policy of "picking vegetables in baskets, putting people in towns" and waged wars to seek manpower. In 1802, King Bodawpaya appointed a Chinese man from Yunnan Province named Chom Hong as the ruler of Mong Hsat, one of the Shan States. Bodawpaya also declared that Chom Hong of Mong Hsat would rule all the "fifty-two towns of Lan Na". Prince Kawila then sent his younger brother and heir Phraya Uparaj Thammalangka to seize Mong Hsat. Mong Hsat was taken and Chom Hong was captured to Chiang Mai.

From Mong Hsat, Phraya Thammalangka decided to proceed his campaign to Chiangtung (Kengtung), which had been under Burmese domination. Chiangtung was the former territory of the Lan Na kingdom during the Mangrai dynasty in the 13th century. The inhabitants of Chiangtung were the Khün people. Thammalangka took Chiangtung in March 1802 and captured Sao Kawng Tai, the saopha of Kengtung, to Chiang Mai. Phraya Thammalangka deported around 5,000 Khün people from Mong Hsat and 6,000 of Khün people from Chiangtung to settle in Chiang Mai. Maha Hkanan, brother of Sao Kawng Tai, escaped to Mong Yawng and tried to establish himself as an independent ruler. At Mong Hsat, Prince Kawila also captured the Burmese envoy returning from the mission to Emperor Gia Long. Chiangtung and Mong Hsat then came under Siamese domination. King Bodawpaya then used these provocations by the Lan Na prince as the casus belli to resume his expedition against Chiang Mai.

== Burmese invasion of Chiang Mai (1802) ==
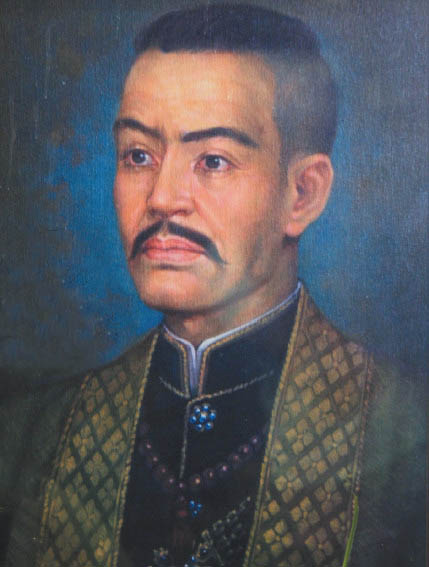
Prince Maha Sura Singhanat of the Front Palace, younger brother of King Rama I, led the Siamese armies to support his brother-in-law Prince Kawila on three occasions in 1787, 1797 and 1802. He died in November 1803.

=== Invasion and siege on Chiang Mai ===
King Bodawpaya sent general Einshe Wun Nemyo Kyawdin Thihathu to invade and laid siege on Chiang Mai and occupy Lamphun again in 1802. The Siamese adopted nearly the same strategies and marching routes as the campaign of 1797–1798. King Rama I sent his younger brother Prince Maha Sura Singhanat, who was accompanied by his friend Prince Sunthonbhubet and his general Phraya Kalahom Ratchasena Thongin, to bring the Front Palace Army to the north. The king also sent his nephew Prince Thepharirak and Phraya Yommaraj Boonma to lead the Royal Army. Prince Anouvong, brother of King Inthavong of Vientiane, also led the Lao army to join the campaign.

When the Siamese arrived at Thoen, however, Prince Maha Sura Singhanat suffered from stones. He 'immersed' himself in the water to relieve. From Thoen, there were two routes to Lamphun; the eastern route through Lampang and the western route through Li. Instead of choosing the eastern route as in the campaign of 1797, the prince chose the western route from Thoen to Chiang Mai through Li. Maha Sura Singhanat assigned Prince Sunthonbhubet and Phraya Kalahom Ratchasena Thongin to go on to march the Front Palace Army to Li. Prince Thepharirak and Phraya Yommaraj Boonma also followed to Li. However, the army of Prince Thepharirak was delayed and fell back behind the Front Palace Army.

Prince Kawila of Chiang Mai defended the city against Nemyo Kyawdin Thihathu the Burmese commander. Upon learning that the southern Siamese had reached Thoen, Prince Kawila sent a man named Mahayak to go through Burmese blockade to visit Prince Maha Sura Singhanat at Thoen. Prince Maha Sura Singhanat conveyed the message through Mahayak to Prince Kawila that he had already sent Siamese relief forces to Chiang Mai. The Siamese attacked the Burmese at Lamphun and the Burmese were routed.

=== Chiang Mai's retreat ===
King Rama I at Bangkok learnt that his younger brother was ill and stayed at Thoen. He sent his another nephew Prince Anurak Devesh for substitution. Prince Anurak Devesh visited his uncle at Thoen. Prince Maha Sura Singhanat gave his nephew the authorities to command the Front Palace Army and ordered him to go to Chiang Mai. Meanwhile, Prince Sunthonbhubet and Prince Thepharirak, after the victory at Lamphun, attacked the Burmese at Chiang Mai. Prince Anurak Devesh arrived in Chiang Mai and ordered the Siamese armies to attack the Burmese in all directions. Nemyo Kyawdin Thihathu was defeated at Chiang Mai for the second time and the Burmese retreated northwards.

After the Siamese victory at Chiang Mai, all of the princes came down to visit Prince Maha Sura Singhanat at Thoen. Prince Anouvong of Vientiane and his Lao army, however, only arrived seven days after the Battle of Chiang Mai. Prince Maha Sura Singhanat angered at the delay of the armies of Prince Thepharirak and Prince Anouvong. He then ordered Prince Thepharirak, Prince Kawila, Prince Anouvong and Phraya Yommaraj Boonma to attack and take Chiang Saen. Prince Maha Sura Singhanat and Prince Anurak Devesh then returned to Bangkok.

=== Interbellum ===
In 1803, Prince Kawila of Chiang Mai was crowned as "King of Chiang Mai" as a tributary ruler by the orders of King Rama I for his contributions to the defense of Lan Na on many occasions. Upon his return to Bangkok, the illness of Prince Maha Sura Singhanat subsided. However, he was ill again in July 1803. Prince Maha Sura Singhanat died in November 1803. Three months later, however, his two eldest sons, Prince Lamduan and Prince Inthapat, were found training armies for rebellion. Phraya Kalahom Ratchasena Thongin was also implicated. They were executed for treason in February 1804.

== Siamese invasion of Chiang Saen (1804) ==
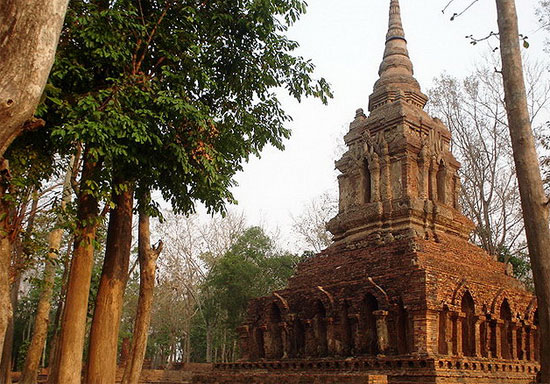
Wat Pasak in Chiang Saen—one of the few structures that survived the destruction of Chiang Saen in April 1804.

Prince Thepharirak and Yommaraj Boonma, who were assigned to take Chiang Saen, stayed at Chiang Mai to assemble armies and wait for the dry season. The armies were drafted from the northern towns of Chiang Mai, Lampang, and Nan. King Kawila assigned his younger brother and heir Phraya Uparaj Thammalangka to lead the Lan Na army to subjugate Chiang Saen. The Lao army of Prince Anouvong also joined the campaign. The armies consisted of five regiments:

- The Siamese regiment under Prince Thepharirak and Phraya Yommaraj Boonma.
- The Lan Na regiment under Phraya Uparaj Thammalangka of Chiang Mai with 1,000 men.
- The Lao regiment under Prince Anouvong of Vientiane.
- The regiment under Prince Kamsom of Lampang (younger brother of King Kawila) with 1,000 men.
- The regiment under Prince Atthawarapanyo of Nan with 1,000 men.

All five regiments set off from Chiang Mai, Lampang and Nan northwards to attack Chiang Saen in April 1804. Nakhwa, the saopha of Chiang Saen and descendant of Luang Thipphanet, was the last of his lineage that had been ruling Chiang Saen under Burmese domination since 1630. Thado Mindin, the former governor of Chiang Saen, led the Burmese defenses. After besieging Chiang Saen for about one month, the combined Siamese-Lan Na-Lao forces were unable to take the city. As he ran out of food resources, Prince Thepharirak decided to retreat, leaving only Lan Na and Lao armies at Chiang Saen. However, the inhabitants of Chiang Saen also suffered from starvation and rebelled against Burmese authorities. Phraya Thammalangka and his allies was then able to take Chiang Saen. Thado Mindin was shot to death in the battle. Nakhwa and the Burmese retreated north beyond the Mekong River Thammalangka pursued and captured Nakhwa. Nakhwa of Chiang Saen and Sao Kawng Tai of Kengtung were sent to Bangkok to King Rama I. Nakhwa later died of illness at Bangkok.

Chiang Saen was plundered and destroyed. The victors captured the total 23,000 inhabitants of Chiang Saen and divided them into five equal portions. Each portion was deported to settle in Chiang Mai, Lampang, Nan, Vientiene and Siam. Prince Thepharirak and Yommaraj Boonma led the Siamese war spoils into Siamese central plains and had them settled in Saraburi and Ratchaburi. As Prince Thepharirak returned to Bangkok, King Rama I angered and had the prince and Yommaraj Boonma imprisoned for five days until the royal anger subsided. Prince Thepharirak died in March 1805 due to illness.

== Invasion of Sipsongpanna (1805) ==
=== Background ===
Siamese victories over the Burmese in Lan Na in 1802 and 1804 allowed them to expand their influence through the Lan Na princes into the northernmost Tai princedoms. In August 1804, King Rama I ordered all the northern lords including Chiang Mai, Lampang, Phrae, Nan and the Lao kings of Luang Phrabang and Vientiane to march north to subjugate the Shan States, which had been under Burmese suzerainty, east of Salween River. The armies were also drafted from the Northern Siamese towns of Phitsanulok, Sukhothai, Sawankhalok, Phichit and Pichai.

The main objectives of this campaign were the states of Mongyawng and Chiang Hung (modern Jinghong in Xishuangbanna Dai Autonomous Prefecture). Chiang Hung was the center of "Sipsongpanna"—the federation of Tai Lue tribes that roughly corresponds to modern Xishuangbanna Dai Autonomous Prefecture. Sipsongpanna was the former territory of Lan Na Kingdom during the times of the Mangrai dynasty in the fifteenth century. However, since the sixteenth century, Sipsongpanna had been caught between the domination of Burma and China as its ruler sought recognition from both empires.

=== Lan Na conquest ===
King Kawila of Chiang Mai assigned his brother Phraya Thammalangka to lead the Lan Na troops to the north. Prince Thammalangka marched to Mongyawng in March 1805. The saopha of Mongyawng surrendered to the Lan Na troops without fighting and Maha Hkanan of Chiangtung, who had taken refuge there, escaped again to hide in the forests. Phraya Thammalangka moved the 10,000 people from Chiangtung and Mongyawng to settle in Chiang Mai.

Prince Atthawarapanyo of Nan led his army to subjugate the Tai Lue princedoms to the northeast in March 1805. The Nan army attacked the Tai Lue towns of Vieng Phouka and Luang Namtha (in modern Luang Namtha Province) first. The ruler of Vieng Phouka surrendered, but the ruler of Luang Namtha fled to Mengpeng. Atthawarapanyo proceeded from Vieng Phouka to Mengpeng. Phraya Phap, the ruler of Mengpeng, abandoned his town and fled to Menglun. As the Nan army approached Chiang Hung, all the princes of Mengpeng, Menglun and Mengla (all in the Mengla County) of the Sipsongpanna confederacy retreated to the city of Chiang Hung (Jinghong). Chiang Hung peacefully surrendered to the invaders. The ruler of Kengcheng also submitted. Mahanoi, the ruler of Chiang Hung, was underage and was under the regency of his uncle Prince Mahavang. The Chiang Hung court then sent Prince Mahavang as his delegate to Bangkok for submission. Prince Atthawarapanyo of Nan moved about 40,000 to 50,000 Tai Lue people from Sipsongpanna to settle in Nan and his other dominions.

The whole entourage of Tai Lue princes, headed by the ruler of Kengcheng, including Prince Mahavang of Chiang Hung, Phraya Phap of Mengpeng and Phraya Kamlue of Mengla, traveled down south to visit King Rama I at Bangkok in May 1805. King Rama I thought that the Siamese rule over the northernmost Tai states was impractical due to sheer distance and mountainous geographical obstacles, so he allowed all of the Tai Lue princes to return to their territories.

== Aftermath ==
The Burmese Invasion of Chiang Mai in 1802 was the last Burmese incursion into Lan Na or Northern Thailand. Siamese successes in Lan Na enabled Siam to expand influences into the northernmost Tai Kingdoms of Chiangtung and Chiang Hung through military expeditions of the Lan Na princes. Active resettlement campaigns of King Kawila, however, left Chiangtung devastated and depopulated. However, Siam lost these states in the 1810s.

Sao Kawng Tai of Kengtung, who was captured in 1802 and sent to Bangkok in 1804, returned to live at Chiang Mai in exile. His brother Maha Hkanan, however, led the resistance against the Burmese in the jungles of Kengtung. King Bodawpaya sent armies to reclaim Kengtung. After the protracted guerilla warfare, Maha Hkanan decided to accept Burmese suzerainty and was officially appointed the ruler of Kengtung by Bodawpaya in 1813. Kengtung then reverted to Burmese domination.

King Kawila sent Lan Na armies to subjugate Chiang Hung in 1812. However, the Lan Na armies were defeated by joint Burmese-Chinese forces. Siam only attempted to exert authority over Chiangtung and Chiang Hung again some fifty years later in the Siamese Invasions of Chiangtung in 1849 and 1852–1854.
