= Binnya Dala =

Binnya Dala ဗညားဒလ

King of Restored Hanthawaddy
- Reign: January 1747 – 6 May 1757
- Predecessor: Smim Htaw Buddhaketi
- Successor: None
- Born: Chiang Mai
- Died: December 1774
- Aung Hla (အောင်လှ)
- House: Neo-Hanthawaddy
- Religion: Theravada Buddhism

Binnya Dala (Burmese: ဗညားဒလ [bəɲá dəla̰]; also spelled Banya Dala; died December 1774) was the last king of the Restored Hanthawaddy Kingdom, who reigned from 1747 to 1757. He was a key leader in consolidating the Mon-speaking kingdom, which had successfully revolted against the rule of Nyaungyan dynasty (also known as the Restored Toungoo Dynasty) in 1740. Though Smim Htaw Buddhaketi was the king, it was Binnya Dala who was the prime minister that wielded power. After the nominal king abdicated in 1747, Binnya Dala, a local Mon nobleman with a Burman given name of Aung Hla (အောင်လှ [àʊɴ l̥a̰]), was elected king of the Mon-speaking kingdom.

Binnya Dala continued the war against the Nyaungyan dynasty, launching a full-scale invasion of Upper Burma in 1750, and capturing the capital of Ava in April 1752. Binnya Dala mistakenly thought Upper Burma had been won, and withdrew two-thirds of the invasion force back to Pegu, leaving just a third for what he considered a mop-up operation. The remaining Hanthawaddy forces soon faced serious resistance put up by Alaungpaya who had just founded a new dynasty called Konbaung to challenge the invaders. By December 1753, all of Hanthawaddy forces had been driven out of Upper Burma.

Binnya Dala launched another full-scale invasion in March 1754. The invasion went well at first, laying siege to Ava and advancing deep into upcountry but ultimately faltered, driven back with heavy losses. Following the defeat, the leadership of Hanthawaddy escalated its "self-defeating" policies of ethnic polarization in the south. It executed all Avan captives, including the last king of Toungoo, and began requiring all Burmans in the south to wear an earring with a stamp of the Pegu heir-apparent and to cut their hair in Mon fashion as a sign of loyalty.

After the failed invasion, Binnya Dala and Hanthawaddy forces were on the defensive. Alaungpaya captured the Irrawaddy delta in May 1755, the French defended port of Thanlyin in July 1756, and finally the capital Pegu in May 1757. Binnya Dala was captured and imprisoned. He lived under house arrest for over 17 years. In December 1774, King Hsinbyushin, the second son of Alaungpaya, ordered the execution of the captive king after a Mon rebellion in 1773 had tried to restore the captive king.

== Mon revolt ==
=== Background ===
Pegu (Bago) had been in a wretched state of devastation after the relocation of the capital of the Nyaungyan dynasty from Pegu to Ava (Inwa) by Thalun in 1634. It was a pitiful shadow of its once magnificent bustling metropolis. Pegu lost its usefulness as a seaport through silting of the Pegu River. The choice then was between Syriam (Thanlyin) and Ava as the capital. From the economic point of view, Syriam would have been a better choice where trading with the outside world could be effectively maintained. But Thalun chose Ava in favor of tradition and isolation. Since the move of capital from Pegu to Ava, Pegu had become the rallying point for the Mon revival and insurgency. The Burmese governors were readily hated due to heavy corrupted taxation.

=== Revolt ===
In 1740, during the reign of Mahadhammaraza Dipadi of the Nyaungyan dynasty, the Gwe Shan at Okpo together with Mon deportees drove the Burmese from Madaya taking advantage of the chaos created from the incessant ransacking by the Manipur horsemen which the Ava court seemed powerless to control. Also seizing the opportunity, the Burmese governor of Pegu, Maung Tha Aung, proclaimed himself king of Pegu, He marched up to Syriam, but his troops mutinied and killed him. The king in Ava sent his uncle, Minyae Aung Naing to Pegu to restore order but the citizens of Pegu rose up in arms and murdered him and his detachment. The people then elected a former Gwe Shan monk and proclaimed him king of the Restored Hanthawaddy Kingdom with a title of Smin Htaw Buddhaketi. He was popular but an ineffectual leader reluctant to take charge of the government or command of the army and spent most of his time searching for a white elephant in the jungles.

== Rise of Binnya Dala (Aung Hla) ==
Binnya Dala (Burmese given name: Aung Hla) was reported to have come from Chiang Mai with a herd of elephants. Smin Htaw Buddhaketi appointed him master of the elephants. He rose to the position of prime minister and was the power behind the puppet king. By 1745, Hanthawaddy had successfully established itself in Lower Burma occupying the border towns, Pyay and Taungoo. In 1746, Smin Htaw Buddhaketi abdicated the throne and the ministers proclaimed Binnya Dala as the king. His younger brother was made heir apparent with the title of Upayaza (Uparaja). Binnya Dala declared that the empire of Bayinnaung would again be restored with all its magnificence, prosperity and grandeur and vowed his intention to make the king of Ava and other neighboring kings subordinate to the sovereign of Hanthawaddy. He made Talaban as his commander-in-chief. Mon chronicles recorded that Smin Htaw Buddhaketi was a proficient astrologer and reading his own horoscope, he saw an omen of disaster. In a self-sacrificing spirit, he abdicated the throne, hoping that a leader with good fortune might be able to lead the Hanthawaddy people their destiny.

Binnya Dala assembled a large army of sixty thousand men and a flotilla of war boats to protect the hundreds of boats carrying the provisions needed for the expedition. He procured firearms, cannons and ammunition from European traders and privateers. He brought into service renegade Dutch and native Portuguese.

The full-scale invasion of Upper Burma commenced in the rainy season of 1751. Early in 1752, Binnya Dala invested Ava. Gwe Shans came down from Madaya and joined the invading forces. Ava felled and Mahadhammaraza Dipadi, the last king of the Nyaungyan dynasty was captured with all his family, except two sons who managed to escape to Siam.

After capturing Ava and thinking the conquest was completed, Binnya Dala returned to Pegu, taking with him the captured king and his family. He left Upayaza and Talaban to govern Ava and to exact an oath of allegiance from the Burmese officials, nobles and gentries. Many village headmen submitted and meekly accepted the proscribed oath. This was the high-water mark of the Restored Hanthawaddy Kingdom.

== Rise of Aluangpaya (Aung Zeya) ==
The resistance came from a kyedaing, or hereditary chief, named Aung Zeya from Moksobo who persuaded 46 nearby villages to join him in resistance. One of the Hanthawaddy officer sent a detachment of fifty men to the vicinity of Moksobo and summoned Aung Zeya to appear and take the oath. He came with about twenty men but surprised the detachment and wiped them out. A stronger detachment was then sent and Aung Zeya ambushed them in the jungle and defeated them with a great loss. Aung Zeya then proclaimed himself king and took the name, Alaungpaya (the Embryo Buddha) and founded the Konbaung Dynasty. He renamed Moksobo to Shwebo and fortified the village with stockades and a moat.

Upayaza underestimated the importance of the resistance headed by a petty village officer and made the biggest blunder of the Hanthawaddy Kingdom. He immaturely decided to return to Pegu taking with him twenty thousand men and greater part of the flotilla leaving Talaban to complete the pacification around Shwebo. The rationale for deploying the forces from Ava to Pegu was the perceived Siamese threat arising out of the recent annexation of Upper Tenasserim (Tanintharyi). The existential threat was Upper Burma, not Siam, who was only interested in an opportunistic land grab at that time.

Talaban knew it was necessary to crush the incipient rebellion and led a strong party towards the stronghold but was unable to breach it without the cannons. He withdrew with great losses. Binnya Dala recalled Talaban and replaced him with Taungoo Ngwegunhmu. But the replacement did not change the situation and Hanthawaddy suffered one defeat after another. In the meantime, Alaungpaya was able to raise a large army and consolidated most of Upper Burma by driving the Habthawaddy forces and their ally Gwe Shan. In January 1754, Alaungpaya's seventeen-year-old second son, Hsinbyushin, invested and captured Ava. The commander of Hanthawaddy forces and his men were, however, able to escape to Pegu during the night.

== Fall of Binnya Dala ==
In March 1754, Binnya Dala, finally, sent his entire army headed by Upayaza and Talaban to Upper Burma. They defeated Konbaung forces led by Alaungpaya's sons, Naungdawgyi and Hsinbyushin at Myingyan. One Hanthawaddy army chased Naungdawgyi to Kyaukmyaung near Shwebo. Another chased Hsinbyushin back into Ava. Alaungpaya then counterattacked Myingyan with a heavy force and the Hanthawaddy forces suffered many casualties. Hsinbyushin also broke the siege at Ava. Upayaza retreated towards Pyay and fled by boats to Pegu. Talaban was again left to rally the army and remain before Pyay.

Binnya Dala decided to take Pyay and sent an army headed by his another brother and a son-in-law together with Talaban to besiege the city. Before the army marched out, the imprisoned king of Taungoo, Mahadhammaraza Dipadi, and other captives were put to death, on the pretense they were implicated in a conspiracy. This ill-conceived act was another policy blunder. It removed the one trump card Hanthawaddy had to put back a weaker king on a throne in rivalry to Alaungpaya. The action also pushed the deposed king's loyalists into Alaungpaya's camp. Also, the regional war was turning more and more into an ethnic conflict.

Hanthawaddy forces besieged Pyay in January 1755. Alaungpaya personally led Konbaung army to relieve the city, capturing many firearms, cannons and ammunition and many prisoners of war. Alaugpaya then swept southward with his grand army receiving submission from Taungoo, Hinthada, Myaungmya, Pathein and Thandwe. Then driving through Danubyu, he drove the Hanthawaddy forces out of Dagon, which he renamed it as Yangon (the End of Strife),

=== Battle of Syriam ===
The Hanthawaddy forces retreated and concentrated in a well-fortified Syriam. They were assisted by a brilliant Frenchman, the Sieur de Bruno. Sieur de Bruno came to Pegu in 1751 as a resident agent of Joseph Francois Duplex, the governor-general of Pondicherry (French India) with an ambitious plan to extend French influence in Burma. Bruno succeeded in obtaining a treaty of friendship from Binnya Dala, promising French military aid in return for trade concessions. Alarmed, the English occupied Negrais Island. The chief of the Negrais settlement was Mr. Brooke. Both the French and English East India Companies had factories in Syriam. Both the French and English were equally keen to back the winning side and clandestine negotiations were held frequently between the respective company agents and the belligerents for supply of firearms, cannons, ammunition and active fire support.

In the rainy season of 1755, Alaungpaya left Yangon to handle the northern Shan threats to the capital, leaving the bulk of his army in Yangoon fully entrenched. The Hanthawaddy forces consisting of two French ships, an armed sailing vessel belonging to Binnya Dala and 200 war-boats attacked Konbaung forces at Yangon. When the French ships came into cannon shot, they commenced firing and muskets were fired from Hanthawaddy war-boats on the Konbaung fleet. The Konbaung fleet took shelter in the creek protected by the fire from mangrove and a battery of a few pieces of ship cannons erected in the temporary works on the banks of the river. At the forceful urging of Upayaza to the captains, the private English ships, Hunter and Elizabeth and East India Company ship Ascot commenced fire on the Konbaung fleet. Faced with the withering fire from unexpected foes, the Konbaung forces were obliged to abandon their boats and take shelter in the grove. Reluctant to face the close quarter fire from the grove, the Hanthawaddy forces declined to attempt to capture the Konbaung fleet and instead retreated to Syriam. Had the Hanthawaddy forces pursued the critical opportunity with a little more resolution they might have been able to tip the scale in their favor.

In the meantime, Brooke was advancing his negotiations with Alaungpaya by delegating Captain Baker and Lieutenant North with presents and instructions to conclude a treaty of amity and alliance. Alaungpaya agreed for the English to stay at Negrais but instead of signing any treaty with East India Company, the king sent a letter on a gold leaf, ornamented with precious stones, directly to King George II. King George II completely ignored it.

Hanthawaddy forces made another attempt on Yangon heights and the fortified mangrove. They were again assisted by the Ascot and two private English ships. The English claimed they were forced to participate. Hanthawaddy forces by water consisted of three English and one French ships and 300 war-boats. 10,000 men marched by land. The Konbaung forces concocted an ingenious maneuver: they fastened a number of boats, filled them with combustible materials and floated down these fire-boats down the spring-tide towards the enemy ships lying at anchor. The ships were obliged to weigh anchor and retreat. The French ship narrowly escaped destruction. That brilliant action effectively removed the European ships for that tide and prevented any cooperation with the land forces. The land forces were easily repulsed and they all retreated to Syriam.

Alaungpaya arrived back in Yangon in the beginning of 1756 and immediately attacked Syriam employing a band of 93 specially chosen volunteers who scaled the walls at night and opened the strong wooden gates. Only 20 of the volunteers survived the assault. Most of the Mon officers managed to escape but the Europeans were made prisoners. A vast supply of war material was captured.

Two days after the fall of Syriam, two French relief ships, Galetee and the Fleury, laden with troops, arms, ammunition and food arrived from Pondicherry. A small boat sent by them to ask for a pilot was captured by Konbaung's men. Alaungpaya compelled the captured Bruno to write to the captains to proceed up the river. They did and ran aground and found themselves surrounded by Konbaung's war-boats. On board the ships were two hundred French officers and soldiers who were press-ganged into Konbaung army. The haul included thirty-five ship's guns, five field guns and over a thousand muskets. Bruno and his staff were executed.

=== Battle of Pegu ===
Konbaung army marched from Syriam to Pegu in September 1756 and another army marched south from Taungoo. The combined armies together with the flotilla laid siege to Pegu reducing the citizens by famine to unbearable misery. Binnya Dala decided to send his only unmarried daughter as a peace offering. Talaban, who was betrothed to the princess, protested vehemently and offered to lead a band of six hundred chosen warriors to either raise the siege and pressure an honorable peace or perish in the attempt. But the council and Upayaza supported Binnya Dala's preposition of submission. During the night, Talaban, his family and a devoted band of his followers on elephants and horses forced their way through the besieging lines and escaped to Sittaung. The princess was sent on a palanquin escorted by Upayaza and surrounded by a hundred maiden. Upayaza was detained as a hostage and the princess was consigned to the guardians of the female apartments. For several days, the hostilities were suspended. But Alaungpaya was infiltrating secret agents and arms into the city. They were discovered and were put to death. The hostilities resumed. In 1757, Konbaung forces made a night assault at one of the gates and the defenders fled allowing the besiegers to rush in. The city was given up for plunder and many leading men were put to death. Thousands of men, women and children were sold as slaves. The city walls and the twenty gates, built by Tabinshwehti and Bayinnaung two hundred years ago, were razed to the ground.

=== Aftermath ===
Alaungpaya proceeded to bring into subjection eastward area between Pegu and the borders with Siam. He caught up with Talaban in Mottama. When Talaban learnt the approach of Konbaung forces, he fled into the woods, leaving behind his family and many of his devoted followers. Alaungpaya seized all his family and followers and threatened to execute them. Talaban voluntarily surrendered and when brought into the royal presence pleaded for the release of his family and friends in exchange for his life. Struck by such an instance of magnanimity, Alaungpaya generously forgave Talaban and ordered the captives freed. He afterwards assigned Talaban to a distinguished station in his own service. Talaban served the duties faithfully during the reign of Alaungpaya.

In 1774, Alaungpaya's second son, Hsinbyushin (1763–1776), made a state procession down the Ayawaddy to Yangon. There, he ordered Binnya Dala, who had been in captivity for 17 years, to be charged with exciting the Mon people in their 1773 rebellion. Binnya Dalla was declared guilty and publicly executed.

== Bibliography ==
- Hall, D.G.E (1955). A History of South-East Asia. New York: St Martin's Press Inc.
- Hall, D.G.E (1960). Burma. London: Hutchinson & Co (Ltd). ISBN 978-1-4067-3503-1.
- Hmannan Yazawin (in Burmese). Vol. 3 (2003 ed.). Yangon: Ministry of Information, Myanmar. 1829. p. 382.
- Lieberman, Victor B (2003). Strange Parallels: Southeast Asia in Global Context, c. 800-1830, volume 1, Integration on the Mainland. Cambridge University Press. pp. 202–206. ISBN 978-0-521-80496-7.
- Myint-U, Thant (2006). The River of Lost Footsteps-Histories of Burna. New York: Farrar, Straus and Giroux. ISBN 978-0-374-16342-6.
- Phayre, Sir Arthur P. (1967) [1883]. History of Burma. London: Susil Gupta. pp. 145–148.
- Symes, Michael (Spring 2006). "An Account of an Embassy to the Kingdom of Burma, sent by the Governor-General of India, in the year 1795". SOAS Bulletin of Burma Research. issue 1. 4.

Binnya Dala Restored Hanthawaddy
Regnal titles
Preceded by Smim Htaw Buddhaketi	King of Restored Hanthawaddy; January 1747 – 6 May 1757	Succeeded by Abolished
