= Mahadhammaraza Dipadi =

Mahadhammaraza Dipadi မဟာဓမ္မရာဇာဓိပတိ
- King of Ava; King of Burma

King of Burma
- Reign: 14 November 1733 – 22 March 1752
- Coronation: 8 January 1735
- Predecessor: Taninganway
- Successor: Alaungpaya
- Born: c. 29 March 1714; Thursday, c. Full moon of Late Tagu 1075 ME (Note: The chronicle Zatadawbon Yazawin (Zata 1960: 48) says he was born on a Thursday in 1075 ME (12 April 1713 to 11 April 1714), and lost the throne at age 37 (38th year). According to Hmannan Yazawin (Hmannan Vol. 3 2003: 392, 395), he lost power on Wednesday, 8th waxing of Late Tagu 1113 ME (22 March 1752) at age 37 (38th year). It means, he must have been born after 8th waxing of Late Tagu 1075 ME, on either of the remaining two Thursdays of 1075 ME--full moon of Late Tagu (29 March 1714) or 7th waning of Late Tagu (5 April 1714).); Ava (Inwa)
- Died: 13 October 1754 (aged 40); Sunday, 12th waxing of Thadingyut 1116 ME near Pegu (Bago)
- Consort: Maha Zaneinda Dipadi Dewi; Maha Yaza Dipadi Dewi; Maha Dipadi Dewi
Regnal name
- Siri Pavara Mahādhammarājadhipati
- House: Toungoo
- Father: Taninganway
- Mother: Thiri Maha Mingala Dewi
- Religion: Theravada Buddhism

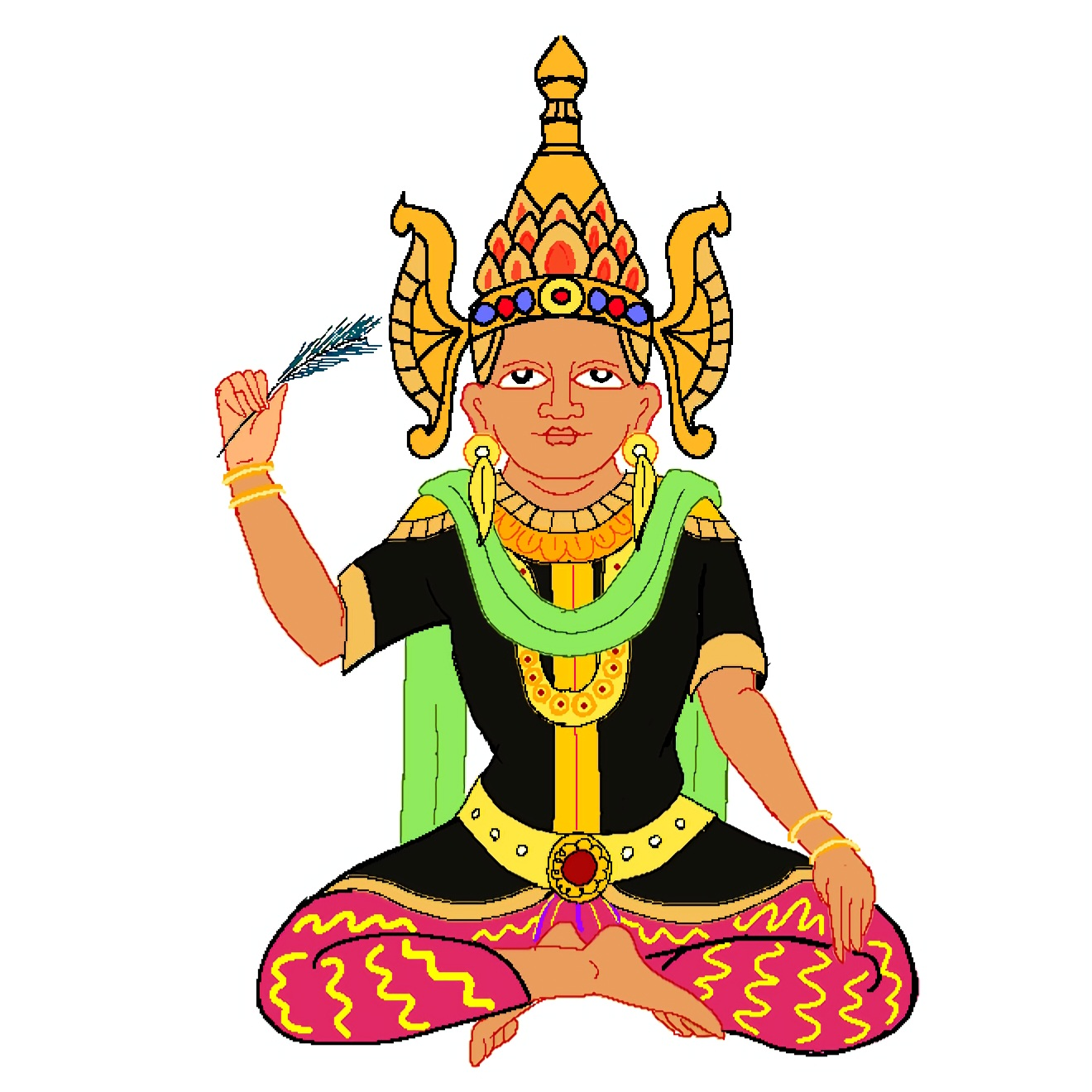
Illustration of the last Neow-Yam king of Ava

Maha Dhammaraza Dipati (Burmese: မဟာ ဓမ္မရာဇာ ဓိပတိ, pronounced [məhà dəma̰jàzà dḭpədḭ]; Pali: Mahā Dhammarājādhipati; 1714–1754), also called the Thursday King (ကြာသပတေးမင်း), Hanthah-wədee-pah-min (ဟံသာဝတီပါမင်း, "Captive to Hanthawaddy") or Lokasaraphū-dāyakā (လောကသရဖူဒါယကာမင်း, "Patron of Lokasaraphu pagoda"), was the last king of restored Toungoo dynasty of Burma (Myanmar) from 1733 to 1752. The young king inherited a kingdom already in severe decline, and his inexperience only made the decline faster, finally resulting in the end of House of Toungoo and the collapse of the kingdom over his 18-year reign.

== Early life ==
The future king was born to Prince Taninganway and his chief queen Thiri Maha Mingala Dewi. He was the fifth child and fourth son of the couple. He was given Singu in fief in his youth. He became the heir presumptive because all three elder brothers died young. He was made the heir apparent on 6 May 1727 (1st waning of Kason 1089 ME).

== Reign ==
Five years into his reign, the armies of Manipur invaded and plundered the northern Burmese provinces. The Burmese were unable to suppress them.

Since the move of capital from Pegu to Ava by King Thalun in 1635, Pegu had become the rallying point for the Mon revival and insurgency. The Burmese governors were readily hated due to heavy corrupted taxation. Taking the advantage of weak royal authority after the Manipur invasions, a Burmese governor rebelled and proclaimed himself the King of Pegu in 1740. The Mons, unwilling to have a Burmese king in Pegu, rioted and murdered the new king. Mahadhammaraza Dipati then installed his uncle as the new governor of Pegu.

Yet the Mons were still unsatisfied and went on to kill Burmese officials in Pegu. The king was then enraged at the Mons and ordered a massacre of the Mons at Pegu. The Gwe Shans (the Shans who were taken as captives from their northern homelands to Pegu by King Bayinnaung in the 16th century) took this opportunity to stage their own rebellion. The Shan armies with supports from the Mons took Pegu in 1740. A popular monk of Shan origin was proclaimed Gwe Min the King of Pegu.

As Ava was largely distracted by another Manipur invasion. The Peguan armies invaded Prome and Ava but failed. They were able to take Toungoo. Thado Minkhaung, the viceroy of Prome and Mahadhammaraza Dipati’s brother, hurried south and took Syriam but was soon repelled. Prome eventually fell to the Mons in 1745. The Mons tried to take Ava again without success.

In 1747, Binnya Dala was proclaimed the King of Pegu. The two sides were unable to overcome each other until 1751 when the crown prince of Pegu (Binnya Dala’s brother) marched the Peguan armies into Upper Irrawaddy and laid siege on Sagaing and Ava. Ava fell to the Mons on 22 March 1752 (Wednesday, 8th waxing of Late Tagu 1113 ME) and Maha Dhammaraza Dipati was taken as captive down to Pegu. Mahadhammaraza Dipati had survived for another two years before being executed in 1754 due to a suspected rebellion.

== Descendants ==
When the Mons occupied Ava, a son of Mahadhammaraza Dipadi, Se-Hang-Rui-Dong (色亢瑞凍) was escaped and recorded in Chinese history, who fled to the Chiefdom of Mengmao in China in 1755 and subsequently fled to Hsenwi State. Hsenwi sawbwa settled him at the east of the Salween River, and he moved to the village named Man-Nong (蛮弄) in 1756, local residents offerred him food. Then in the same year, the headman of Meng-Fang (猛放, a region in Lan Na) invited him to Lan Na. After that, his whereabouts were no longer known.

== Bibliography ==
- Htin Aung, Maung (1967). A History of Burma. New York and London: Cambridge University Press.
- Royal Historians of Burma (c. 1680). U Hla Tin (Hla Thamein) (ed.). Zatadawbon Yazawin (1960 ed.). Historical Research Directorate of the Union of Burma.
- Royal Historical Commission of Burma (1829–1832). Hmannan Yazawin (in Burmese). Vol. 1–3 (2003 ed.). Yangon: Ministry of Information, Myanmar.

Mahadhammaraza Dipadi Toungoo Dynasty Born: c. 29 March 1714 Died: 13 October 1754
Regnal titles
Preceded by Taninganway	King of Burma; 14 November 1733 – 22 March 1752	Succeeded by Alaungpaya
Preceded by Taninganway	Heir to the Burmese Throne; 6 May 1727 – 14 November 1733	Succeeded by Naungdawgyi
