= Me Khway =

Burmese poet during the reign of Bodawpaya

- မယ်ခွေ
- Born: c. 1788; Ava
- Died: c. 1848 (aged 59–60)
- Occupation: Poet
- Spouse: Maung Swet
- Writing career
- Language: Burmese
- Genres: Egyin, Elegy

Me Khway (Burmese: မယ်ခွေ, pronounced [mɛ̀ kʰwè]; c. 1788 – c. 1848) was a Burmese poet during the reigns of King Bodawpaya to King Tharrawaddy. She is regarded as the first composer of 12-month celebration egyins. Since she had composed many egyins, she is also known as E Me Khway (Burmese: အဲမယ်ခွေ).

== Life ==
Me Khway was the youngest daughter of a Sittaung officer– her elder sister was Me Kay, who was also a poet. She married former inheritance officer Maung Swet.

== Works ==
Egyins Me Khway composed are a kind of Shihsepaw E (80's Egyins) (ရှစ်ဆယ်ပေါ်အဲ) which were supposed to firstly compose around 1080 Burmese Era (1718 AD) during the reign of King Taninganway.

Prior to Me Khway, there were only yadu and lutar for the celebration of twelve months of Burma. She started composing egyins about the 12 months.

In addition to 12-month celebration egyins, Me Khway also composed:

- Invocation egyin and yadu of four Buddhas (ဘုရားလေးဆူတိုင် ရတုနှင့်အဲချင်း)
- Elegy in memory of king's aunt, Princess of Dala
- Elegy in memory of the wife of Mongnai State myosa
- Elegy in memory of Prince of Amyint.

Elegy songs composed by Me Khway are the prototype of today's well-known elegy, Discovery of Sonnathar Myaing (စုံနံ့သာမြိုင်ရှာပုံတော်).

A four-stanza verse (or Layzit) of Me Khway named "The Present" is prescribed to 10th graders studying Burmese poetry.
