= Khay Ma Naw =

Khay Ma Naw ခေမနော

Co-chief queen consort of Burma
- Tenure: c. May 1545 – 30 April 1550
- Predecessor: Dhamma Dewi of Toungoo
- Successor: Atula Thiri Maha Yaza Dewi
- Born: Pegu (Bago)
- Spouse: Tabinshwehti
- House: Toungoo
- Mother: Ma Kyaik
- Religion: Theravada Buddhism

Khay Ma Naw (Burmese: ခေမနော, Burmese pronunciation: [kʰè mə nɔ́]) was the chief queen of King Tabinshwehti of Toungoo Dynasty from 1545 to 1550. The ethnic Mon queen was an adopted daughter of wealthy woman in Pegu (Bago), who had found her as a young child in the field by her cattle.

== In popular culture ==
She is one of the characters in the thai television drama Kasattriya (กษัตริยา) in 2003 in name Chao nang Tongsee Portrayed by Chanana Nutakom

== Bibliography ==
- Htin Aung, Maung (1967). A History of Burma. New York and London: Cambridge University Press.
- Sein Lwin Lay, Kahtika U (1968). Mintaya Shwe Hti and Bayinnaung: Ketumadi Taungoo Yazawin (in Burmese) (2006, 2nd printing ed.). Yangon: Yan Aung Sarpay.

Khay Ma Naw Toungoo Dynasty
Royal titles
Preceded by Dhamma Dewi	Co-chief queen consort of Burma; 1545–1550	Succeeded by Atula Thiri
