= Narawara =

Narawara နရာဝရ
- King of Toungoo

King of Burma
- Reign: 14 April 1672 – 27 February 1673
- Coronation: 1 May 1672; 5th waxing of Kason 1034 ME
- Predecessor: Pye
- Successor: Minyekyawdin
- Chief Minister: Sithu Nawrahta
- Born: July 1650; Tuesday, Waso 1012 ME (Note: (Zata 1960: 48): Tuesday in Waso 1012 ME = 5, 12, 19, 26 July 1650)
- Died: 27 February 1673 (aged 22); 12th waxing of Tabaung 1034 ME; Ava (Inwa)
- Burial: 28 February 1673; Inwa Palace
- Consort: None
- Issue: None
Names
- Maha Thiha Thudhamma Yaza
- House: Toungoo
- Father: Pye
- Mother: Khin Ma Latt
- Religion: Theravada Buddhism

Narawara (Burmese: နရာဝရ, pronounced [nəɹàwəɹa̰]; 1650–1673) was king of Toungoo dynasty of Burma (Myanmar), who ruled for about 11 months between 1672 and 1673. Narawara ascended to the Burmese throne after his father Pye died in 1672. But Narawara died young and was succeeded by his brother Minyekyawdin.

== Early life ==
Narawara was the only son and middle child of the three children of King Pye and his chief queen Khin Ma Latt. He was born in 1650. He became the heir apparent on 1 June 1664 (Sunday, 8th waxing of Nayon 1026 ME).

== Bibliography ==
- Harvey, G. E. (1925). History of Burma: From the Earliest Times to 10 March 1824. London: Frank Cass & Co. Ltd.
- Kala, U (1724). Maha Yazawin (in Burmese). Vol. 1–3 (2006, 4th printing ed.). Yangon: Ya-Pyei Publishing.
- Royal Historians of Burma (c. 1680). U Hla Tin (Hla Thamein) (ed.). Zatadawbon Yazawin (1960 ed.). Historical Research Directorate of the Union of Burma.
- Royal Historical Commission of Burma (1829–1832). Hmannan Yazawin (in Burmese). Vol. 1–3 (2003 ed.). Yangon: Ministry of Information, Myanmar.

Narawara Toungoo Dynasty Born: July 1650 Died: 27 February 1673
Regnal titles
Preceded by Pye	King of Burma; 14 April 1672 – 27 February 1673	Succeeded by Minyekyawdin
Royal titles
Preceded by Narazeya	Heir to the Burmese Throne; 1 June 1664 – 14 April 1672	Succeeded by Sanay
