= Atula Thiri Maha Yaza Dewi =

Empress consort of Burma

Atula Thiri Maha Yaza Dewi အတုလသီရိ မဟာရာဇဒေဝီ

Chief queen consort of Burma
- Tenure: 30 April 1550 – 15 June 1568
- Coronation: 11 January 1551; 12 January 1554
- Predecessor: Dhamma Dewi and Khay Ma Naw
- Successor: Sanda Dewi
- Born: c. 1518; Toungoo (Taungoo)
- Died: 15 June 1568 (aged 49-50); Tuesday, 7th waning of 1st Waso 930 ME; Pegu (Bago)
- Burial: Pegu
- Spouse: Bayinnaung
- Issue: Inwa Mibaya; Nanda
Names
- Agga-Mahethi Atula Thiri Maha Yaza Dewi
- House: Toungoo
- Father: Mingyi Nyo
- Mother: Yadana Dewi
- Religion: Theravada Buddhism

Atula Thiri Maha Yaza Dewi (Burmese: အတုလသီရိ မဟာရာဇ ဒေဝီ [ʔətṵla̰ θìɹḭ məhà jàza̰ dèwì]; Pali: Atulasīrimahārājadevī; c. 1518–1568), more commonly known as Khin Khin Jee (ခင်ခင်ကြီး), was the chief queen consort of King Bayinnaung of Burma (Myanmar) from 1550 to 1568. The queen was of Toungoo royalty, daughter of King Mingyi Nyo and younger half-sister of King Tabinshwehti. She was the mother of King Nanda. Her 1534 marriage to Bayinnaung, a commoner, solidified an unfailing alliance between Tabinshwehti and Bayinnaung who together would go on to found the Toungoo Empire (or the Second Burmese Empire).

== Early life ==
The future queen of Burma was born Princess Thakin Gyi (သခင်ကြီး) in Toungoo (Taungoo) to King Mingyi Nyo and Khin Nwe (ခင်နွယ်), Princess of Mobye (Mong Pai). Commonly known as Khin Gyi (ခင်ကြီး), the princess was likely half-Shan, a product of the system of marriage alliances among the small kingdoms that dominated Burma at the time. Her maternal grandfather was the sawbwa (chief) of the Shan state of Mobye (present-day northern Kayah State), which was a tributary of the Shan state of Thibaw (Hsipaw). Indeed, Thibaw in turn was a tributary and the only reliable ally of Ava, whose authority Mingyi Nyo had spurned in 1510. (The princess was likely related to Hkonmaing of Thibaw and his son Narapati III of Mobye who became kings of Ava between 1542 and 1551.)

When she reached teenage, the princess became romantically involved with a commoner, one Ye Htut (later Bayinnaung), who was a close confidant and adviser of her brother the king. Circa April 1534, (Note: The Hmannan Yazawin chronicle (Hmannan Vol. 3 2003: 61) only gives 896 ME (29 March 1534 to 29 March 1535) for the date of the marriage between Bayinnaung and Thakin Gyi (Atula Thiri). But they must have got married in early 896 ME around April 1534 since the couple had their second child, Nanda Bayin, in November 1535.) their affair was discovered, which under Burmese law constituted an act of treason. Some suggested to Ye Htut that he should mutiny. He refused and submitted to arrest, saying that although it was no crime to for a young man to love a young woman, it was an unpardonable crime for a soldier to break his oath of allegiance. Tabinshwehti deliberated at length with his ministers, and finally came to the conclusion that Ye Htut should be given his sister in marriage, and a princely title of Kyawhtin Nawrahta. With this decision, Tabinshwehti won the loyalty of his brother-in-law "without parallel in Burmese history". Ye Htut later received the title Bayinnaung (lit. "King's Elder Brother").

== Chief queen ==
Atula Thiri bore Bayinnaung a daughter and a son, early in their marriage 1534–1535. She saw her husband only a few times a year as Bayinnaung and Tabinshwehti were always away on their military campaigns: Lower Burma (1534–1541), Prome and Pagan (1542–1545), Arakan (1545–1547), and Siam (1547–1549). Indeed, her only son Nanda, then only 12, went on the 1548–1549 Siamese campaign alongside his father and uncle.

Her accession as the chief queen of Burma was not a smooth one. When her brother the king was assassinated by one of his close advisers in April 1550, her husband was on a campaign to hunt down the rebels in the Irrawaddy delta. When she received the news by messenger at Pegu, she urgently forwarded the message to her husband on campaign at Dala (present-day Yangon). She immediately left Pegu, which had been taken over by rival claimants to the throne, with her two children for Dala.

Atula Thiri became the chief queen on 11 January 1551 when Bayinnaung was proclaimed king at his native city of Toungoo. At Bayinnaung's coronation ceremony on 12 January 1554 (Friday, 10th waxing of Tabodwe 915 ME), she sat alongside the king, taking the title of Agga Mahethi (Pali: Aggamahesī, "Chief Queen-Consort"). Next year, their only daughter, elder sister of Nanda, was married off to Thado Minsaw of Ava, the youngest half-brother of Bayinnaung, in the tradition of Burmese royalty. Also in 1555, Bayinnaung sent rich presents to the Temple of the Tooth at Kandy in Ceylon, and bought land there to keep lights continually burning at the shrine. The craftsmen he sent beautified the temple. He also sent brooms made out of his hair and Atula's to sweep the temple.

The queen died on 15 June 1568 (Tuesday, 7th waning of 1st Waso 930) at Pegu while her husband and her son were preparing for their next campaign in Siam. The Burmese chronicles uncharacteristically report that the king was extremely shaken and saddened by the death of his first love.

== In popular culture ==
She was portrayed as a character in Thai television drama many stories namely Phu Chana Sip Thit(Conqueror of the Ten Directions)(ผู้ชนะสิบทิศ) in the name Tala mae Chandra in The novel has been adapted as a television drama numerous times, including in 1958 Portrayed by darek satachan, 1971 Portrayed by Sahima sasiri, 1980 Portrayed by nantawan mekyai, 1983 Portrayed by dongjai hathaikan, 1989 Portrayed by natthaya dengBuhnga, and most recently 2013 Portrayed by Prisna kamphu siri., and the as a character in Thai television drama namely kasattriya (กษัตริยา) 2003 in the name Chao Nang Ta kengji Portrayed by Ganjana Jindawat. It appeared in the scene of In Part 1 of the 2007 King Naresuan film series, which she side seated of king Bayinnaung. And she is the very prominent character of thai television dramas jomjai ayothaya (จอมใจอโยธยา) in 2025 in name Chandratevi Portrayed by Kwanruedee klomglom.

== Bibliography ==
- Harvey, G. E. (1925). History of Burma: From the Earliest Times to 10 March 1824. London: Frank Cass & Co. Ltd.
- Htin Aung, Maung (1967). A History of Burma. New York and London: Cambridge University Press.
- Royal Historical Commission of Burma (1832). Hmannan Yazawin (in Burmese). Vol. 1–3 (2003 ed.). Yangon: Ministry of Information, Myanmar.

Atula Thiri Maha Yaza Dewi Toungoo Dynasty Born: c. 1518 Died: 15 June 1568
Royal titles
Preceded by Dhamma Dewi and Khay Ma Naw	Chief queen consort of Burma; 30 April 1550 – 15 June 1568	Succeeded by Sanda Dewi
