= Dhamma Dewi of Toungoo =

Dhamma Dewi ဓမ္မဒေဝီ

Chief queen consort of Burma
- Tenure: 24 November 1530 – 30 April 1550
- Predecessor: Soe Min Hteik-Tin
- Successor: Khay Ma Naw; Atula Thiri Maha Yaza Dewi
- Born: c. 1514/15; Toungoo (Taungoo)
- Died: c. 1580s
- Spouse: Tabinshwehti
- Issue: Hanthawaddy Mibaya?
- House: Toungoo
- Father: Mingyi Swe
- Mother: Shin Myo Myat
- Religion: Theravada Buddhism

Dhamma Dewi (Burmese: ဓမ္မဒေဝီ, pronounced [dəma̰dèwì]; Pali: Dhammadevī) was one of three principal queens of King Tabinshwehti of Toungoo Dynasty and the elder sister of King Bayinnaung. She was born Khin Hpone Soe (ခင်ဘုန်းစိုး, [kʰɪ̀ɴ pʰóʊɴ só]), a commoner daughter of royal servants of Prince Tabinshwehti. In November 1530, the prince ascended to the throne as king, and raised her as one of his two principal queens. The queen, who was at least a year older than the king, is said to have been the king's favorite until 1545 when the king raised Khay Ma Naw as his co-chief queen.

She lived out her life in Toungoo (Taungoo), and was still alive in 1577. She attended the umbrella raising ceremony of the Maha Wizaya Pagoda by Bayinnaung in Pegu (Bago), which took place on 27 April 1577. Her brother then honored her in a separate ceremony.

== Bibliography ==
- Kala, U (1724). Maha Yazawin (in Burmese). Vol. 1–3 (2006, 4th printing ed.). Yangon: Ya-Pyei Publishing.
- Sein Lwin Lay, Kahtika U (1968). Mintaya Shwe Hti and Bayinnaung: Ketumadi Taungoo Yazawin (in Burmese) (2006, 2nd printing ed.). Yangon: Yan Aung Sarpay.

Dhamma Dewi of Toungoo Toungoo Dynasty Born: c. 1514 Died: c. 1580s
Royal titles
| Preceded by Soe Min Hteik-Tin | Chief queen consort of Burma; 24 November 1530 – 30 April 1550 | Succeeded by Khay Ma Naw; Atula Thiri Maha Yaza Dewi |
