= Yadana Dewi of Toungoo =

Yadana Dewi ရတနာ ဒေဝီ

Queen of the Central Palace of Toungoo
- Reign: 1510s – 1530
- Predecessor: new office
- Successor: Yaza Dewi
- Born: 1490s Mong Pai (Mobye)
- Spouse: Mingyi Nyo
- Issue: Thakin Gyi
- House: Toungoo
- Father: Saopha of Mong Pai
- Mother: Maha Dewi of Mong Pai
- Religion: Theravada Buddhism

Yadana Dewi (Burmese: ရတနာ ဒေဝီ, pronounced [jədənà dèwì]; Pali: Ratanadevī) was one of the five principal queens of King Mingyi Nyo of Toungoo Dynasty and the mother of Atula Thiri Maha Yaza Dewi, the chief queen of King Bayinnaung. The third ranked queen of the five queens was a daughter of Hso Nyen Hpa or Nawn Ging Hpa the saopha (chief) of Mong Pai (Mobye). Her birth name was Khin Nwe (ခင်နွဲ့) according to standard chronicles, or Khin Hnin Nwe (ခင်နှင်းနွဲ့), according to the Toungoo Yazawin chronicle.

== Bibliography ==
- Sein Lwin Lay, Kahtika U (1968). Mintaya Shwe Hti and Bayinnaung: Ketumadi Taungoo Yazawin (in Burmese) (2006, 2nd printing ed.). Yangon: Yan Aung Sarpay.

Yadana Dewi of Toungoo Toungoo Dynasty
Royal titles
New title	Queen of the Central Palace of Toungoo; 1510s – 1530	Succeeded by Yaza Dewi
