= Restored Hanthawaddy Kingdom =

State in southern Myanmar (1740 to 1757)

Coordinates: 17°19′27″N 96°28′13″E

Hanthawaddy Kingdom Hongsarwatoi Kingdom ဟံသာဝတီပြည်
- 1740–1757
- Flag
- Status: Kingdom
- Capital: Pegu (1740–1757)
- Common languages: Mon
- Religion: Theravada Buddhism
- Government: Monarchy
  - 1740–1747: Smim Htaw Buddhaketi
  - 1747–1757: Binnya Dala
- History
  - Founding of Kingdom: 29 November 1740
  - War with Toungoo Dynasty: 1740–1752
  - Rise of Binnya Dala: 1747
  - Invasion of Upper Burma: 1751–1752
  - Konbaung-Hanthawaddy War: 1752–1757
  - Fall of Kingdom: 6 May 1757
Preceded by	Succeeded by
Toungoo Dynasty	Konbaung Dynasty
- Today part of: Myanmar

The Restored Hanthawaddy Kingdom (Burmese: ဟံသာဝတီ နေပြည်တော်သစ်) was the kingdom that ruled Lower Burma and parts of Upper Burma from 1740 to 1757. The kingdom grew out of a rebellion by the Mon led population of Pegu, who then rallied the other Mon as well as Delta Bama and Karens of Lower Burma, against the Toungoo Dynasty of Ava in Upper Burma. The rebellion succeeded in expelling Toungoo loyalists and restored the Mon-speaking Kingdom of Hanthawaddy which had ruled Lower Burma from 1287 to 1539. The restored Hanthawady kingdom also claim heritage to Bayinaung's early Toungoo Empire whose capital was based in Pegu and guaranteed the loyalty of the non-Mon population of Lower Burma. Supported by the French, the upstart kingdom quickly carved out a space for itself in Lower Burma, and continued its push northward. In March 1752, its forces captured Ava, and ended the 266-year-old Toungoo dynasty.

A new dynasty called Konbaung led by King Alaungpaya rose in Upper Burma to challenge the southern forces, and went on to conquer all of Upper Burma by December 1753. After Hanthawaddy's invasion of Upper Burma failed in 1754, the kingdom came unglued. Its leadership in self-defeating measures killed off the Toungoo royal family, and persecuted loyal ethnic Burmans in the south, both of which only strengthened Alaungpaya's hand. In 1755, Alaungpaya invaded Lower Burma. Konbaung forces captured the Irrawaddy delta in May 1755, the French defended port of Thanlyin in July 1756, and finally the capital Pegu in May 1757.

The fall of Restored Hanthawaddy was the beginning of the end of Mon people's centuries-old dominance of Lower Burma. Konbaung armies' reprisals forced thousands of Mons to flee to Siam. By the early 19th century, assimilation, inter-marriage, and mass migration of Burman families from the north had reduced the Mon population to a small minority.

== Rise of southern kingdom ==
The southern rebellion was the most serious threat to the Toungoo Dynasty, which was already on its last legs. Its weak kings had been unable to stem the constant raids on the Chindwin river valley by the Meiteis since 1724, or put down a nagging rebellion in Lan Na in the east since 1727. The Ava-appointed governor at Pegu was assassinated on 29 November [O.S. 18 November] 1740 by the local court. The court elected a Mon-speaking Burman of royal lineage with the Mon title of Smim Htaw Buddhaketi, as king of Hanthawaddy on 8 December [O.S. 27 November] 1740. (Note: (Lieberman 1984: 215–216): His forces attacked Syriam on 15 December [O.S. 4 December] 1740, a week after his accession.)

In 1742, the Hanthawaddy forces started raiding annually up the Irrawaddy river as far as Ava. By 1745, Hanthawaddy controlled much of Lower Burma, and parts of Upper Burma up to Prome and Toungoo. (The new kingdom did not control the northern Tenasserim coast. The rulers of Martaban (Mottama) and Tavoy (Dawei) sought and received Siamese protection.)

The low grade warfare continued until November 1751 when Binnya Dala, who succeeded Smim Htaw as king in 1747, launched a full-scale invasion of Upper Burma. The Hanthawaddy armies gradually advanced north, and finally sacked the capital city of Ava in March 1752. The royal family was deported to Pegu. Mistakenly thinking that Upper Burma had been won, the Hanthawaddy leadership prematurely returned to Pegu, leaving only a third of the forces led by Gen. Dalaban to mop up the final resistance in upcountry Burma.

== Fall ==
The inevitable Burman resistance came swiftly. In March 1752, a village headman of Moksobo named Aung Zeya founded the Konbaung Dynasty with the title of Alaungpaya to resist the Mon occupation. Alaungpaya rapidly gained a following from all over Upper Burma. By December 1752, he had reconquered all of Upper Burma north of Ava, and the city itself a year later. In March 1754, Binnya Dala invaded Upper Burma with the entire army. The invasion went well at first, laying siege to Ava and advancing deep into upcountry but ultimately faltered, driven back with heavy losses.

Following the defeat, the leadership of Hanthawaddy escalated its "self-defeating" policies of ethnic polarization in the south. It executed all Avan captives, including the last king of Toungoo, and began requiring all Burmans in the south to wear an earring with a stamp of the Pegu heir-apparent and to cut their hair in Mon fashion as a sign of loyalty.

In 1755, Alaungpaya began the southern push, capturing the Irrawaddy delta in April and Dagon (now Yangon) in May. The French defended port city of Syriam (Thanlyin) was taken only after a 14-month siege in July 1756. With French support cut off, the end of the kingdom followed. The capital Pegu fell on 6 May 1757.

== Legacy ==
The fall of the kingdom was the end of independence for the Mon people as well as their centuries-old dominance of Lower Burma. Konbaung armies' indiscriminate sacking of the low country forced thousands of Mons to flee to Siam. Ethnic Burman families from the north also began settling in the delta. By the early 19th century, assimilation and inter-marriage had reduced the Mon population to a small minority.

== Bibliography ==
- Harvey, G. E. (1925). History of Burma: From the Earliest Times to 10 March 1824. London: Frank Cass & Co. Ltd.
- Lieberman, Victor B. (1984). Burmese Administrative Cycles: Anarchy and Conquest, c. 1580–1760. Princeton University Press. ISBN 0-691-05407-X.
- Lieberman, Victor B. (2003). Strange Parallels: Southeast Asia in Global Context, c. 800–1830, volume 1, Integration on the Mainland. Cambridge University Press. ISBN 978-0-521-80496-7.
- Myint-U, Thant (2006). The River of Lost Footsteps—Histories of Burma. Farrar, Straus and Giroux. ISBN 978-0-374-16342-6.
- Phayre, Lt. Gen. Sir Arthur P. (1883). History of Burma (1967 ed.). London: Susil Gupta.
- Royal Historical Commission of Burma (1832). Hmannan Yazawin (in Burmese). Vol. 1–3 (2003 ed.). Yangon: Ministry of Information, Myanmar.
