= Minye Kyawhtin =

Minye Kyawhtin မင်းရဲကျော်ထင်
- King of Toungoo

King of Burma
- Reign: 27 February 1673 – 4 May 1698
- Predecessor: Narawara
- Successor: Sanay
- Born: c. April 1651 (Tuesday born)
- Died: 4 May 1698 (aged 47); Sunday, 11th waning of Kason 1060 ME; Ava (Inwa)
- Burial: 5 May 1698; Inwa Palace
- Consort: Atula Thiri; Sanda Dewi; Yaza Dewi
- Issue: Sanay Min
Names
- Thiri Pawara Ti-Bawana Thiha Thura Agga Panita Maha Dhamma Yaza
- House: Toungoo
- Father: Ne Myo Ye Kyaw of Pindale
- Mother: Khin Ma Min Sit
- Religion: Theravada Buddhism

Minye Kyawhtin (Burmese: မင်းရဲကျော်ထင်, pronounced [mɪ́ɰ̃jɛ́ tɕɔ̀dɪ̀ɰ̃]; also transliterated as Minyekyawdin 1651–1698) was king of Toungoo dynasty of Burma (Myanmar) from 1673 to 1698. Minye Kyawhtin, governor of Pindale, was elected by the ministers of the court over several elder princes as king after his step-brother King Narawara's sudden death in 1673. The group of nobles that had supported the king gained power and purged other groups of the nobles and royalties. The power of the kingdom gradually declined during his quarter-century rule. Burma was attacked by Siam during his reign.

It was in his reign that Zatadawbon Yazawin, formerly a simple constantly updated list of regnal dates of all Burmese dynasties, was made into a full chronicle.

== Early life ==
The future king was born to Ne Myo Ye Kyaw, a minor prince, and his half-sister Khin Ma Min Sit c. April 1651. (Note: Based on Hmannan's reporting (Hmannan Vol. 3 2003: 321), the king was born on a Tuesday between 7 March 1651 and 9 May 1651. (Hmannan Vol. 3 2003: 321): Minye Kyawhtin came to power at age 21 (his 22nd year), and died at age 47 (48th year). Since he came to power on 12th waxing of Tabaung 1034 ME (27 February 1673), and he died on 11th waning of Kason 1060 ME (4 May 1698), he must have been born some time between 13th waxing of Tabaung 1012 ME (4 March 1651) and 10th waning of Kason 1013 ME (14 May 1651). Because Hmannan also says he was born on a Tuesday, he was born between 7 March (the first Tuesday in the range) and 9 May of 1651 (the last Tuesday).) Both of his parents were children of King Thalun by different minor queens, and the two siblings were married in Waso 1010 ME (10 June 1649 to 9 July 1649). Minye Kyawhtin was given Yamethin, a key city in central Burma, in fief by his grandfather king. He was given the title "Minye Kyawhtin" on 1 May 1672 (5th waxing of Kason 1034 ME) by his step-brother King Narawara at his coronation ceremony.

Minye Kyawhtin was elected to be king about 11 months later when King Narawara suddenly died without leaving an heir. The court, led by minister Sithu Nawrahta, decided on Minye Kyawhtin over several elder and more senior princes, some of whom were sons of King Pye, thinking that they could control him. The court and the young king killed off two elder princes who refused to take the oath of loyalty, and fought off assassination attempts by King Pye's sons, who were Minye Kyawhtin's uncles.

== Bibliography ==
- Aung-Thwin, Michael A.; Maitrii Aung-Thwin (2012). A History of Myanmar Since Ancient Times (illustrated ed.). Honolulu: University of Hawai'i Press. ISBN 978-1-86189-901-9.
- Charney, Michael W. (2006). Powerful Learning: Buddhist Literati and the Throne in Burma's Last Dynasty, 1752–1885. Ann Arbor: University of Michigan.
- Kala, U (1724). Maha Yazawin (in Burmese). Vol. 1–3 (2006, 4th printing ed.). Yangon: Ya-Pyei Publishing.
- Phayre, Lt. Gen. Sir Arthur P. (1883). History of Burma (1967 ed.). London: Susil Gupta.
- Royal Historical Commission of Burma (1829–1832). Hmannan Yazawin (in Burmese). Vol. 1–3 (2003 ed.). Yangon: Ministry of Information, Myanmar.

Minye Kyawhtin Toungoo Dynasty Born: c. April 1651 Died: 4 May 1698
Regnal titles
Preceded by Narawara	King of Burma; 27 February 1673 – 4 May 1698	Succeeded by Sanay
Preceded by	Governor of Yamethin; 1660s – 1673	Succeeded by
