= Sanay Min =

Sanay Min စနေမင်း
- King of Toungoo, The King who born in Saturday

King of Burma
- Reign: 4 May 1698 – 22 August 1714
- Coronation: 24 July 1698
- Predecessor: Minye Kyawhtin
- Successor: Taninganway
- Born: c. 1 April 1673; Saturday, Late Tagu 1034 ME (Note: (Zata 1960: 48): He was born on a Saturday in Late Tagu of 1034 ME (18 March to 10 April 1673). It means he was born on one of the following Saturdays: 18 March, 25 March, 1 April or 8 April 1673); Ava (Inwa)
- Died: 22 August 1714 (aged 41); Wednesday, 14th waxing of Tawthalin 1076 ME (Note: (Hmannan Vol. 3 2003: 353): Wednesday, 14th waxing of Tawthalin 1076 = 22 August [O.S. 11 August] 1714); Ava
- Burial: 23 August 1714 (Note: (Hmannan Vol. 3 2003: 353): The king was cremated a day later his death in the Inwa Palace.); Inwa Palace
- Consort: Maha Dewi; Thiri Dewi; Nanda Dewi
- Issue: Taninganway
Names
- Thiri Maha Thiha Thura Dhamma Yaza
- House: Toungoo
- Father: Minye Kyawhtin
- Mother: Sanda Dewi
- Religion: Theravada Buddhism

Sanay Min (Burmese: စနေမင်း, pronounced [sənè mɪ́ɰ̃]; lit. "Saturday King"; c. 1 April 1673 – 22 August [O.S. 11 August] 1714) was the 13th king of Toungoo dynasty of Burma (Myanmar) who reigned from 1698 to 1714. Sanay ascended to throne after his father Minye Kyawhtin died in 1698. Sanay was – like his father – ineffectual, and the power of Toungoo dynasty continued to decline.

== Early life ==
Sanay Min was born to King Minye Kyawhtin and his queen Sanda Dewi (née Khin Ma Shwe San Oo) c. April 1673. He was given Dabayin in fief, and was known as Debayin Mintha in his youth. He was made heir apparent on 8 September 1688 (Wednesday, 14th waxing of Tawthalin 1050 ME).

== Reign ==
In 1707, Sanay brought Muslim prisoners of war from Sandoway and settled them in Myedu. Three thousand Muslims from the weakening Kingdom of Mrauk U took refuge under his rule from 1698 to 1714. These refugees were divided and settled in Taungoo, Yamethin, Nyaung Yan, Yin Daw, Meiktila, Pin Dale, Tabet Swe', Bhodhii, Syi Tha, Siputtara, Myae du and Depayin.

Sanay Min also had two flotillas, named Elahee and Selamat, both Arabic Islamic names. These ships were recorded to have called at Forte St. George. The Elahee was used to send for missionaries exchanged between the Mughal Empire and the Burmese kingdom, being captained by an Arab. The diplomatic relations between the Court of Ava and Muslim Court of the Moghul began in 1706, with an exchange of gifts recorded by the English factory in Madras.

== Bibliography ==
- Kala, U (1724). Maha Yazawin Gyi (in Burmese). Vol. 1–3 (2006, 4th printing ed.). Yangon: Ya-Pyei Publishing.
- Phayre, Lt. Gen. Sir Arthur P. (1883). History of Burma (1967 ed.). London: Susil Gupta.
- Royal Historians of Burma (c. 1680). U Hla Tin (Hla Thamein) (ed.). Zatadawbon Yazawin (1960 ed.). Historical Research Directorate of the Union of Burma.
- Royal Historical Commission of Burma (1829–1832). Hmannan Yazawin (in Burmese). Vol. 1–3 (2003 ed.). Yangon: Ministry of Information, Myanmar.
- Shin, Ba (1961). Coming of Islam to Burma Down to 1700 A.D. New Delhi: Azad Bhavan. OCLC 81267926.

Sanay Min Toungoo Dynasty Born: c. 1 April 1673 Died: 22 August 1714
Regnal titles
Preceded by Minye Kyawhtin	King of Burma; 4 May 1698 – 22 August 1714	Succeeded by Taninganway Min
Preceded by Narawara	Heir to the Burmese Throne; 8 September 1688 – 4 May 1698	Succeeded by Taninganway Min
