= Lower Myanmar =

Geographic and historic region of Burma

Coordinates: 18°N 96°E

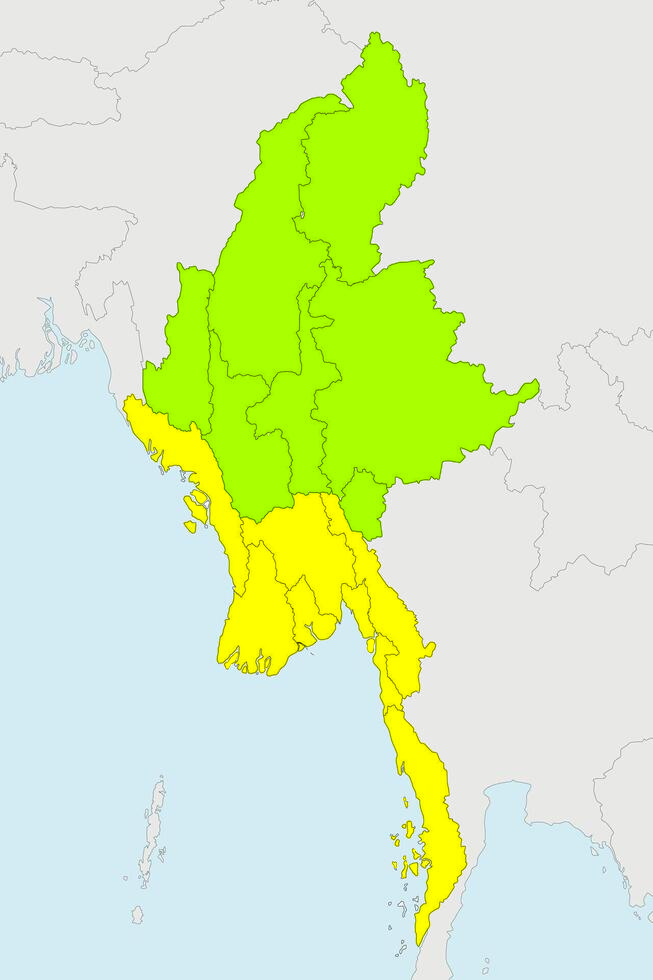
Green represents Upper Myanmar and Yellow represents Lower Myanmar

Lower Myanmar (Burmese: အောက်မြန်မာပြည်, also called Lower Burma) is a geographic region of Myanmar and includes the low-lying Irrawaddy Delta (Ayeyarwady, Bago and Yangon Regions), as well as coastal regions of the country (Rakhine, Kayin and Mon States and Tanintharyi Region).

In the Burmese language, people originating from Upper Myanmar are typically called a-nya-tha for men and a-nya-thu for women, whereas those from Lower Myanmar are called auk tha (အောက်သား) for men and auk thu for women.

== History ==
The territories of present day Lower Myanmar was part of Pagan Kingdom until the end of 13th century. After the collapse of Pagan Kingdom, the territories become Martaban Hanthawaddy kingdom founded by King Wareru. From the 16th century to the middle of 18th century, Pagu was a province of Toungoo Dynasty. In 1752, Restored Hanthawaddy Kingdom successfully overthrown Toungoo Dynasty but later conquered by Konbaung Dynasty led by King Alaungpaya. So, Pegu became a province of Konbaung Dynasty with the name of Lower Province (အောက်ပြည်). After the loss of Second Anglo-Burmese War, East India Company annexed Lower Province, Prome and Toungoo. Lower Province was divided into Irrawaddy Division, Pegu Division, Toungoo District and Salween District of Tenasareim Division.

Historically, Lower Myanmar referred to the part of Myanmar annexed by the British Empire after the end of the Second Anglo-Burmese War in 1852, Arakan Province and Tavoy(Tenasserim) Province which the British had taken control of in 1826 through the Treaty of Yandabo. Lower Myanmar was centred at Rangoon, and composed of all of the coast of modern Myanmar, and also the lower basin of the Irrawaddy River, including Prome. Until the early 19th century, Lower Myanmar was predominantly populated by the Mon and Karen tribes and was a historical stronghold of the Mon people.

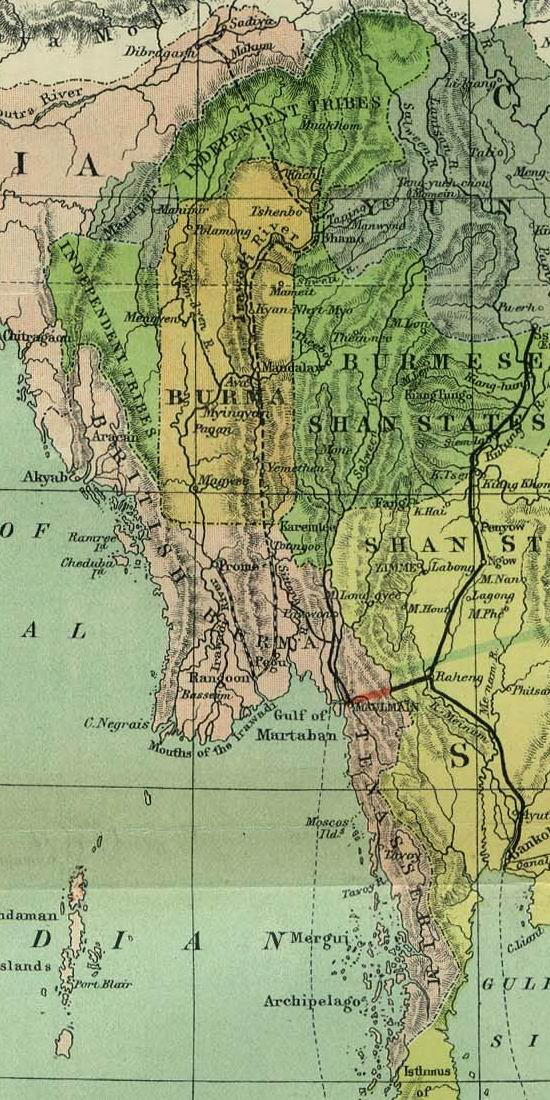
Lower Burma in pink, as opposed to Upper Myanmar in orange, 1886
