= Taninganway Min =

Taninganway Min တနင်္ဂနွေမင်း
- King of Toungoo, The King who born in Sunday

King of Burma
- Reign: 22 August 1714 – 14 November 1733
- Coronation: 22 August 1714
- Predecessor: Sanay
- Successor: Maha Dhamma Yaza Dipadi
- Born: c. June 1689; Sunday, 1051 ME; Ava (Inwa)
- Died: 14 November 1733 (aged 44); Saturday, 9th waxing of Nadaw 1095 ME (Note: (Hmannan Vol. 3 2003: 365–366): Saturday, 9th waxing of Nadaw 1095 ME = 14 November August [O.S. 3 November] 1733); Ava (Inwa)
- Burial: 15 November 1733; Inwa Palace
- Consort: Chakpa Makhao Ngambi (of Ningthouja dynasty), Thiri Maha Mingala Dewi; Thiri Sanda Dewi; Dhamma Dewi
- Issue: Maha Dhamma Yaza Dipadi
Names
- Thiri Parawa Maha Dhamma Yaza Dipadi
- House: Toungoo
- Father: Sanay
- Mother: Maha Dewi
- Religion: Theravada Buddhism

Taninganway Min (Burmese: တနင်္ဂနွေမင်း, pronounced [tənɪ́ɰ̃ɡənwè mɪ́ɰ̃]; lit. 'Sunday King'; c. 1689 – 14 November 1733) was king of the Toungoo dynasty of Burma (Myanmar) from 1714 to 1733. The long and slow descent of the dynasty finally came to the forefront during his reign in the form of internal and external instabilities. He faced a rebellion by his uncle Governor of Pagan at his accession. In the northwest, the Manipuri horsemen raided Burmese territory in early 1724. The retaliatory expedition to Manipur in November 1724 failed. In the east, southern Lan Na (Chiang Mai), under Burmese rule since 1558, successfully revolted in 1727. Taninganway tried to recapture the breakaway region twice but both tries failed. By 1732, southern Lan Na was independent although a strong Burmese garrison in Chiang Saen in northern Lan Na confined the rebellion to the Ping valley around Chiang Mai.

In 1724, U Kala completed Maha Yazawin (the Great Chronicle), the first comprehensive national chronicle of Burmese history based on earlier sources.

== Early life ==
He was born to the heir apparent Prince Sanay and his chief queen Maha Dewi in 1689. He was made heir apparent on 1 November 1711 (Sunday, 8th waning of Tazaungmon 1073 ME).

== Bibliography ==
- Harvey, G. E. (1925). History of Burma: From the Earliest Times to 10 March 1824. London: Frank Cass & Co. Ltd.
- Lieberman, Victor B. (2003). Strange Parallels: Southeast Asia in Global Context, c. 800–1830, volume 1, Integration on the Mainland. Cambridge University Press. ISBN 978-0-521-80496-7.
- Royal Historical Commission of Burma (1829–1832). Hmannan Yazawin (in Burmese). Vol. 1–3 (2003 ed.). Yangon: Ministry of Information, Myanmar.

Taninganway Min Toungoo Dynasty Born: c. June 1689 Died: 14 November 1733
Regnal titles
Preceded by Sanay	King of Burma; 22 August 1714 – 14 November 1733	Succeeded by Maha Dhamma Yaza Dipadi
Preceded by Sanay	Heir to the Burmese Throne; 1 November 1711 – 22 August 1714	Succeeded by Maha Dhamma Yaza Dipadi
