= Toungoo dynasty =

Imperial dynasty of Burma (1510–1752)

Toungoo dynasty တောင်ငူမင်းဆက် taungnguumainn saat
- 1510–1752
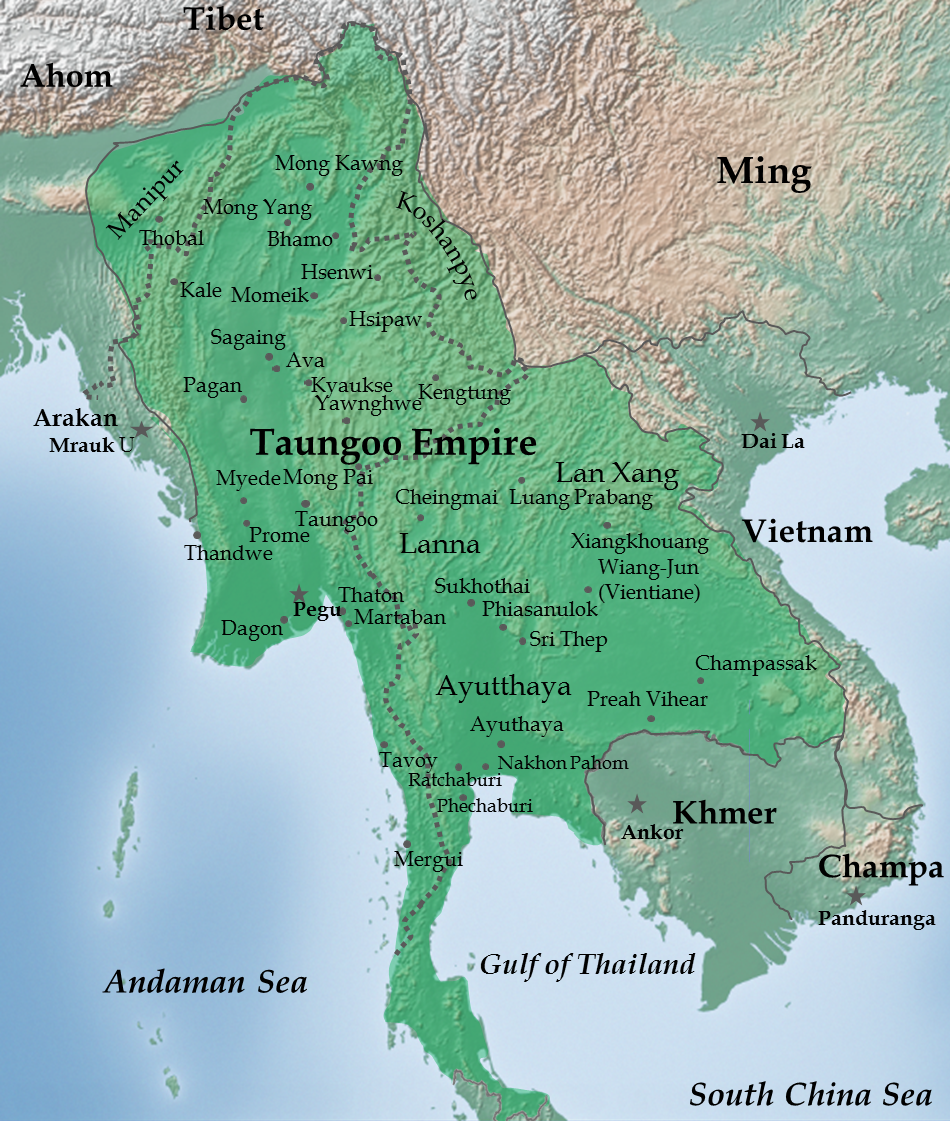
- Toungoo Dynasty at its greatest extent (1580)

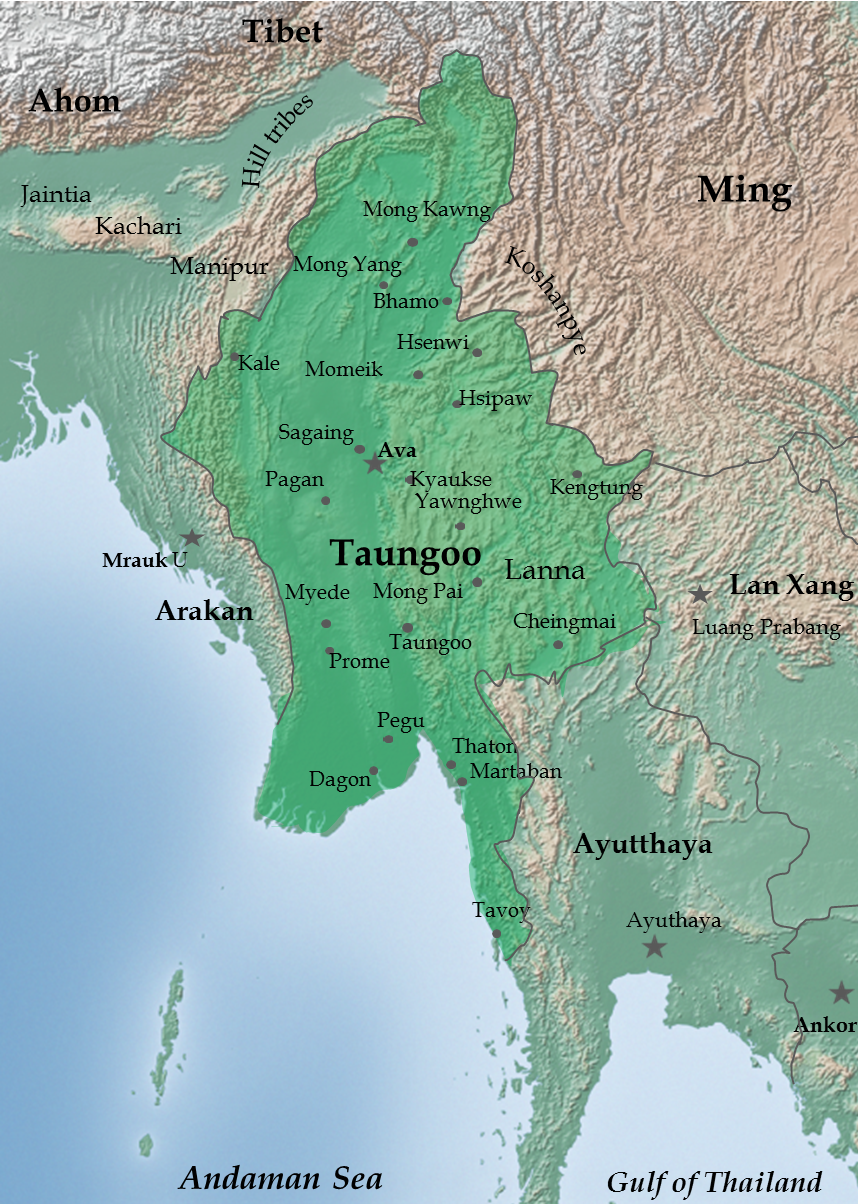
- The restored Taungoo or Nyaungyan Dynasty c. 1650
- Status: Empire/Kingdom
- Capital: Toungoo (Taungoo) (1510–1539); Pegu (Bago) (1539–1599); Ava (Inwa) (1599–1613); Pegu (Bago) (1613–1635); Ava (Inwa) (1635–1752)
- Common languages: Official; Burmese Regional: Thai, Pak Tai (Ayutthaya); Mon (Lower Burma); Malay (Malay Peninsula); Shan (Shan states); Lanna (Lan Na); Lao (Lan Xang); Meithei (Manipur)
- Religion: Official; Theravada Buddhism Minority: Animism; Christianity; Hinduism; Islam
- Government: Absolute monarchy
  - 1485–1530: Mingyi Nyo
  - 1530–1550: Tabinshwehti
  - 1550–1581: Bayinnaung
  - 1599- 1605: Nyaungyan Min
  - 1605–1628: Anaukpetlun
  - 1733–1752: Mahadhammaraza Dipadi
- Legislature: None
- History
  - Toungoo dynasty founded: 1485
  - Independence from Ava Kingdom: 16 October 1510
  - Expansion of Bayinnaung: 1510–1599
  - Nyaungyan Restoration: 1599–1752
  - Hanthawaddy conquest: 23 March 1752

Population
  - Census: 1,982,000 - 2,313,000
- Currency: Silver
Preceded by
Kingdom of Ava
Hanthawaddy Kingdom
Confederation of Shan States
Lan Na Kingdom
Ayutthaya Kingdom
Lan Xang
Manipur (kingdom)
Succeeded by
Restored Hanthawaddy Kingdom
Konbaung dynasty
Ayutthaya Kingdom
- Today part of: Myanmar; Thailand; India; Laos; China; Malaysia; Vietnam

The Toungoo dynasty (Burmese: တောင်ငူမင်းဆက်, [tàʊɰ̃ŋù mɪ́ɰ̃ zɛʔ]), also spelt Taungoo dynasty and also known as the Nyaungyan dynasty (ညောင်ရမ်းမင်းဆက်) after 1599, was the ruling dynasty of Burma (Myanmar) from the mid-16th century to 1752. It is also called the Second Burmese Empire (ဒုတိယမြန်မာနိုင်ငံတော်) in Burmese historiography. At its peak, Toungoo "exercised suzerainty from present-day Assam, Manipur to the Cambodian marches and from the borders of Arakan to Yunnan" and was "probably the largest empire in the history of Southeast Asia." The dynasty ruled in two periods: the First Toungoo Empire (1510–1599) and the Nyaungyan Restoration (1599–1752).

Its early kings Tabinshwehti and Bayinnaung succeeded in reunifying the territories of the Pagan Kingdom for the first time since 1287 and in incorporating the Shan States for the first time, in addition to including Manipur, Chinese Shan States, Siam and Lan Xang. The empire collapsed in the 18 years following Bayinnaung's death in 1581. The dynasty quickly regrouped under the leadership of Nyaungyan Min and his son, Anaukpetlun, who succeeded in restoring a smaller, more manageable kingdom, encompassing Lower Burma, Upper Burma, Shan States and Lan Na by 1622. The Restored Toungoo kings, now based in Ava (Inwa), created a legal and political system whose basic features would continue under the Konbaung dynasty well into the 19th century. The crown completely replaced the hereditary chieftainships with appointed governorships in the entire Irrawaddy valley and greatly reduced the hereditary rights of Shan chiefs. Its trade and secular administrative reforms built a prosperous economy for more than 80 years.

The kingdom entered a gradual decline due to the "palace rule" of its kings. Starting from the 1720s, the kingdom was beset with raids by the Meitei people of the Chindwin River, and a rebellion in Chiang Mai. Raids by the Meitei intensified in the 1730s, reaching increasingly deeper parts of central Burma. In 1740, the Mon people in Lower Burma began a rebellion, founding the Restored Hanthawaddy Kingdom. The Hanthawaddy armies captured Inwa in 1752 and ended the 266-year-old Toungoo dynasty.

== History ==
King Mingyi Nyo founded the First Toungoo Empire (1510–1599) at Taungoo far up the Sittaung River south of Inwa towards the end of the Ava Kingdom in 1510. After the conquest of Inwa by the Mohnyin-led Shan sawbwas in 1527, many Burmese-speakers migrated to Taungoo, which became a new centre.

Mingyi Nyo's son, King Tabinshwehti, unified most of Burma, consolidating his power and pushing southward, over-running the Irrawaddy Delta and crushing the Hanthawaddy capital of Bago. In 1544, Tabinshwehti was crowned as king of all Burma at the ancient capital of Bagan. By that time, the geopolitical situation in Southeast Asia had changed dramatically. The Shan gained power in a new kingdom in the north, the Ayutthaya Kingdom had established itself as a suzerain power around the Chao Phraya river basin, while the Portuguese Empire had arrived in the south and conquered Malacca.

With the coming of European traders, Burma was once again an important trading centre, and Tabinshwehti moved his capital to Bago due to its strategic position for commerce. He then began assembling an army for an attack on coastal Rakhine State to the west. Tabinshwehti's forces were defeated at Arakan but he was able to gain control of Lower Burma up to Pyay. He led his retreating army eastward to the Ayutthaya Kingdom, where he was again defeated in the Burmese–Siamese War (1547–49). A period of unrest and rebellions among other conquered peoples followed and Tabinshwehti was assassinated in 1550.

=== Bayinnaung's Empire ===
Tabinshwehti's brother-in-law, Bayinnaung, succeeded to the throne in 1550 and reigned 30 years, launching a campaign of conquest invading several states, including Manipur (1560) and Ayutthaya (1564). An energetic leader and effective military commander, he made Taungoo the most powerful state in Southeast Asia and extended his borders from Laos to Ayutthaya. Bayinnaung was poised to deliver a final, decisive assault on the western kingdom of Arakan when he died in 1581. His son Nanda Bayin and his successors were forced to quell rebellions in other parts of the kingdom, and the conquest of Arakan was never achieved.

=== Restored Taungoo ===
Faced with rebellion by several cities and renewed Portuguese incursions, the Taungoo rulers withdrew from southern Burma and founded a second dynasty at Ava, the Nyaungyan or Restored Taungoo Dynasty (1597–1752). Bayinnaung's grandson, Anaukpetlun (1605–1628), once again reunited Burma in 1613 and decisively defeated Portuguese attempts to take over Burma. Anaukpetlun's successor Thalun (1629–1648) rebuilt the war torn country. Based on Thalun's revenue inquest in 1635, the Irrawaddy valley's population was estimated to be around 2 million.

The dynasty survived for another century and a half until the death of Mahadhammayaza in 1752. Encouraged by the French in India, Bago finally rebelled against Inwa, further weakening the state, which fell in 1752. The downfall of the Taungoo dynasty has been more broadly ascribed to institutional weaknesses in the capital, which intensified factionalism and succession disputes, and the uneven impact of growing trade and potential price inflation, on the elite's income streams.

== Family tree ==
Mingyi Swe; V. of Toungoo; ~1490s–1549 r.1540–1549	Yaza Dewi; ~1500-? Queen	Mingyi Nyo; 1459–1530 r. 1510–1530	Yadana Dewi; 1490s-? Central Palace; Queen	Soe Min; Hteik-Tin; ~1460s-~1530s Chief queen
Dhamma Dewi; ~1514/15-1580s Chief queen	Tabinshwehti; 1516–1550 r. 1530–1550	Khay Ma Naw; Chief queen	Atula Thiri; ~1518–1568; Chief queen	Bayinnaung; 1516–1581 r. 1550–1581	Khin Pyezon; ~1530s-? Queen	Shin; Htwe Myat	Sanda Dewi; 1517/18–1580s? Chief queen
Hanthawaddy; Mibaya; ~1536–1606; Chief queen	Nanda; 1535–1600 r. 1581–1599	Nyaungyan; 1555–1605 r. 1599–1605	Khin Hpone; Myint; ~1560-1610s Chief queen
Atula; Sanda Dewi; Chief queen	Anaukpetlun; 1578–1628 r. 1605–1628	Khin; Myo Myat
Min Lat	Mingala Dewi	Thalun; 1584–1648 r. 1629–1648	Khin Myo Sit	Khin; Myat Hset	Minye; Deibba; 1608–1629 r. 1628–1629	Khin; Hnin Paw of Kengtung; Chief queen
Ne Myo; Ye Kyaw	Khin Ma; Min Sit	Atula Sanda; Dewi; Chief queen	Pindale; 1608–1661 r. 1648–1661	Min Phyu; Chief queen	Pye; 1619–1672 r. 1661–1672	Khin Ma Lat
Atula; Thiri; Chief queen	Minye; Kyawhtin; 1651–1698 r. 1673–1698	Sanda Dewi	Narawara; 1650–1673 r. 1672–1673
Sanay; 1673–1714 r. 1698–1714	Maha Dewi; Chief queen
Taninganway; 1689–1733 r. 1714–1733	Mingala Dewi; Chief queen
Maha Dhamma; Yaza; 1714–1754 r. 1733–1752	Nanda; Dipadi; Chief queen

== Governance ==
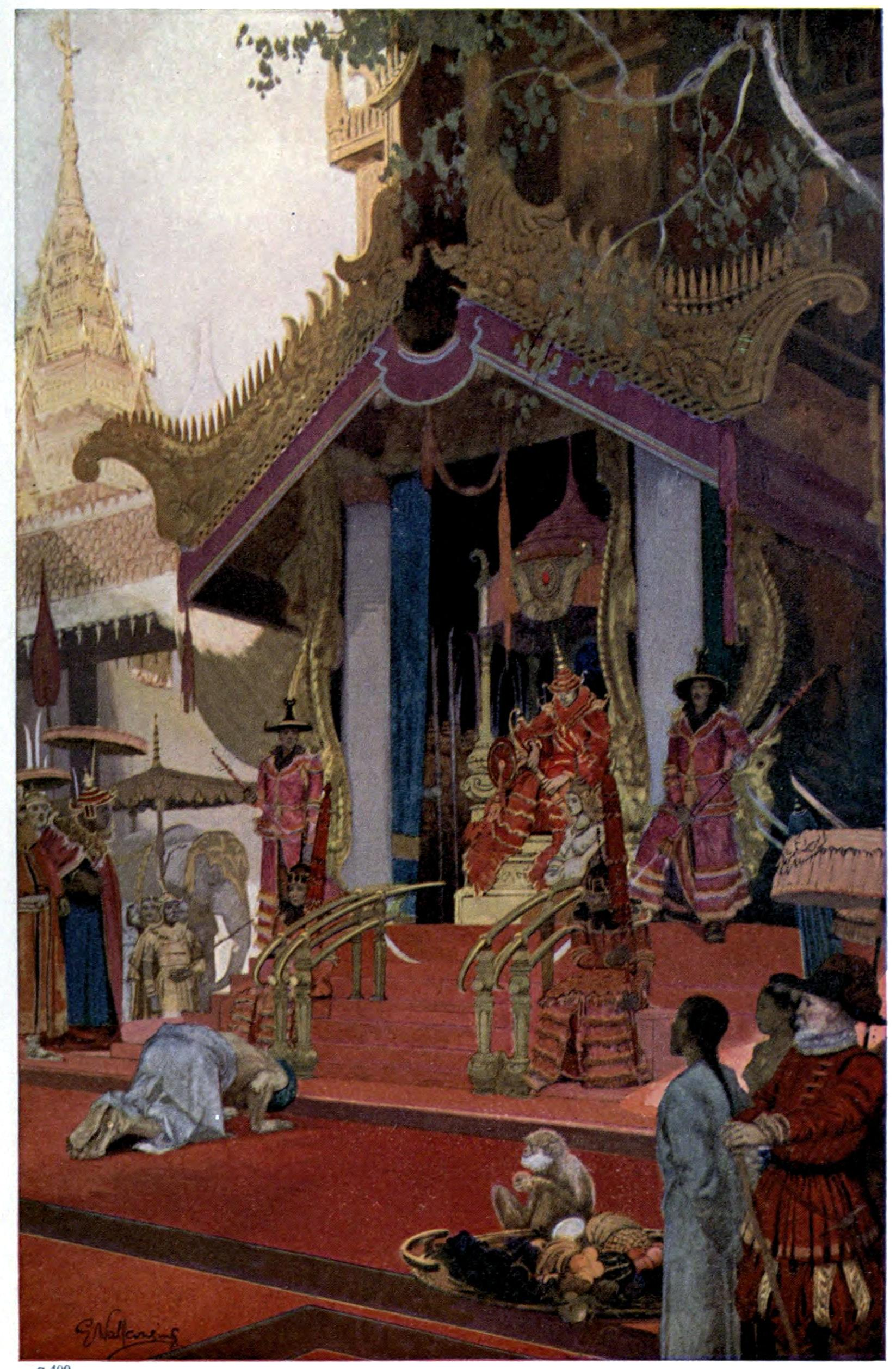
The King of Toungoo in Pegu receives an envoy (17th century)

During the Toungoo dynasty, the Burmese crown undertook a series of reforms that strengthened the stability and relative longevity of the dynasty. While the First Toungoo Empire had established the precedent of stitching together independent kingdoms under a single monarch, Restored Toungoo monarchs more successfully subordinated lowland principalities under the Burmese throne's direct control. Senior princes of these principalities were required to live at the Burmese capital under close supervision, and the ceremonial insignia of these provincial rulers was downgraded. Other reforms included direct central control of provincial deputies, more effective links with provincial village chiefs, and expansion of the ahmudan system around the capital. Beginning in 1635, the Burmese crown began to conduct comprehensive censuses, and consolidated access to provincial manpower and tax collections. The Burmese monkhood in Upper Burma was also subject to more effective personnel and financial regulations.

== Bibliography ==
- Victor B. Lieberman, "Burmese Administrative Cycles: Anarchy and Conquest, c. 1580–1760", Princeton University Press, 1984.
- Lieberman, Victor (2003). Strange Parallels: Volume 1, Integration on the Mainland: Southeast Asia in Global Context, c.800–1830. Cambridge University Press. ISBN 978-1-139-43762-2.
