= Minkhaung Medaw =

Minkhaung Medaw မင်းခေါင် မယ်တော်

Queen Consort of Mrauk U
- Tenure: by 1540 – 1554
- Predecessor: Saw Min Hla
- Successor: Saw Mi Latt

Queen Consort of Hanthawaddy
- Tenure: by 1535–1539
- Predecessor: unknown
- Successor: unknown
- Born: c. late 1510s Prome (Pyay); Prome Kingdom
- Died: c. 1560s Mrauk U Kingdom of Mrauk U
- Spouse: Taka Yut Pi (by 1535–1539); Min Bin (by 1540–1554)
- Issue: ကွန်းဗ္လဲ Kaungbalay (daughter) was born from King Taka Yut Pi
- House: Prome
- Father: Bayin Htwe
- Mother: Chit Mi
- Religion: Theravada Buddhism

Minkhaung Medaw (Burmese: မင်းခေါင် မယ်တော်, pronounced [mɪ́ɴɡàʊɴ mɛ̀dɔ̀]) was a principal queen of King Taka Yut Pi of Hanthawaddy (Ramanya) from c. 1535 to 1539, and of King Min Bin of Mrauk U (Arakan) from c. 1540 to 1554. A daughter of King Bayin Htwe of Prome, the queen is also referred to as Pegu Mibaya and Tanzaung Mibaya in the royal chronicles.

== Brief ==
=== Early life ===
The future queen was born to Prince Htwe of Prome (Pyay) and his second wife Chit Mi c. late 1510s. She was descended from a long line of rulers of Prome from both sides, and ultimately from King Narapati I of Ava (r. 1442–1468) from both sides. She was a granddaughter of then King of Prome, Thado Minsaw. (Note: See (Hmannan Vol. 2 2003: 82–84) and (Hmannan Vol. 3 2003: 80, 88) for her father's ancestry. See (Hmannan Vol. 3 2003: 80, 82–84) for her mother's ancestry.) The princess had three full siblings—an elder brother Minye Sithu (later known as King Minkhaung of Prome), a younger sister later known as Vicereine Laygyun Mibaya of Toungoo, and a younger brother who died young; and four half-siblings, including King Narapati of Prome and Vicereine Narapati Medaw of Prome. Her personal name is unknown; Minkhaung Medaw was a title (literally, "Minkhaung's Royal Younger Sister"). (Note: She must have received the title in or after 1539 when her elder brother Minye Sithu ascended the throne with the title of Minkhaung per (Hmannan Vol. 2 2003: 215))

The princess likely grew up in Prome since her father succeeded in becoming king in 1526. In the 1530s and 1540s, the princess became involved in two marriages of state, courtesy of her two brothers. (Note: (Yazawin Thit Vol. 1 2012: 330) and (Hmannan Vol. 2 2003: 195–196): Her half-brother Narapati, two years after his accession, sent her to Pegu in a marriage to King Taka Yut Pi in 1534/35. And her brother Minkhaung sent her to Mrauk-U to wed King Min Bin c. 1540.)

=== Queen of Hanthawaddy Pegu (Ramanya) ===
Circa 1535, her half brother Narapati, who had succeeded their father as king since 1532, married her off to King Taka Yut Pi of Hanthawaddy Pegu. (Note: (Yazawin Thit Vol. 1 2012: 330): Two years after his accession in 894 ME (1532/33), Narapati sent the elder daughter of Queen Chit Mi to marry Taka Yut Pi.) Narapati also married Taka Yut Pi's sister. The marriages were intended to cement the burgeoning alliance between Prome and Pegu. The two kingdoms had been in a low grade conflict with the upstart kingdom of Toungoo over Tharrawaddy, the southernmost district of Prome, since 1531. Her marriage to Taka Yut Pi came as the conflict had escalated to a full blown war between Toungoo and Pegu. The marriage was one of the three state marriage alliances executed by Narapati. The king of Prome, who was a vassal of Ava, also sent his full sister Narapati Medaw to marry Gov. Sithu Kyawhtin of Salin (a powerful governor and ally of Ava) to further cement the relationship with Ava, and his other half sister, Laygyun Mibaya, to marry King Tabinshwehti of Toungoo with the hope of avoiding an all out war with Toungoo.

If Narapati's marriage alliances kept Prome out of Toungoo's immediate wrath, Minkhaung Medaw's new home, Pegu (Bago), came under repeated Toungoo attacks for the next three years. In late 1538, Taka Yut Pi decided to evacuate Pegu, and the royal family of Pegu retreated to Prome. Because of her stint at Pegu, she is referred to as Pegu Mibaya (ပဲခူး မိဖုရား, [bəgó mḭbəjá]; "Queen of Pegu"). However, soon after their arrival at Prome, her husband and her brother Narapati, king of Prome, both died, one after another.

=== Queen of Mrauk U (Arakan) ===
She would not remain a widow for long. Prome was now at war with Toungoo, and the new king of Prome Minkhaung, her elder brother, sent her off to marry King Min Bin of Mrauk U in another marriage alliance c. 1540. (Note: Various chronicle accounts exist. (Hmannan Vol. 2 2003: 195–196): The chronicle Maha Yazawin says it was Narapati that sent her to Mrauk U but Yazawin Thit says it was Minkhaung that sent her to Mrauk U. Hmannan Yazawin says Yazawin Thit's account agrees with the queen's own extant writings. Furthermore, the main Burmese chronicles say that she was sent to Mrauk U as part of a marriage alliance between Prome and Mrauk U soon after Minkhaung became king. Per (Hmannan Vol. 2 2003: 195), Mrauk U entered into an alliance with Prome and Prome's overlord Ava before Toungoo decided to attack Martaban in November 1540. It means the marriage between Minkhaung Medaw and Min Bin most likely had taken place by 1540. However, the Arakanese chronicle (Rakhine Razawin Thit Vol. 2 1999: 33) says that Minkhaung Medaw was presented to King Min Bin in 1547 by King Tabinshwehti to end the Toungoo–Mrauk-U War (1545–47).) At Mrauk U, she became known as Tanzaung Mibaya (တန်ဆောင်း မိဖုရား, [dəzáʊ̯ɴ mḭbəjá]; "Queen of the Royal Hall"). (Note: Tanzaung Mibaya was likely a title of a second ranked queen consort, based on the queens who held the same title under other kings. (RRT Vol. 2 1999: 46): Queen Saw Thanda, with the title of Tanzaung Mibaya, was the second ranked queen of King Min Saw Hla. (RRT Vol. 2 1999: 87): Tanzaung Mibaya was also likely the second ranked queen consort of King Raza II.)

== Ancestry ==
The following is the queen's ancestry. (Note: The main royal chronicles (Maha Yazawin Vol. 3 2006: 89), (Yazawin Thit Vol. 1 2012: 329) and (Hmannan Yazawin Vol. 3 2003: 88) all say that Minkhaung Medaw's mother was Queen Shwe Zin Gon, and that the princess died either in her 20th year (at age 19; Maha Yazawin and Hmannan) or in her 15th year (at age 14; Yazawin Thit). But the reporting is most likely a mixup. Her title Minkhaung Medaw ("Minkhaung's Royal Younger Sister") indicates that she was likely to have been the full sister of Minkhaung, whose mother, according to all main chronicles, was Queen Chit Mi. Indeed, (Yazawin Thit Vol. 1 2012: 329) does say that it was the second daughter of Queen Chit Mi and Bayin Htwe that became a queen consort of King Taka Yut Pi of Pegu. Furthermore, the Arakanese chronicle Rakhine Razawin Thit (RRT Vol. 2 1999: 33) identifies the queen who became King Min Bin's Tanzaung Mibaya as Queen Minkhaung Medaw, who according to the main Burmese chronicles was already dead in her teenage years.)

Ancestry of Queen Minkhaung Medaw

8. Narapati I of Ava
4. Thado Minsaw of Prome
9. Atula Thiri Maha Yaza Dewi of Ava
2. Bayin Htwe
10. Saw Shwe Khet of Prome
5. Myat Hpone Pyo
11. Saw Min Phyu of Ava
1. Minkhaung Medaw
12. Minye Kyawswa I of Kalay
6. Minye Kyawswa II of Kalay
13. unnamed
3. Chit Mi of Prome
14. Mingyi Swa of Prome
7. Min Hpone Htut of Prome
15. Saw Myat Lay

== Bibliography ==
- Kala, U (2006) [1724]. Maha Yazawin (in Burmese). Vol. 1–3 (4th printing ed.). Yangon: Ya-Pyei Publishing.
- Maha Sithu (2012) [1798]. Kyaw Win; Thein Hlaing (eds.). Yazawin Thit (in Burmese). Vol. 1–3 (2nd ed.). Yangon: Ya-Pyei Publishing.
- Royal Historical Commission of Burma (2003) [1832]. Hmannan Yazawin (in Burmese). Vol. 1–3. Yangon: Ministry of Information, Myanmar.
- Sandamala Linkara, Ashin (1997–1999) [1931]. Rakhine Razawin Thit (in Burmese). Vol. 1–2. Yangon: Tetlan Sarpay.

Minkhaung Medaw Prome Born: c. 1510s
Royal titles
Unknown	Queen consort of Arakan by 1540 – 1554	Unknown
Unknown	Queen consort of Hanthawaddy by 1535 – 1539	Unknown
