= Salin Mibaya =

Salin Mibaya စလင်း မိဖုရား

Chief vicereine of Prome
- Tenure: 30 August 1551 – November/December 1588
- Predecessor: unknown
- Born: 1520s Prome (Pyay)
- Died: Prome (Pyay)
- Spouse: Min Ba Saw; Narapati IV of Ava; Thado Dhamma Yaza II of Prome
- Issue: Hsinbyushin Medaw; Min Taya Medaw
- House: Prome
- Father: Bayin Htwe
- Mother: Shwe Zin Gon
- Religion: Theravada Buddhism

Salin Mibaya (Burmese: စလင်း မိဖုရား, pronounced [səlɪ́ɴ mḭbəjá]; also known as Narapati Medaw, (နရပတိ မယ်တော်)) was the chief queen of Viceroy Thado Dhamma Yaza II of Prome (r. 1551–1588).

The second daughter of King Bayin Htwe of Prome and his chief queen Shwe Zin Gon was married three times. Her marriage to her first cousin Min Ba Saw—a son of her maternal uncle—was cut short when her brother King Narapati had him executed. Narapati then married her off to Sithu Kyawhtin, then governor of Salin, a powerful figure in the Confederation of Shan States, in a marriage of state in the late 1530s. (Prome was then a de facto vassal state of the Confederation, which controlled all of Ava territories except Toungoo in Upper Burma.) Her stay at Salin lasted until January 1544 when the city was captured by Toungoo forces under Gen. Bayinnaung. Her husband escaped to Ava (Inwa) but she was captured and sent to Pegu (Bago). In 1545, she was married to Nanda Yawda, a younger brother of Bayinnaung, at the coronation ceremony of Tabinshwehti at the Pegu Palace.

She returned to her native Prome as queen in 1551 when her husband was appointed viceroy of the region by King Bayinnaung. She had two daughters by Nanda Yawda, now styled as Thado Dhamma Yaza II. Their elder daughter Hsinbyushin Medaw became the chief queen of Nawrahta Minsaw, the viceroy (and later king) of Lan Na. The younger daughter Min Taya Medaw was a major queen of Nanda.

== Ancestry ==
The following is her ancestry as reported in the Hmannan Yazawin chronicle, which in turn referenced contemporary inscriptions. (Note: See (Hmannan Vol. 3 2003: 88) for the names of her maternal grandparents. See (Hmannan Vol. 2 2003: 82–84) for further ancestors.) Her parents were double cousins.

Ancestry of Salin Mibaya

8. (=12) Narapati I of Ava
4. Thado Minsaw of Prome
9. (=13) Atula Thiri Maha Yaza Dewi of Ava
2. Bayin Htwe
10. (=14) Saw Shwe Khet
5. Myat Hpone Pyo
11. (=15) Saw Min Phyu
1. Narapati Medaw
12. (=8) Narapati I of Ava
6. Mingyi Swa of Prome
13. (=9) Atula Thiri Maha Yaza Dewi of Ava
3. Shwe Zin Gon
14. (=10) Saw Shwe Khet
7. Saw Myat Lay
15. (=11) Saw Min Phyu

== Bibliography ==
- Kala, U (1724). Maha Yazawin (in Burmese). Vol. 1–3 (2006, 4th printing ed.). Yangon: Ya-Pyei Publishing.
- Ni Ni Myint (2004). Selected Writings of Ni Ni Myint. Yangon: Myanmar Historical Commission.

Salin Mibaya Toungoo Dynasty Born: 1520s
Royal titles
| Unknown | Chief vicereine of Prome; 1551–1588 | Succeeded by |
