= Hsinbyushin Medaw =

Hsinbyushin Medaw ဆင်ဖြူရှင် မယ်တော်

Chief queen consort of Lan Na
- Tenure: 28 January 1579 – 1601/02
- Coronation: 2 July 1579
- Born: in or before 1552/53 (Note: Chronicles do not mention her birth date. But her younger sister Min Taya Medaw was already born by 915 ME (1553/54) per (Minye Deibba 1967: 6).) in or before 914 ME; Prome (Pyay); Toungoo Empire
- Died: 1601/02; 963 ME; Chiang Mai; Lan Na
- Spouse: Nawrahta Minsaw
- Issue: Yodaya Mibaya; Thado Minsaw of Lan Na (Tu Laung); Minye Deibba of Lan Na; Thado Kyaw
- House: Toungoo
- Father: Thado Dhamma Yaza II
- Mother: Salin Mibaya
- Religion: Theravada Buddhism

Hsinbyushin Medaw (Burmese: ဆင်ဖြူရှင် မယ်တော်, pronounced [sʰɪ̀ɴ pʰjù ʃɪ̀ɴ mɛ̀dɔ̀]; also known as Hsinbyushin Me, lit. "Lady of the White Elephant"; c. 1550s–1601/02) was the chief queen of King Nawrahta Minsaw of Lan Na from 1579 to 1601/02. She was the mother of three rulers of Lan Na: Thado Minsaw of Lan Na (Tu Laung), Minye Deibba of Lan Na and Thado Kyaw. She was an accomplished poet, known for her yadu poems, which are among the earliest records of Lan Na in Burmese literature.

== Early life ==
Hsinbyushin Medaw was the elder daughter of Thado Dhamma Yaza II, Viceroy of Prome, and his chief queen Salin Mibaya. She was probably born c. 1552. From her mother's side, she was descended from Ava and Prome royal lines; from her father's side, she was a niece of King Bayinnaung. She had one full younger sister Min Taya Medaw and eight half-siblings.

Ancestry of Hsinbyushin Medaw

8. Taungkha Min
4. Mingyi Swe
9. Kayenawaddy
2. Thado Dhamma Yaza II of Prome
10. Kywe Sit Min
5. Shin Myo Myat
11. (unnamed)
1. Hsinbyushin Medaw
12. Thado Minsaw of Prome
6. Bayin Htwe of Prome
13. Myat Hpone Pyo
3. Salin Mibaya
14. Mingyi Swa of Prome
7. Shwe Zin Gon
15. Saw Myat Lay

For much of her childhood, her father, who was one of the four principal commanders of the king, was often away on military campaigns. She was educated at the Prome Palace. One of her tutors was a famous and accomplished poet Nawaday, originally of the Ava court. She learned from the "great master" various forms of Burmese poetry, including the yadu style for which she would be remembered.

== Princess of Tharrawaddy ==
The princess was married to her first cousin Min Tha Sit, a senior prince and son of King Bayinnaung, at the Kanbawzathadi Palace in Pegu (Bago) by the king himself on 27 February 1574. She moved to Tharrawaddy, a town about 150 km south of Prome, where her husband was governor. She found a kindred spirit in Mintha Sit, who also loved literature and poetry. But Sit was also an ambitious prince who led a campaign to northern Shan states of Mohnyin and Mogaung in 1576–1577. It was the first of many campaigns that Sit would be away from her, and their long separations would come to be used as an inspiration for her poetry.

She gave birth to her first child, a daughter, on 8 May 1578. (Note: Hmannan (Hmannan Vol. 3 2003: 178) cites a Nawaday eigyin about the daughter, which states that she was born in the evening of Thursday, 4th waxing of Nayon 940 ME. But 4th waxing of Nayon 940 ME translates to Saturday, 10 May 1578. If she was a Thursday born--most Burmese care more about the day of the week in which they were born, and are unlikely to be mistaken about it--her birth date was probably 2nd waxing of Nayon 940 ME.)

== Queen of Lan Na ==
On 28 January 1579, Mintha Sit was appointed as King of Lan Na with the title of Nawrahta Minsaw by the High King. With the appointment, Hsinbyushin Medaw, who was pregnant with their second child, (Note: Maha Yazawin (Maha Yazawin Vol. 3 2006: 152) says the daughter was the youngest. But Hmannan Yazawin (Hmannan Vol. 3 2003: 177) says she was the eldest child.) became the chief queen consort of Lan Na. En route to Chiang Mai, she gave birth to a boy whom the couple named Tu Laung (တုလောင်း) after the place of birth, Mt. Doi Luang. They ascended to the Chiang Mai throne on 2 July 1579.

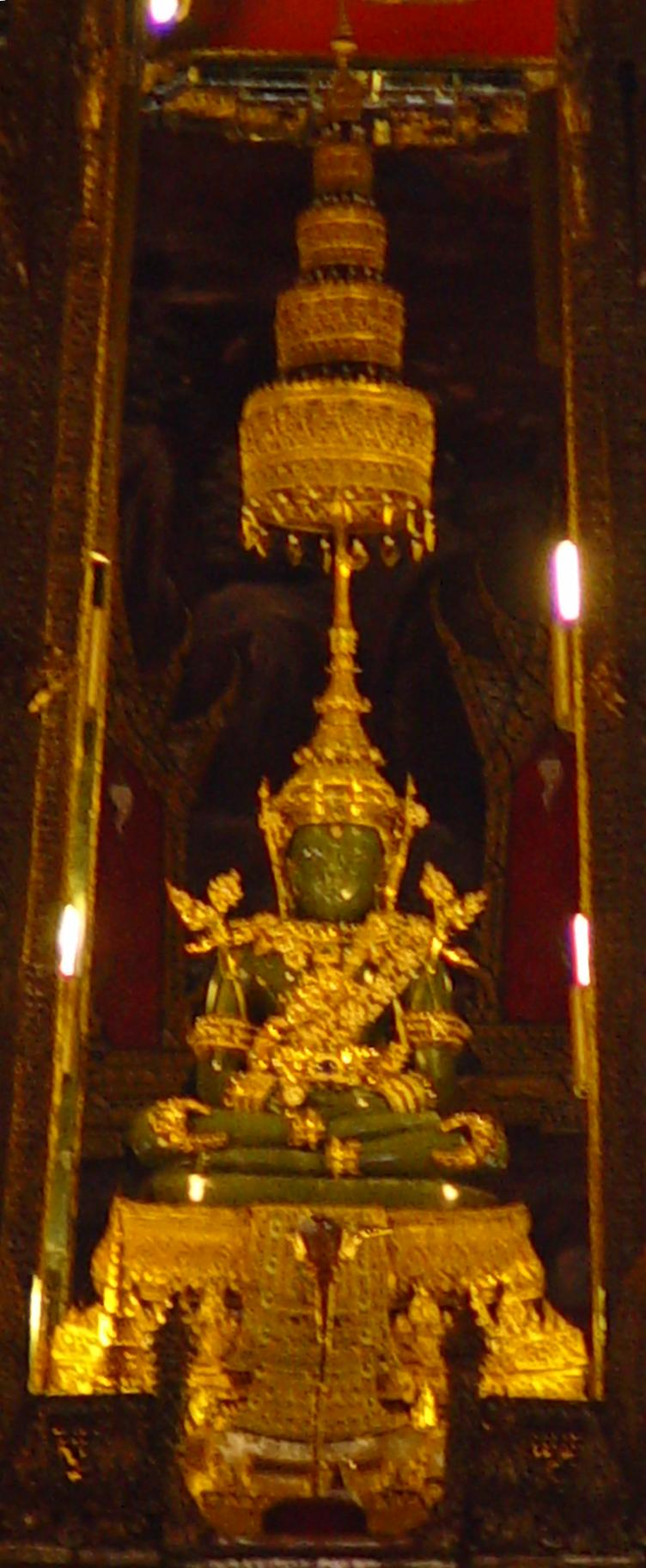
The Emerald Buddha now at Wat Phra Kaew in Bangkok

The queen would spend the rest of her life in Lan Na. The royal couple had two more children there. She composed many poems, which are among the earliest extant Burmese language records about life in Lan Na. According to her poems, she went on pilgrimages to the famous Buddhist shrines of Lan Na, in particular Phra Kaew (which at the time housed the Emerald Buddha), Phra Singh, and Phra Suthep. She also used her pilgrimages as opportunities to see the Lan Na countryside, and to be outside the walled city of Chiang Mai. Her husband, who also enjoyed writing poetry, wrote a famous yadu poem, dedicated to his beloved queen.

To be sure, the Burmese royals' reign of the Tai Yuan-speaking kingdom was not all filled with tranquility. In 1584, both Ava and Siam revolted, setting into motion the eventual fall of Toungoo Empire. After King Nanda's failed campaigns in Siam (1584–1593), the political stability of Lan Na itself rapidly deteriorated, with eastern provinces breaking away from Chiang Mai. Since Nanda could not provide any help, Nawrahta Minsaw declared himself independent in 1596/97. In the following years, he was always on campaigns in the eastern provinces. It is unclear if he was by her side when she died in Chiang Mai c. 1601/02 (963 ME). (According to the Ayutthaya Chronicle, she died while Nawrahta Minsaw prepared to submit to King Naresuan of Siam.)

== Literary records ==
The chronicle Zinme Yazawin contains some of her more famous yadu poems. According to the historian Ni Ni Myint, yadu is "a poetic form in which three stanzas are linked by the rhyming of their last lines, the yadu had its golden age in the 16th and early 17th century. The poem generally evokes a mood of wistful sadness through the contemplation of nature in the changing seasons or the yearning for a loved one temporarily separated."

The following is a translation by Ni Ni Myint of one of the queen's famous poems called "Victory Land of Golden Yun". (Note: (Ni Ni Myint 2004: 16): Yun was the Burmese name for the people of Lan Na, and derived from Tai Yuan.) The queen composed the poem while her husband was away on campaign in Yunnan in 1582–1583.

Victory Land of Golden Yun, Our Home
Thronged pleasantly like paradise
The clear waters moving without cease
The forests teeming with singing birds
The breezes replace the sere leaves

As buds peep and petals spread
ingyin, yinma, thawka, tharaphi
gangaw, swedaw, fragrant hpetsut
anan, thazin, gamon, balmy in bloom
Luxuriantly scenting the air in the early summer…

Yet my love is not here to enjoy
I in loneliness watch the delights
In this season of diverse scents
In Yun City, created by you, lord
And await your return

Topmost of the royal lineage of the sun
Brilliant like the flame of the sun
Ever-triumphant conqueror of the foes
My husband marches boldly to far-off China and Lan Xang
To clear the enveloping enemies…

Sadly I nurse my loneliness
Clear the enemy before Tagu!
All enemies bow to Chiang Mai City
Encircled by cool waters and wall-like hills
Unequalled Lord of Golden Yun…

My topmost lineage of the sun
Now that the south wind blows, the sere leaf falls
The golden laburnum flutters, liquid emerald
I do not know how to wear
Fragrant flowers in my top-hair

Since my lion-hearted husband marched to war
I guard my mind and kneeling
Before Buddha’s images
Of Phra Kaew, Phra Singh, golden Maha Chedi
And the famous Phra Suthep

Images bright as sun
On western hill-top beyond the city, and within
With reverence I say my prayers
Rising glory of the lineage of the sun

== Bibliography ==
- Fernquest, Jon (Spring 2005). "The Flight of Lao War Captives from Burma back to Laos in 1596: A Comparison of Historical Sources" (PDF). SOAS Bulletin of Burma Research. 3 (1). ISSN 1479-8484. Archived from the original (PDF) on 2022-01-18.
- Harvey, G. E. (1925). History of Burma: From the Earliest Times to 10 March 1824. London: Frank Cass & Co. Ltd.
- Kala, U (1724). Maha Yazawin (in Burmese). Vol. 1–3 (2006, 4th printing ed.). Yangon: Ya-Pyei Publishing.
- Ni Ni Myint (2004). Selected Writings of Ni Ni Myint. Yangon: Myanmar Historical Commission.
- Royal Historical Commission of Burma (1832). Hmannan Yazawin (in Burmese). Vol. 1–3 (2003 ed.). Yangon: Ministry of Information, Myanmar.
- Than Kho, Shin (1615). Minye Deibba Egyin (in Burmese) (1967 ed.). Yangon: Hanthawaddy Press.

Hsinbyushin Medaw Toungoo Dynasty Born: c. 1552 Died: 1601/02
Royal titles
Preceded by	Chief queen consort of Lan Na; 28 January 1579 – 1601/02	Succeeded by
