= Narapati of Prome =

Narapati of Prome နရပတိ (ပြည်)

King of Prome
- Reign: c. December 1532 – February 1539
- Predecessor: Bayin Htwe
- Successor: Minkhaung
- Died: c. February 1539; Prome (Pyay)
- Spouse: Thiri Hpone Thut daughter of Narapati II of Ava
- House: Mohnyin
- Father: Bayin Htwe
- Mother: Shwe Zin Gon
- Religion: Theravada Buddhism

Narapati of Prome (Burmese: နရပတိ (ပြည်), pronounced [nəɹa̰pətḭ]; died February 1539) was king of Prome from 1532 to 1539. He seized the throne after his father Bayin Htwe was taken captive by the Confederation of Shan States in 1532 back to Upper Burma. Bayin Htwe escaped after the Confederation's leader Sawlon was assassinated by his ministers, and returned to Prome (Pyay), c. May 1533. But Narapati shut the gates against his father, who soon died in the adjoining forests.

Narapati remained a nominal vassal to Confederation controlled Ava. Although his authority did not extend beyond the immediate region around Prome, he became ensnarled in the Toungoo–Hanthawaddy War (1534–41). Narapati was an ally of King Takayutpi of Hanthawaddy, and was married to Takayutpi's sister. Narapati provided shelter to the fleeing Hanthawaddy troops in 1538–39. When Toungoo troops attacked a heavily fortified Prome, Narapati asked for help from the Confederation in Ava. The Confederation troops broke the siege, but refused to follow up on the retreating Toungoo armies.

Narapati formed an alliance with Mrauk U Kingdom of Arakan by sending his sister and his queen (Takayutpi's sister) to King Min Bin of Mrauk U. (Takayutpi had died soon after the battle.) Narapati too died soon after. He was succeeded by his half-brother Minkhaung.

== Ancestry ==
The following is his ancestry as reported in the Hmannan Yazawin chronicle, which in turn referenced contemporary inscriptions. (Note: See (Hmannan Vol. 3 2003: 88) for the names of his maternal grandparents. See (Hmannan Vol. 2 2003: 82–84) for further ancestors.) His parents were double cousins.

Ancestry of Narapati of Prome

8. (=12) Narapati I of Ava
4. Thado Minsaw of Prome
9. (=13) Atula Thiri Maha Yaza Dewi of Ava
2. Bayin Htwe
10. (=14) Saw Shwe Khet
5. Myat Hpone Pyo
11. (=15) Saw Min Phyu
1. Narapati
12. (=8) Narapati I of Ava
6. Mingyi Swa of Prome
13. (=9) Atula Thiri Maha Yaza Dewi of Ava
3. Shwe Zin Gon
14. (=10) Saw Shwe Khet
7. Saw Myat Lay
15. (=11) Saw Min Phyu

== Bibliography ==
- Kala, U (2006) [1724]. Maha Yazawin (in Burmese). Vol. 1–3 (4th printing ed.). Yangon: Ya-Pyei Publishing.
- Phayre, Lt. Gen. Sir Arthur P. (1967) [1883]. History of Burma. London: Susil Gupta.
- Royal Historical Commission of Burma (2003) [1832]. Hmannan Yazawin (in Burmese). Vol. 1–3. Yangon: Ministry of Information, Myanmar.

Narapati of Prome Prome Kingdom Died: c. February 1539
Regnal titles
Preceded by Bayin Htwe	King of Prome; December 1532 – February 1539	Succeeded by Minkhaung
