= Minkhaung of Prome =

Minkhaung of Prome ပြည် မင်းခေါင်

King of Prome
- Reign: February 1539 – 19 May 1542
- Predecessor: Narapati
- Successor: Thado Dhamma Yaza I
- Born: c. 1510s Prome (Pyay)
- Died: April 1553; Pegu (Bago)
- Consort: Thiri Hpone Htut
Names
- Minye Sithu
- House: Mohnyin
- Father: Bayin Htwe
- Mother: Chit Mi of Prome
- Religion: Theravada Buddhism

Minkhaung of Prome (Burmese: ပြည် မင်းခေါင် [mɪ́ɰ̃ɡàʊɰ̃]; died 1553) Tai name Sao Möng Hkam was the last king of Prome, the descendant from Mohnyin who reigned three tumultuous years from 1539 to 1542. He succeeded his brother Narapati in 1539. Minkhaung frantically prepared to defend against another attack by Toungoo Kingdom. He reinforced his already heavily fortified city of Prome (Pyay), and hired foreign mercenaries. Although he knew his nominal overlords, the Confederation of Shan States, would assist him, he continued the alliance with King Min Bin of Mrauk U begun by his late brother. Min Bin was married to Minkhaung's and Narapati's sister.

In late 1541, Toungoo again laid siege to Prome. Prome's allies the Confederation and Mrauk U sent in help to break the siege. But Toungoo forces under the command of Gen. Bayinnaung defeated both armies. Mrauk U also sent in a naval flotilla that landed in Bassein (Pathein). Upon hearing of the Mrauk U army's defeat, the flotilla turned back. After a five months' siege, starvation set in. The besieged deserted the city in great numbers. On 19 May 1542 (5th waxing of Nayon 904 ME), Minkhaung surrendered. Minkhaung and his queen Thiri Hpone Htut were taken to Toungoo (Taungoo).

King Tabinshwehti of Toungoo appointed Mingyi Swe, Bayinnaung's father, governor of Prome, restoring its former position of a provincial capital.

Minkhaung remained under house arrest until 1553 when he died by natural illness. Thiri Hpone Htut became a queen of Bayinnaung with the title of Sanda Dewi.

== Ancestry ==
The following is his ancestry as reported in the Hmannan Yazawin chronicle, which in turn referenced contemporary inscriptions. (Note: See (Hmannan Vol. 3 2003: 80) for the names of his maternal grandparents. See (Hmannan Vol. 2 2003: 82–84) for further ancestors.)

Ancestry of King Minkhaung

8. Narapati of Ava
4. Thado Minsaw of Prome
9. Atula Thiri Maha Yaza Dewi of Ava
2. Bayin Htwe
10. Saw Shwe Khet of Prome
5. Myat Hpone Pyo
11. Saw Min Phyu of Ava
1. Minkhaung Minye Sithu
12. Minye Kyawswa I of Kalay
6. Minye Kyawswa II of Kalay
13. unnamed
3. Chit Mi of Prome
14. Mingyi Swa of Prome
7. Min Hpone Htut of Prome
15. Saw Myat Lay

== Bibliography ==
- Kala, U (2006) [1724]. Maha Yazawin (in Burmese). Vol. 1–3 (4th printing ed.). Yangon: Ya-Pyei Publishing.
- Harvey, G. E. (1925). History of Burma: From the Earliest Times to 10 March 1824. London: Frank Cass & Co. Ltd.
- Royal Historical Commission of Burma (2003) [1832]. Hmannan Yazawin (in Burmese). Vol. 1–3. Yangon: Ministry of Information, Myanmar.

Minkhaung of Prome Prome Kingdom Born: c. 1510s Died: 1553
Regnal titles
Preceded by Narapati	King of Prome; February 1539 – 19 May 1542	Succeeded by Thado Dhamma Yaza I as Viceroy
