= Shwe Zin Gon =

Shwe Zin Gon; ရွှေစင်ကုံး

Chief queen consort of Prome
- Tenure: February 1527 – late 1532
- Predecessor: Saw Myat Lay
- Successor: Thiri Hpone Htut
- Born: c. 1470s: Prome (Pyay); Ava Kingdom
- Died: Unknown; Prome?
- Spouse: Bayin Htwe
- Issue: Narapati of Prome; Mingyi Saw; unnamed daughter; Narapati Medaw
- House: Mohnyin
- Father: Mingyi Swa of Prome
- Mother: Saw Myat Lay
- Religion: Theravada Buddhism

Shwe Zin Gon (Burmese: ရွှေစင်ကုံး [ʃwè zɪ̀ɴ ɡóʊɴ]; also known as Min Shwe Gon) was the chief queen of King Bayin Htwe of Prome (r. 1527–1532). She was of Ava royalty, and a daughter of Mingyi Swa, viceroy of Prome (r. 1446–1482). In 1482, her paternal uncle Thado Minsaw took over Prome, and declared himself king. Thado Minsaw raised her mother Saw Myat Lay to chief queen. Shwe Zin Gon herself was later married to her first cousin Bayin Htwe, the eldest son of Thado Minsaw. Her eldest son Narapati was king of Prome from 1532 to 1539.

== Ancestry ==
She was the youngest of the 11 children of Viceroy Mingyi Swa of Prome and Saw Myat Lay. The following is her ancestry as reported in the Hmannan Yazawin chronicle, which in turn referenced contemporary inscriptions. (Note: See (Hmannan Vol. 3 2003: 88) for her parents. See (Hmannan Vol. 2 2003: 82–84) for her further ancestors.) Her parents were first cousins.

Ancestry of Queen Shwe Zin Gon

8. Mohnyin Thado
4. Narapati I of Ava
9. Shin Mi Myat
2. Mingyi Swa of Prome
10. (=12) Thinkhaya of Pagan
5. Atula Thiri Maha Yaza Dewi of Ava
11. (=13) Saw Min Pu
1. Shwe Zin Gon
12. (=10) Thinkhaya of Pagan
6. Saw Shwe Khet of Prome
13. (=11) Saw Min Pu
3. Saw Myat Lay
14. Minye Kyawswa
7. Saw Min Phyu
15. Saw Min Hla

== Bibliography ==
- Kala, U (2006) [1724]. Maha Yazawin (in Burmese). Vol. 1–3 (4th printing ed.). Yangon: Ya-Pyei Publishing.
- Royal Historical Commission of Burma (2003) [1832]. Hmannan Yazawin (in Burmese). Vol. 1–3. Yangon: Ministry of Information, Myanmar.

Shwe Zin Gon Prome Kingdom Born: c. 1470s
Royal titles
Preceded by Saw Myat Lay	Queen consort of Prome; 1526–1532	Succeeded by Thiri Hpone Htut
