= Bayin Htwe =

Thiri Thudhamma Yaza Bayin Htwe သီရိသုဓမ္မရာဇာ ဘုရင်ထွေး

King of Prome
- Reign: February 1527 – late 1532
- Predecessor: Thado Minsaw
- Successor: Narapati
- Born: c. 1470s Tharrawaddy (Thayawadi); Ava Kingdom
- Died: c. June 1533 outside Prome (Pyay); Prome Kingdom
- Consort: Shwe Zin Gon; Chit Mi
- Issue among others...: Narapati; Minkhaung; Minkhaung Medaw; Narapati Medaw; Laygyun Mibaya
Names
- Thiri Thudhamma Yaza
- House: Mohnyin
- Father: Thado Minsaw
- Mother: Myat Hpone Pyo
- Religion: Theravada Buddhism

Bayin Htwe (Burmese: ဘုရင်ထွေး, pronounced [bəjɪ̀ɰ̃ tʰwé]; c. 1470s–1533) Tai name Hso Yam Hpa (သိူဝ်ယႅမ်ႉၾႃႉ) was king of Prome (Pyay) from 1527 to 1532. His small kingdom, founded by his father Thado Minsaw in 1482, was conquered by the Confederation of Shan States in 1532, and he was taken prisoner to Upper Burma. He was later released, and returned to Prome only to be refused entry by his son Narapati. Bayin Htwe died at the outskirts of Prome (Pyay) in mid 1533.

== Brief ==
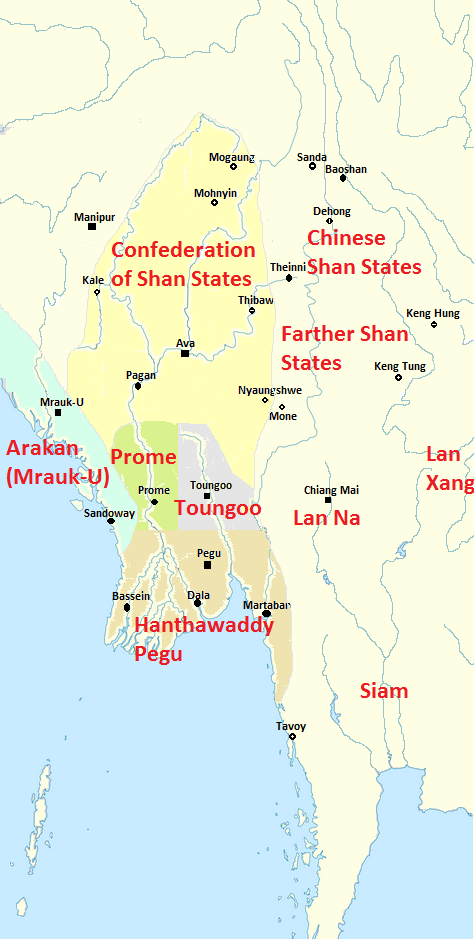
Political Map of Burma (Myanmar) in 1530

Bayin Htwe was a son of Thado Minsaw who proclaimed independence of his minor kingdom from Ava in 1482. Htwe ascended the throne in 1526 after his father's death. His formal title was Thiri Thudhamma Yaza (သီရိသုဓမ္မရာဇာ). The new king soon incurred the wrath of Saw Lon, the leader of Confederation of Shan States because he did not send help in the Confederation's war against Ava in 1526–1527. His father had been an ally of Lon, and sent troops in their 1524–1525 assault on Ava. In 1532, Lon and his Confederation armies (12,000 troops, 800 horses and 30 elephants) laid siege to Prome. Htwe surrendered in late 1532, and was sent to Dabayin in Upper Burma in exile. Htwe's son Narapati was appointed vassal king.

Htwe's life in captivity was cut short after Lon was assassinated by his own ministers near Myedu, enabling his return to Prome. He arrived back at the outskirts of Prome, five months after he lost his throne. But Narapati did not allow him back in the city. He died about a month later in the adjoining forests.

== Family ==
His legacy lived on through his offspring. Two of his sons, Narapati and Minkhaung, became rulers of Prome, albeit as vassals of Ava. Two of his daughters, Salin Mibaya and Laygyun Mibaya, respectively were married to Viceroy Thado Dhamma Yaza II of Prome and Viceroy Minkhaung II of Toungoo. Another daughter, Minkhaung Medaw was married to King Taka Yut Pi of Hanthawaddy, and later to King Min Bin of Arakan. He was the maternal grandfather of Queen Hsinbyushin Medaw of Lan Na and Queen Min Taya Medaw, a principal queen of King Nanda of Toungoo Dynasty.

Queen	Rank	Issue	Reference
Shwe Zin Gon	Chief queen	Narapati, King of Prome (r. 1532–1539); Mingyi Saw (d. aged 19) daughter (d. aged 14 or 19); Narapati Medaw, Vicereine of Prome (r. 1551–1588)	(Note: The issue list generally follows the lists provided in the main Burmese chronicles Maha Yazawin, Yazawin Thit and Hmannan Yazawin except for Minkhaung Medaw, whose mother is reported in the chronicles as Shwe Zin Gon. (Maha Yazawin Vol. 3 2006: 89), (Yazawin Thit Vol. 1 2012: 329) and (Hmannan Yazawin Vol. 3 2003: 88) all say that the third daughter by Queen Shwe Zin Gon was named Minkhaung Medaw, who died at either in her 20th year (at age 19; Maha and Hmannan) or in her 15th year (age 14; Yazawin Thit). (Maha Yazawin Vol. 3 2006: 83) says that Queen Chit Mi and Bayin Htwe had issue: Minkhaung, a daughter who died young, Laygyun Mibaya and a son; (Yazawin Thit Vol. 1 2012: 329) says the couple had Minkhaung, daughter married to Taka Yut Pi, Laygyun Mibaya and a son who died young; (Hmannan Vol. 3 2003: 80) gives Minkhaung, Laygyun Mibaya, a daughter who died young, and a son. However, the chronicles' reporting of Queen Minkhaung Medaw as the full sister of King Narapati is most probably a mix-up. First, the Arakanese chronicle Rakhaine Razawin Thit (RRT Vol. 2 1999: 33) identifies the queen who became King Min Bin's Tanzaung Mibaya as Queen Minkhaung Medaw, who according to the main Burmese chronicles was already dead in her teenage years. Furthermore, the title Minkhaung Medaw (lit. "Minkhaung's younger sister") indicates that she was more likely Minkhaung's full sister than Narapati's.)
Chit Mi	Principal queen	Minkhaung, King of Prome (r. 1539–1542); Minkhaung Medaw, Queen of Hanthawaddy (r. 1534/35–1539) and Queen of Arakan (r. 1540–1554); Laygyun Mibaya, Vicereine of Toungoo (r. 1549–1584) son (died young)	

== Ancestry ==
The following is his ancestry as reported in the Hmannan Yazawin chronicle, which in turn referenced contemporary inscriptions. (Note: See (Hmannan Vol. 2 2003: 82–84) and (Hmannan Vol. 3 2003: 80, 88) for his ancestors.) His parents were first cousins.

Ancestry of King Bayin Htwe

8. Mohnyin Thado
4. Narapati of Ava
9. Shin Myat Hla of Ava
2. Thado Minsaw of Prome
10. (=12) Thinkhaya of Pagan
5. Atula Thiri Maha Yaza Dewi of Ava
11. (=13) Saw Min Pu of Pagan
1. Htwe
12. (=10) Thinkhaya of Pagan
6. Saw Shwe Khet of Prome
13. (=11) Saw Min Pu of Pagan
3. Myat Hpone Pyo
14. Minye Kyawswa
7. Saw Min Phyu
15. Saw Min Hla

== Bibliography ==
- Kala, U (2006) [1724]. Maha Yazawin (in Burmese). Vol. 1–3 (4th printing ed.). Yangon: Ya-Pyei Publishing.
- Maha Sithu (2012) [1798]. Kyaw Win; Thein Hlaing (eds.). Yazawin Thit (in Burmese). Vol. 1–3 (2nd printing ed.). Yangon: Ya-Pyei Publishing.
- Phayre, Lt. Gen. Sir Arthur P. (1967) [1883]. History of Burma. London: Susil Gupta.
- Royal Historical Commission of Burma (2003) [1832]. Hmannan Yazawin (in Burmese). Vol. 1–3. Yangon: Ministry of Information, Myanmar.
- Sandamala Linkara, Ashin (1997–1999) [1931]. Rakhine Razawin Thit (in Burmese). Vol. 1–2. Yangon: Tetlan Sarpay.

Bayin Htwe Prome Kingdom Born: c. 1470s Died: c. June 1533
Regnal titles
Preceded by Thado Minsaw	King of Prome; 1527–1532	Succeeded by Narapati as vassal of Mohnyin
