= Mingyi Swa (disambiguation) =

Mingyi Swa was a Burmese royal title, and may mean:

- Swa Saw Ke, King of Ava (r. 1367–1400)
- Mingyi Swa of Prome, Viceroy of Prome (r. 1446–82)
- Mingyi Swa, Heir-apparent of Burma (r. 1581–93)
