= Nawrahta Minsaw =

King of Lan Na

Nawrahta Minsaw နော်ရထာ မင်းစော
- Chaopha Sawatthinaratthamangkhoi

King of Lan Na
- Reign: 28 January 1579 – 1607/08
- Coronation: 2 July 1579
- Predecessor: Wisutthi Thewi
- Successor: Thado Minsaw (Tu Laung) and Minye Deibba
- Emperor: Bayinnaung (1579–1581); Nanda Bayin (1581–c. 1597); Naresuan (c. 1602–1605); Ekathotsarot (1605–1607/08)
- Born: 1551/52; 913 ME; Toungoo; Toungoo Empire
- Died: late 1607/early 1608; 969 ME; Chiang Mai; Lan Na
- Spouse: Hsinbyushin Medaw
- Issue among others: Five sons and six daughters, including: Yodaya Mibaya; Thado Minsaw; Minye Deibba; Thado Kyaw
Names
- Anawrahta Minsaw Min Tha Sit
- House: Toungoo
- Father: Bayinnaung
- Mother: Yaza Dewi
- Religion: Theravada Buddhism

Nawrahta Minsaw (Burmese: နော်ရထာ မင်းစော, pronounced [nɔ̀jətʰà mɪ́ɴ sɔ́]; formally, Anawrahta Minsaw; also known as Nawrahta Saw and Tharrawaddy Min; 1551/52–1607/08) known in Lan Na as Sawatthinaratthamangkhoi (Northern Thai: ᨧᩮᩢ᩶ᩣᨼ᩶ᩣᩈᩣᩅᨲ᩠ᨳᩦᨶᩁᨳᩣᨾᩢ᩠ᨦᨣᩬ᩠ᨿ) was king of Lan Na from 1579 to 1607/08 and the first Burmese-born vassal king of Lan Na. He was also an accomplished poet.

Appointed to the Lan Na throne by his father King Bayinnaung of Burma, Nawrahta dutifully contributed to his half-brother King Nanda's debilitating war effort against Siam (1584–95). He declared independence in 1597 after having defeated a 1595–96 invasion by Lan Xang on his own. From 1599 onward, he was forced to deal with a Lan Xang backed rebellion in Nan and a Siam-backed rebellion in Chiang Rai and Chiang Saen. He defeated the Chiang Rai rebellion in 1601–02 but was eventually forced to submit to Siam soon after. He defeated an invasion by Lan Xang in 1602–03, regaining Nan in the process.

== Early life ==
The future ruler of Lan Na was born Min Tha Sit (မင်းသားစစ်, [mɪ́ɴ ðá sɪʔ] or [mɪ́ɴ θá sɪʔ]) in 1551/52. His parents were King Bayinnaung of Toungoo and Htwe Hla, then a minor queen. His mother was descended from the Ava royal line, and was a niece of King Narapati II (r. 1501–1527) of Ava. He had two younger full siblings: Yaza Datu Kalaya and Thiri Thudhamma Yaza. The three children grew up at the Kanbawzathadi Palace in Pegu, and they officially became part of the most senior royalty in March 1563 when their mother was elevated to the king's third (and last) principal queen with the style of Yaza Dewi.

Educated at the palace, the prince grew to love literature and poetry. He was married to his first cousin Hsinbyushin Medaw, daughter of his uncle Thado Dhamma Yaza II of Prome, by Bayinnaung himself on 27 February 1574. Sit found a kindred spirit in his bride, who also loved literature and poetry and had studied poetry under the great poet Nawaday. The couple moved to Tharrawaddy (Thayawadi), a small town in present-day Bago Region, where Sit had been made governor.

== Governor of Tharrawaddy ==
Now known as Tharrawaddy Min (သာယာဝတီမင်း, [θàjàwədì mɪ́ɴ]; "Lord of Tharrawaddy"), the prince made his mark in a 1576–1577 military campaign that would push him to the forefront of the most powerful princes at the Pegu court. On 26 November 1576, (Note: Maha Yazawin (Maha Yazawin Vol. 3 2006: 59) gives Saturday, 5th waxing of Nadaw 938 ME, which translates to Monday, 26 November 1576. Hmannan Yazawin (Hmannan Vol. 3 2003: 40) drops the Saturday but retains 5th waxing of Nadaw 938 ME.) the prince received a seemingly futile assignment to lead a search operation of a fugitive chief of Mogaung in the northern Kachin Hills. (Note: The track record of Toungoo armies searching for a small band of rebels in remote hill regions was extremely poor. See futile search operations that decimated the ranks of the searchers in: (1) Lan Xang (1565, 1569–1570) per (Maha Yazawin Vol. 2 2006: 285–292) and (Maha Yazawin Vol. 2 2006: 328–331); Mohnyin and Mogaung (1571–1572) per (Maha Yazawin Vol. 2 2006: 336–338).) For the first eight months, the campaign was on track to be yet another futile operation. His army (16,000 troops, 1300 horses, 130 elephants), made up of conscripts from Upper Burma and Shan States, had fruitlessly combed the remote northern hills at the foot of the Himalayas. But he did not give up even when the rainy season of 1577 came. His persistence paid off. One of his battalions finally caught the top commanders of the fugitive chief, and the captured men gave up the location where the chief was hiding. The prince brought the fugitive chief before the king on 30 September 1577. (Note: (Maha Yazawin Vol. 3 2003: 62) & (Hmannan Vol. 3 2003: 43): Tuesday, 3rd waning of Thadingyut 939 ME, which translates to Monday, 30 September 1577.)

The success of the operation won the young prince plaudits from the king. He was given an upgraded title of Anawrahta Minsaw (အနော်ရထာ မင်းစော). From then on, he would be known by abridged versions of the title: either as Nawrahta Minsaw or Nawrahta Saw. (Note: See (Maha Yazawin Vol. 3 2006: 65–67) for interchanging use of Nawrahta Minsaw and Nawrahta Saw when he was first referred to as such in the chronicles. See the obituary section of King Bayinnaung (Maha Yazawin Vol. 3 2006: 77) for the prince's formal title of Anawrahta Minsaw.)

== King of Lan Na ==
=== Accession and early reign ===
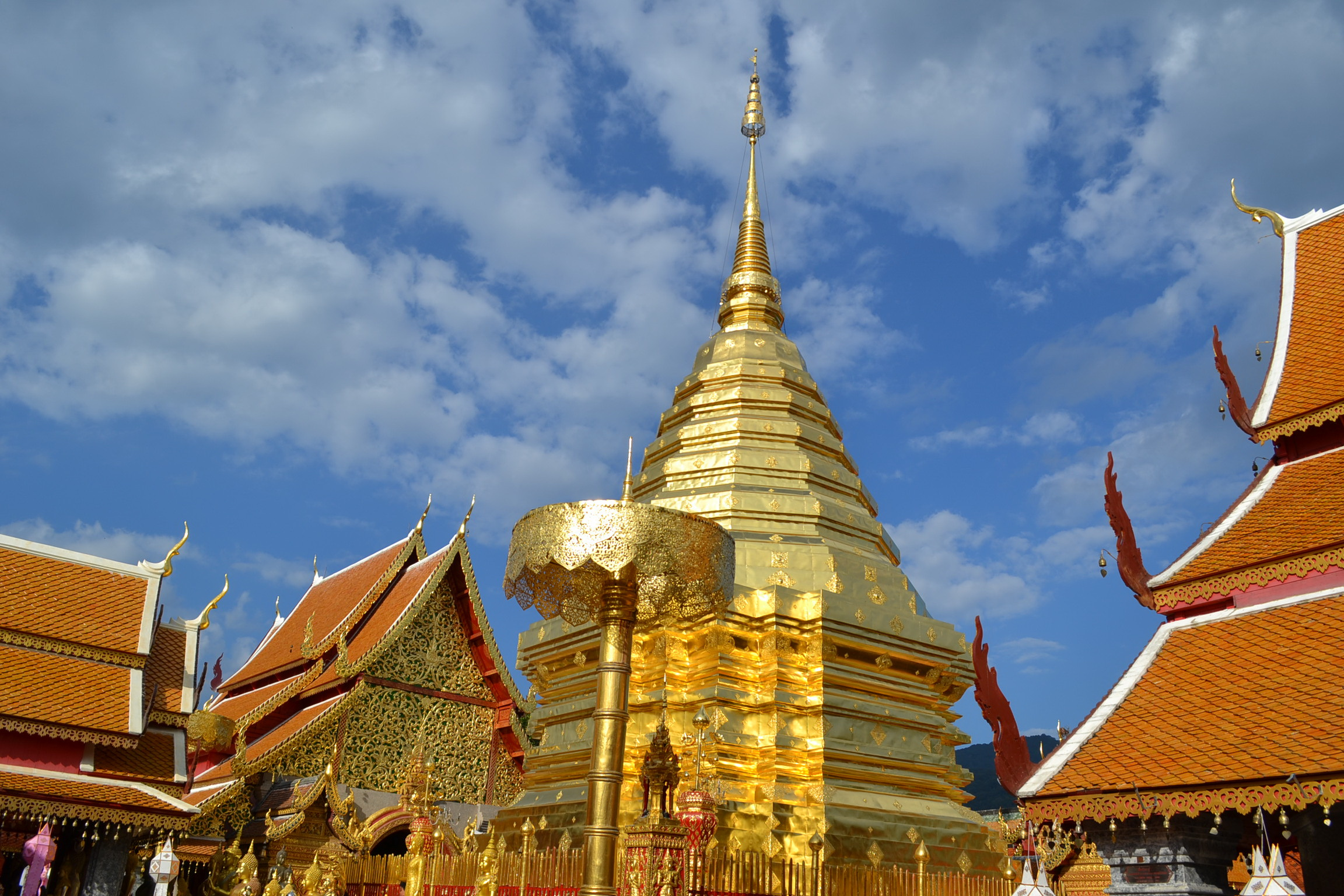
Wat Phra That Doi Suthep, Chiang Mai

His star continued to rise. On 28 January 1579, (Note: Date given as 2nd waxing of Tabaung 940 ME. Hmannan (Hmannan Vol. 3 2003: 48) gives Wednesday, 5th waxing of Tabaung 940 ME but 5th waxing is a typographical error as it translates to Saturday, 31 January 1579. The date is probably 2nd waxing of Tabaung 940 ME (28 January 1579), which was a Wednesday.) he was appointed the next viceroy of Lan Na to succeed Queen Visuddhadevi, who had died a month earlier. The appointment certainly was a significant matter. The king regarded Lan Na as the most important of all his vassal states, and selected Nawrahta from a list of candidates after careful deliberation with his court. The king impressed upon Nawrahta the importance of the appointment, highlighting that Lan Na was larger than Ava, Toungoo, and Prome; that it was strategically located among mainland Burma, the Shan states, Siam, Lan Xang and Annam; that it had a large population and plenty of natural resources; and that he was to obey Nanda, the heir-apparent.

Nawrahta Minsaw and Hsinbyushin Medaw ascended to the Lan Na throne at Chiang Mai on 2 July 1579. Although he was the first Burmese-born ruler on the Chiang Mai throne, he did not face any serious issues governing the Tai Yuan-speaking former sovereign kingdom. The royal couple, at least according to reporting in the chronicle Zinme Yazawin, was accepted by the local populace. (Note: (Ni Ni Myint 2004: 20): According to surviving yadu poems by Hsinbyushin Medaw in Zinme, his chief queen regularly went on pilgrimages to the famous Buddhist shrines of Lan Na, in particular Phra Kaew (which at the time housed the Emerald Buddha), Phra Singh, and Phra Suthep. She also used her pilgrimages as opportunities to see the Lan Na countryside, and to be outside the walled city of Chiang Mai.)

=== Military assistance to Nanda ===
The initial tranquility, however, was to give way to increasingly more turbulent times after King Bayinnaung's death in October 1581. Nawrahta pledged loyalty to the new king. Nawrahta, like other vassal rulers, who governed what used to be sovereign states as recently as only a few decades ago, adopted a "wait-and-see attitude" with Nanda, an experienced military commander in his own right.

==== Sanda (1582–1583) ====
In the following years, he would be repeatedly asked to contribute to Nanda's manic efforts to maintain the extremely overextended empire intact. The first major assignment came in September 1582. Two small northernmost Shan states (in present-day Dehong and Baoshan prefectures in Yunnan, China) never sent obligatory tribute to the new king. Nanda ordered Nawrahta and Thado Dhamma Yaza II to lead a two-pronged invasion. The combined army of 16000 men, 1600 horses, and 100 elephants spent five months at Sanda before finally taking the town. The two commanders brought the rebel chief before the king on 9 April 1583. (Note: (Ni Ni Myint 2004: 16–17): Hsinbyushiin Medaw wrote her most famous yadu poem, called "Victory Land of Golden Yun" while awaiting Nawrahta's return from the Sanda campaign.)

==== Ava (1584) ====
But the calm was temporary. About three months later, Viceroy Thado Minsaw of Ava sent secret embassies to Prome, Toungoo, and Chiang Mai to raise simultaneous rebellions. Nawrahta, like the viceroys of Toungoo and Prome, sided with Nanda and secretly forwarded the news to Nanda. In March 1584, as ordered by Nanda, Nawrahta marched with an army from Lan Na to Ava. But his army did not see any combat as Nanda defeated Thado Minsaw in single combat on 24 April 1584.

==== Siam (1584–1595) ====
The peace was shorter still. Nine days later, on 3 May 1584, Siam revolted. In the next nine years, Nanda would launch five disastrous campaigns against the "proud kingdom" of Siam, which had been preparing for the eventual showdown with Pegu since Bayinnaung's death.

Though he never went on campaign himself, Nawrahta dutifully contributed manpower to the war effort.

Campaign	Duration	# of Lan Na regiments of the total	Total strength of RBA	Notes
1st invasion of Siam	1584	none	11,000	Hastily planned invasion from Lower Burma
2nd invasion	1586	7 out of 19	12,000	Invasion from Lan Na to northern Siam
3rd invasion	1586–1587	4 out of 24	25,000	Two-pronged invasion from Lower Burma and Lan Na
4th invasion	1590–1591	3 out of 19	20,000	Invasion from Lan Na to northern Siam
5th invasion	1592–1593	4 out of 29	24,000	Two-pronged invasion from Lower Burma and Lan Na
1st Siamese invasion of Burma	1594–1595	unspecified	8000	Sent troops to break the Siamese siege of Pegu

The declining share of Lan Na manpower may have been a sign of his increasing disillusionment with the war, and/or his increasing inability to control his own vassal states. At least to 1592–1593, his vassals in Nan, Phrae and Chiang Rai were still loyal to Nawrahta. Indeed, the vassal rulers were the ones who went to the front. (Note: See the commander lists of the five campaigns in (Maha Yazawin Vol. 3 2006: 84–93).) After the 1592–1593 invasion, Nanda's position with the vassal rulers rapidly deteriorated, as did Nawrahta's position with his own vassals. When Nanda asked for help to break the Siamese siege of Pegu in December 1594, Nawrahta faced great difficulty in rounding up the troops. It was only in April 1595 that troops from Toungoo and Lan Na arrived and broke the siege.

=== War with Lan Xang (1595–1596) ===
By then, the once mighty Toungoo Empire was in a free fall. Nokeo Koumane, the ruler of Lan Xang, revolted. The rebellion was more of a problem for Chiang Mai than for Pegu. Whereas Nanda had all but given up defending the empire, Nawrahta had to deal with an aggressive Nokeo who had designs on Lan Na itself. Nokeo quickly gained the allegiance of the ruler of Nan, Cao Cetabut, who joined him in rebellion. In response, Nawrahta marched to Nan, where he was met by combined Lan Xang–Nan forces at the mouth of the Ngao River near the city of Nan. There, on 25 November 1595, Nawrahta defeated the enemy, driving back Cetabut and Nokeo to Lan Xang. Fortunately for Nawrahta, Nokeo died shortly after, and Lan Xang's threat to Lan Na's eastern frontier ended for the time being. Nawrahta appointed Pana Khaek as the new governor of Nan.

== Independent reign ==
Faced with his own problems, Nawrahta finally declared independence from Pegu in early 1597. (Note: Chronicles (Maha Yazawin Vol. 3 2006: 97) only say Minye Thihathu II of Toungoo and Nawrahta of Lan Na revolted in 958 ME (1596/97). But they most likely declared independence in early 1597. Per (Than Tun Vol. 2 1985: 11), Nyaungyan declared that Ava would be his new capital on 19 April 1597 without Nanda permission, effectively declaring independence. Nyaungyan most probably declared it soon after the other two's announcement.) Although he was only one of two rulers formally declaring independence—Minye Thihathu II of Toungoo was the other—all other rulers essentially broke away as well. The Toungoo Empire was no more.

For Nawrahta, being independent simply meant he could devote his scarce manpower toward defending Lan Na from Lan Xang's and Siam's designs. For the next several years, he would struggle mightily to keep Lan Na independent. Here, Lan Na and Lan Xang chronicles (the Chiang Mai Chronicle, the Nan Chronicle, and the Lan Xang Chronicle), and the Siamese Ayutthaya Chronicle give widely divergent accounts. Ayutthaya reports Lan Na being pulled into Siam's orbit while Lan Na and Lan Xang chronicles speak of Lan Xang–Nan alliance's campaigns in Lan Na and barely mention Siam's role.

=== Lan Na and Lan Xang chronicle accounts ===
Like Nokeo, Vorapita, the new Pegu-appointed regent of Lan Xang, also harbored designs on Lan Na. (Vorapita like Nyaungyan in Upper Burma, never formally declared independence from Pegu but was de facto independent by 1597.) By late 1598, Vorapita had decided to renew the hostilities, and sent in an army led by Cetabut, not just to retake Nan but to sack Chiang Mai itself. By January 1599, the army had advanced to Chiang Mai and laid siege to the capital. To make matters worse, "the people of the south attacked Chiang Mai", which could mean Siamese forces invading Lan Na. The Lan Xang army retreated from Chiang Mai on 11 July 1599 but retained control of Nan.

Problems continued to mount for Nawrahta. In 1601/02, (Note: (Fernquest 2005: 52): 963 ME = 9 April 1601 to 8 April 1602) Ram Decho, ruler of Chiang Saen, revolted and his rebellion spread to much of Lan Na. He even attacked Lan Xang's vassal Nan but was driven back. Now, Lan Xang forces went on a major counterattack, taking Ram Decho's territories. Ram Decho is not heard from again in the chronicles. By then, Nawrahta's territory was down to central and northwestern Lan Na (Chiang Mai, Phayao and Fang). In the following dry season, combined Lan Xang–Nan forces attacked Chiang Mai for a final push. But Chiang Mai's defenses once again held, and drove back the invaders. Chiang Mai forces had regained Nan by 16 May 1603. They also caught Cetabut who was executed on 3 June 1603. Four months after the failed invasion, the Vientiane court forced Vorapita to abdicate in favor of his son Voravongsa. The new king did not renew the war.

=== Siamese chronicle account ===
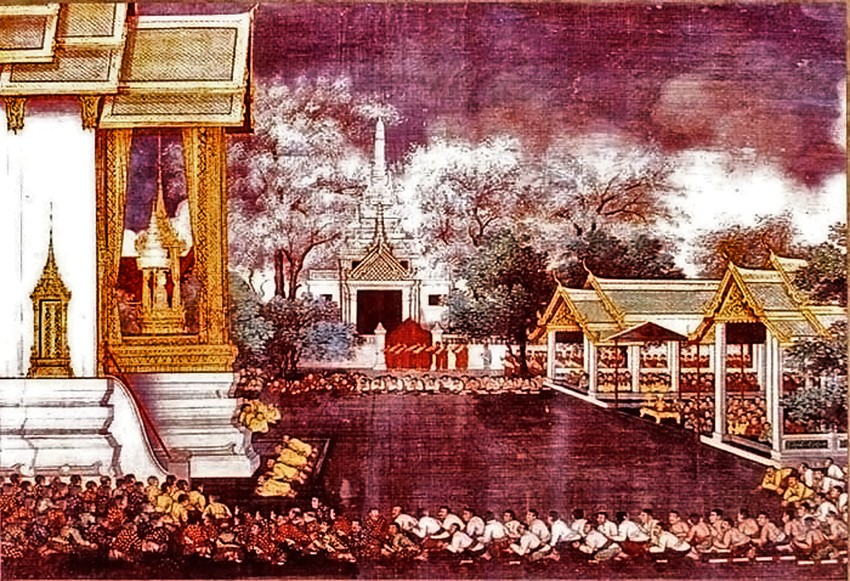
Lanna envoy (under the rule of Nawrahta Minsaw) presenting royal tribute to King Naresuan at Ayutthaya in 1596. Painted by Luang Phitsanukam (Lek) according to the royal decree of king Chulalongkorn in 1887.

The Ayutthaya Chronicle paints a completely different picture. In early 1599, (Note: (Fernquest 2005: 50): The Ayutthaya Chronicle says the army was sent in 960 ME (9 April 1598 to 9 April 1599). The Nan Chronicle (Ratchasomphan 1994: 68) gives a more specific date, that the siege of Chiang Mai began in January 1599.) Nawrahta was under siege by Lan Xang–Nan forces, and requested military help from Siam. King Naresuan sent an army led by Prince Surasi. The Siamese army marched past Chiang Mai to Chiang Rai and Chiang Saen where they installed Ram Decho, a Chiang Mai native, as the ruler there. Ram Decho emerged as the main rival to Nawrahta.

For the next three years, Nawrahta tried desperately and ultimately unsuccessfully to stay out of Ayutthaya's increasing grip on Lan Na. When Naresuan asked Nawrahta to contribute manpower to the Siamese king's 1600 invasion of Lower Burma, Nawrahta sent his eldest son Thado Minsaw (Tu Laung) instead of joining the campaign himself. Perhaps encouraged by Naresuan's failed invasion, Nawrahta attacked Siamese-backed ruler of Chiang Saen and Chiang Rai Ram Decho c. 1601/02, (Note: (Fernquest 2005: 52): The Ayutthaya Chronicle does not explicitly say when Ekathotsarot's expedition took place but it appeared to have been after 962 ME (9 April 1600 to 8 April 1601).) In response, Naresuan sent his brother Ekathotsarot to Lan Na to sort things out there.

Nawrahta drove out Ram Decho from Chiang Rai. Upon his return to Chiang Mai, he heard that Ekathotsarot was waiting at Lamphun, immediately south of Chiang Mai, receiving submissions by the vassal rulers of Chiang Mai, including the ruler of Nan. Nawrahta held out for a long time, wavering back and forth. He sent Tu Laung to submit but then called him back after his chief queen died. Meanwhile, Siamese officials were running out of patience, and advised their king at Ayutthaya to abandon Nawrahta and leave him to his own devices against Lan Xang and minor states of Lan Na. Naresuan ordered another mission to persuade Nawrahta, and it was successful. Nawrahta finally traveled to Lamphun and submitted. For his part, Ekathotsarot ordered all the vassal rulers of Lan Na to obey Nawrahta as the rightful king of Lan Na.

=== Burmese chronicle account ===
The main Burmese chronicles Maha Yazawin and Hmannan Yazawin both agree with Ayutthaya's account that Lan Na was a vassal of Siam. The Burmese chronicles say that in the dry season of 1604–1605, Naresuan was in Lan Na, preparing to invade the Shan states. Moreover, the chronicles mention that Nawrahta's eldest daughter was married to the Siamese king, and that the eldest son Tu Laung, heir-apparent of Lan Na, was married to a Siamese princess and lived in Ayutthaya. These were hallmarks of what vassal rulers of the era would have done. Furthermore, the chronicles indicate that Naresuan's successor Ekathotsarot continued to be the overlord of Lan Na at least to Nawrahta's death in 1607/08 when Ekathotsarot unsuccessfully tried to place his nominee Tu Laung on the throne.

=== Summary ===
Although various chronicle accounts differ greatly and have many contradictions among them, (Note: (Fernquest 2005: 47): The prevailing Thai history narrative, as reconstructed and interpreted by Prince Damrong, follows Ayutthaya's version only.) they all agree that Nawrahta's independent reign of Lan Na was at peace for at most two years between 1597 and 1599. From 1599 onward, he had to deal with two major foreign-backed rebellions in Nan (by Lan Xang) and in Chiang Rai/Chiang Saen (by Siam). He twice survived Lan Xang's sieges of Chiang Mai (1599 and 1602–1603). Despite his best efforts to stay independent, according to Siamese and Burmese chronicles, he became a vassal of Siam. Ayutthaya does not give an actual date as to when the submission took place—only that it happened some time after 1600/01. Given that according to Chiang Mai, Siam-backed Chiang Rai was still in active rebellion in 1601/02, Ekathotsarot's expedition likely took place around the same time, probably in the dry season of 1601–1602. Nawrahta avoided submission as long as he could but eventually gave in, probably c. 1602. This submission may have triggered Lan Xang's 1602–1603 invasion.

== Last years ==
By late 1603, Nawrahta had regained control of all of Lan Na, albeit as a vassal of Siam. Its eastern flank was now quiet as the new regime in Vientiane abandoned Lan Xang's designs on Lan Na. But just as one threat ended, a new potential threat arrived in the north. In November 1603, Nyaungyan, one of Nawrahta's many half brothers, invaded Mone, the Shan state immediately north of Lan Na, and had acquired the major Shan state and its tributary nearby minor states by March 1604. Siam viewed this as a direct threat to Lan Na. Naresuan and the Siamese army arrived at Lan Na in the dry season of 1604–1605. But the invasion never took place as the Siamese king fell ill and died in April 1605.

Nawrahta seemed to have paid tribute to Naresuan's successor Ekathotsarot. The feared invasion from Burma did not come. In all, Lan Na during his last years from May 1603 onward seemed to have been relatively peaceful even if the specter of war was ever present.

Nawrahta Minsaw died in late 1607/early 1608, having ruled for 28 years. (Note: The Chiang Mai Chronicle (Wyatt 1998: 125) says he died in 969 ME (10 April 1607 to 8 April 1608). Since he ascended to the Lan Na throne on 3 July 1579, he likely died after June 1607. Chiang Mai also says that his two successors ruled for 13 months and 5 years respectively. According to the Burmese chronicles (Maha Yazawin Vol. 3 2006: 152), Thado Kyaw came to power c. March 1614. It means the latest time Nawrahta died would have been around February 1608.) His death was followed by a power struggle between his two eldest sons. The eldest son Tu Laung was at Ayutthaya. While one faction of the court invited Tu Laung to take over the Chiang Mai throne, another faction proclaimed the middle son Minye Deibba as king in Chiang Mai. Tu Laung and his Siamese army laid siege to Chiang Mai. Thirteen months after Nawrahta's death, in late 1608/early 1609, Tu Laung died outside the city, and his Siamese army retreated. Note that the Chiang Mai Chronicle considers Tu Laung king for 13 months, even if he never set foot inside Chiang Mai as king.

== Poetry ==
Like his chief queen, Nawrahta was an accomplished poet. The chronicle Zinme Yazawin contains some of their more famous yadu poems. According to the historian Ni Ni Myint, yadu is "a poetic form in which three stanzas are linked by the rhyming of their last lines, the yadu had its golden age in the 16th and early 17th century. The poem generally evokes a mood of wistful sadness through the contemplation of nature in the changing seasons or the yearning for a loved one temporarily separated." The following is a translation by Ni Ni Myint of one of his more famous poems about Hsinbyushin Medaw.

None there be in the thousand lands
Though should I search
Let alone an equal I will find none
To match a strand of her hair
Fragrant as attar of jasmine
Sweet-voiced, pleasant of expression
Generous of thought, lovely of disposition
My heap of life
The warm nest of my sight

== Family ==
Nawrahta Minsaw had one daughter and three sons by the chief queen Hsinbyushin Medaw, and five daughters and two sons by minor queens.

His children by the chief queen were:

Name	Birth–death	Notes
Bayin Hnamadaw	8 May 1578 – after 1615	Queen of King Naresuan of Ayutthaya (1596–1605)
Thado Minsaw (Tu Laung)	June 1579 – 1608/09	Siamese-backed King of Lan Na (r. 1607/08–1608/09)
Minye Deibba	1580s – March 1614	King of Lan Na (r. 1607/08–1614)
Thado Kyaw	1580s – 21 December 1614	King of Lan Na (r. 1614)

His children by the junior queens were:

#	Name	Mother	Brief
1.	Min Hari	Sao Nang Pong Htip the daughter of Thao Hkam Pan Gov.of Lamphun	Son, Gov. of Pinya in 1615 with the title of Min Hla Nawrahta in the reign of Anaukpetlun
2.	Khin Mwe Mi	Sao Nang Pong Htip the daughter of Thao Hkam Pan Gov.of Lamphun	Daughter
3.	Min A-Lat	Khine Ma Hnet Hla the daughter of Min Thiha of Yamethin	Daughter
4.	Min A-Htwe	Tharrawaddy Kadaw Myat Mi Pan Hla the daughter of Binnya Talamin Sitaw, Wareru dynasty's descendant	Daughter, married to Binnya Nandameit Gov. of Tharrawaddy
5.	Min A-Nge	Pathein Minthami Mi Don Sone the niece of Binnya Ae-Lawkhè	Daughter, married to King Thalun with the title Thummana Dewi they had one daughter Aggapatta and one son Minye Kutha
6.	Shin Mye-Kwa	Me Bwar or Yat Htip Hpa the daughter of Thao Singh Hkam the Gov. of Mongyom	Daughter, Queen of King Keo Koumane of Lan Xang
7.	Shin Sa Aè	Kaew Sakkarn the daughter of Maung Sakhaun the Nang Khuen Kaew the Chiangmai family	Son, the saopha of Möng Khaung (present in Amphoe Chiang Dao) and Mong Hpayak onward

== In popular culture ==
Nawrahta is notably portrayed by veteran actor Chalit Fuengarom in the Thai film hexalogy The Legend of King Naresuan, which also depicts the campaigns that he launched against Siam at the behest of his brother, Nanda Bayin.

== Bibliography ==
- Aung-Thwin, Michael A.; Maitrii Aung-Thwin (2012). A History of Myanmar Since Ancient Times (illustrated ed.). Honolulu: University of Hawai'i Press. ISBN 978-1-86189-901-9.
- Fernquest, Jon (Spring 2005). "The Flight of Lao War Captives from Burma back to Laos in 1596: A Comparison of Historical Sources" (PDF). SOAS Bulletin of Burma Research. 3 (1). ISSN 1479-8484. Archived from the original (PDF) on 2022-01-18.
- Harvey, G. E. (1925). History of Burma: From the Earliest Times to 10 March 1824. London: Frank Cass & Co. Ltd.
- Kala, U (1724). Maha Yazawin (in Burmese). Vol. 1–3 (2006, 4th printing ed.). Yangon: Ya-Pyei Publishing.
- Ni Ni Myint (2004). Selected Writings of Ni Ni Myint. Yangon: Myanmar Historical Commission.
- Ratchasomphan (Sænluang.) (1994). David K. Wyatt (ed.). The Nan Chronicle. SEAP Publications. ISBN 9780877277156.
- Royal Historical Commission of Burma (1832). Hmannan Yazawin (in Burmese). Vol. 1–3 (2003 ed.). Yangon: Ministry of Information, Myanmar.
- Simms, Peter; Sanda Simms (2001). The Kingdoms of Laos: Six Hundred Years of History (illustrated ed.). Psychology Press. ISBN 9780700715312.
- Sithu Gamani Thingyan (2003) [1762]. Tun Aung Chain (ed.). Zinme Yazawin. Translated by Thaw Kaung; Ni Ni Myint. Yangon: Universities Historical Research Center.
- Than Tun (1985). The Royal Orders of Burma, A.D. 1598–1885. Vol. 2. Kyoto University. pp. [7]–[18]. hdl:2433/173789.
- Wyatt, David K. (1998). David K. Wyatt; Aroonrut Wichienkeeo (eds.). The Chiang Mai Chronicle (illustrated ed.). Silk Worms Books. ISBN 978-9747100624.
- Wyatt, David K. (2003). Thailand: A Short History (2 ed.). Yale University Press. ISBN 978-0-300-08475-7.

Nawrahta Minsaw Toungoo Dynasty Born: 1551/52 Died: 1607/08
Regnal titles
Preceded by Wisutthi Thewi	King of Lan Na; 28 January 1579 – 1607/08	Succeeded by Thado Minsaw; Minye Deibba
Royal titles
Preceded by Minye Kyawhtin	Governor of Tharrawaddy; 27 February 1574 – 28 January 1579	Succeeded by
