= Myat Hpone Pyo =

Myat Hpone Pyo မြတ်ဘုန်းပြို

Princess consort of Tharrawaddy
- Tenure: c. 1460 – c. late 1470s
- Predecessor: Min Hla Htut or Saw Min Phyu
- Successor: vacant (Note: Thado Minsaw did not appoint a governor of Tharrawaddy until early 1325 (late 886 ME per (Yazawin Thit Vol. 1 2012: 327–328).)
- Born: c. early 1440s Prome (Pyay)? Ava Kingdom
- Died: c. late 1470s? Tharrawaddy; Ava Kingdom
- Spouse: Thado Minsaw of Prome (c. 1460–1470s?)
- Issue among others...: Minye Nawrahta; Bayin Htwe
- House: Ava
- Father: Saw Shwe Khet
- Mother: Saw Min Phyu
- Religion: Theravada Buddhism

Myat Hpone Pyo (Burmese: မြတ်ဘုန်းပြို, pronounced [mjaʔ pʰóʊɴ pjò]; also spelled မြတ်ဖုန်းဖြိုး, [mjaʔ pʰóʊɴ pʰjó]) was the chief wife of Gov. Thado Minsaw of Tharrawaddy. She was the mother of King Bayin Htwe of Prome (r. 1526–1532), and paternal grandmother of kings Narapati of Prome (r. 1532–1539) and Minkhaung of Prome (r. 1539–1542).

== Brief ==
Myat Hpone Pyo (or Myat Hpone Hpyo) was the youngest child of Princess Saw Min Phyu and Saw Shwe Khet, who was governor of Prome (r. 1417–1422; 1442–1446) and Tharrawaddy (r. 1422–1427; 1446–1460). The princess was a granddaughter of the famous crown prince Minye Kyawswa of Ava, and a great granddaughter of King Minkhaung I of Ava from her mother's side, and a descendant of King Kyawswa of Pagan from both sides. She had two full siblings: Gov. Minye Kyawswa I of Kalay and Saw Myat Lay; and three half-siblings. (Note: Per (Hmannan Vol. 2 2003: 84, 90), Shwe Khet had two children by his first wife Saw Myo Ke; and per (Hmannan Vol. 2 2003: 53), he had a daughter with Min Hla Htut.)

Though the royal chronicles do not state her place of birth, Myat Hpone Pyo was most probably born and raised in Prome where her father was governor between 1442 and 1446, and raised in Tharrawaddy, the southernmost district of Prome to which her father was reassigned, from 1446 onwards to c. 1460. The princess remained in Tharrawaddy as she was married off to the incoming governor, Thado Minsaw, the youngest son of then King Narapati I of Ava. She had six children with Thado Minsaw, and died in Tharrawaddy.

== Family ==
Myat Hpone Pyo and Thado Minsaw had three sons and three daughters, according to the chronicle Yazawin Thit. (Note: Based on the name Bodaw Hnamadaw ("Younger Sister of Royal Great Grandfather"), the Yazawin Thit's list appears to have been sourced from a list made by a great grandchild of Gov. Minye Nawrahta of Tharrawaddy.)

1. Mi Hpone-Gyi, wife of Minye Theingathu of Kandwin, son of Mingyi Swa
2. Minye Nawrahta, Gov. of Tharrawaddy (r. 1525–1531), in revolt (1531 onwards), married to his first cousin Min Hla Myat, daughter of Mingyi Swa
3. Mibaya Khaung Medaw, wife of Minye Theingathu of Kandwin
4. Bodaw Hnamadaw, wife of Mingyi Khame
5. Bayin Htwe, King of Prome (r. 1526–1532)
6. unnamed son

== Ancestry ==
The following is the princess's ancestry according to the royal chronicles.

Ancestry of Myat Hpone Pyo

8. Min Shin Saw of Thayet
4. Thinkhaya of Pagan
9. unnamed
2. Saw Shwe Khet
10. Thinkhaya of Wadi
5. Saw Min Pu
11. Saw Pale of Wadi
1. Myat Hpone Pyo
12. Minkhaung I of Ava
6. Minye Kyawswa
13. Shin Mi-Nauk
3. Saw Min Phyu
14. Tarabya I of Pakhan
7. Saw Min Hla
15. unnamed

== Bibliography ==
- Kala, U (1724). Maha Yazawin (in Burmese). Vol. 1–3 (2006, 4th printing ed.). Yangon: Ya-Pyei Publishing.
- Maha Sithu (2012) [1798]. Kyaw Win; Thein Hlaing (eds.). Yazawin Thit (in Burmese). Vol. 1–3 (2nd ed.). Yangon: Ya-Pyei Publishing.
- Royal Historical Commission of Burma (1832). Hmannan Yazawin (in Burmese). Vol. 1–3 (2003 ed.). Yangon: Ministry of Information, Myanmar.

Myat Hpone Pyo Ava Born: c. early 1440s Died: c. late 1470s
Royal titles
Preceded by Min Hla Htut or Saw Min Phyu	Princess consort of Tharrawaddy c. 1460 – c.1470s	Vacant
