= Saw Myat Lay =

Saw Myat Lay စောမြတ်လေး

Chief Queen Consort of Prome
- Tenure: 1482 – ?
- Predecessor: herself (as Vicereine of Prome)
- Successor: Shwe Zin Gon

Vicenreine of Prome
- Tenure: c. 1450s–1482
- Predecessor: Atula Thiri Maha Yaza Dewi of Ava
- Successor: herself (as Queen consort of Prome)
- Born: c. late 1430s Prome (Pyay)? Ava Kingdom
- Died: Unknown; Prome; Prome Kingdom
- Spouse: Mingyi Swa of Prome (c. 1450s–1482); Thado Minsaw of Prome (1482–?)
- Issue among others...: 11 children including Shwe Zin Gon
- House: Ava
- Father: Saw Shwe Khet
- Mother: Saw Min Phyu
- Religion: Theravada Buddhism

Saw Myat Lay (Burmese: စောမြတ်လေး, pronounced [sɔ́ mjaʔ lé]) was the chief queen consort of King Thado Minsaw of Prome. Prior, she had been the chief wife of Viceroy Mingyi Swa of Prome since c. 1450s.

== Brief ==
Saw Myat Lay was the second child of Princess Saw Min Phyu and Saw Shwe Khet, who was governor of Prome (r. 1417–1422; 1442–1446) and Tharrawaddy (r. 1422–1427; 1446–1460). Likely born in the late 1430s, (Note: Given that her mother Saw Min Phyu was born only in 1415 per (Hmannan Vol. 2 2003: 54), and that her first husband Mingyi Swa was born c. 1435, Myat Lay may have been born in the late 1430s.) the princess was a granddaughter of the famous crown prince Minye Kyawswa of Ava, and a great granddaughter of King Minkhaung I of Ava from her mother's side, and a descendant of King Kyawswa of Pagan from both sides. She had two full siblings: Gov. Minye Kyawswa I of Kalay and Myat Hpone Pyo; and three half-siblings. (Note: Per (Hmannan Vol. 2 2003: 84, 90), Shwe Khet had two children by his first wife Saw Myo Ke; and per (Hmannan Vol. 2 2003: 53), he had a daughter with Min Hla Htut.)

Though the royal chronicles do not state her place of birth, Myat Lay was raised in Prome where her father was governor between 1442 and 1446, and in Tharrawaddy, the southernmost district of Prome to which her father was reassigned, from 1446 onwards until her marriage. She returned to Prome, perhaps in the 1450s, when she was married to Viceroy Mingyi Swa, the second son of then King Narapati I of Ava. She became the vicereine of Prome, and had 11 children with Swa.

Myat Lay became the chief queen consort in 1482. That year, Viceroy Swa died, and his younger brother Gov. Thado Minsaw of Tharrawaddy seized the viceroyalty of Prome, and declared Prome's independence from Ava. In the process, he also raised his sister-in-law Myat Lay as his chief queen. Thado Minsaw's rebellion was successful; Prome became an independent state with territories that included Tharrawaddy in the south and Myede in the north. It was the last mention of Myat Lay in the chronicles. Thado Minsaw lived until 1526 but it is unclear if Myat Lay survived him until then.

== Family ==
Myat Lay and her first husband Swa had 11 children (four sons and seven daughters). She did not have any children with her second husband.

Husband	Title	Issue	Reference
Mingyi Swa of Prome	Viceroy of Prome	Pyu Saw; Khin Hpone Gyi, queen consort of King Minkhaung II; Mingyi Yaukkhamadaw (daughter); Minye Kyawswa; Soe Min (daughter); Khin Hpone Htut, wife of Minye Kyawswa II of Kalay; Min Taya Hnamadaw; Minye Theingathu of Kandwin, husband of Mi Hpone Gyi and Mibaya Khaung Medaw of Tharrawaddy; Min Hla Myat, wife of Minye Nawrahta of Tharrawaddy; Mingyi Khamedaw, husband of Bodaw Hnamadaw; Shwe Zin Gon, Queen of Prome	
Thado Minsaw of Prome	King of Prome	none	

== Ancestry ==
The following is the queen's ancestry according to the royal chronicles.

Ancestry of Queen Myat Lay

8. Min Shin Saw of Thayet
4. Thinkhaya of Pagan
9. unnamed
2. Saw Shwe Khet
10. Thinkhaya of Wadi
5. Saw Min Pu
11. Saw Pale of Wadi
1. Myat Lay
12. Minkhaung I of Ava
6. Minye Kyawswa
13. Shin Mi-Nauk
3. Saw Min Phyu
14. Tarabya I of Pakhan
7. Saw Min Hla
15. unnamed

== Bibliography ==
- Kala, U (1724). Maha Yazawin (in Burmese). Vol. 1–3 (2006, 4th printing ed.). Yangon: Ya-Pyei Publishing.
- Maha Sithu (2012) [First published 1798]. Kyaw Win; Thein Hlaing (eds.). Yazawin Thit (in Burmese). Vol. 1–3 (2nd ed.). Yangon: Ya-Pyei Publishing.
- Royal Historical Commission of Burma (1832). Hmannan Yazawin (in Burmese). Vol. 1–3 (2003rd ed.). Yangon: Ministry of Information, Myanmar.

Saw Myat Lay Prome Born: c. late 1430s
Royal titles
Preceded by herself as Vicereine of Prome	Chief Queen Consort of Prome; 1482–?	Succeeded by Shwe Zin Gon
