= List of rulers of Prome =

This is a list of rulers of Prome (Pyay) from the end of Pagan period to the beginning of Restored Toungoo Dynasty of Burma (Myanmar). Strategically located at the border of the Hanthawaddy kingdom, the city of Prome (Pyay) was governed closely by the central government throughout the Small Kingdoms period (1287–1555). Unlike in other locations, the high kings at Ava by and large did not allow hereditary viceroyship at Prome. A new governor, usually a senior prince close to the royal family, was appointed. The arrangement broke down in 1482 when the Prome Kingdom gained independence from Ava. In the early 17th century, Restored Toungoo kings abolished then existing hereditary viceroyships throughout the entire Irrawaddy valley. (Note: See (Hmannan Vol. 2 2003: 214–216) and (Maha Yazawin 2006: 163–165) for Prome's leadership changes during the Pinya and Ava periods. See (Lieberman 2003: 161–162) for abolishing of hereditary viceroyships.) After Pye Min, the office became strictly an appointed mayoralty, with the title of the office changed to wun (mayor/minister) from hitherto prevalent titles min (viceroy) or ne-sa (governor).

== List of rulers ==
The following list is per the standard Burmese chronicles Maha Yazawin and Hmannan Yazawin, unless otherwise noted. The Yazawin Thit chronicle reports a slightly different list. The summary lists of the rulers of Prome in both Maha Yazawin and Hmannan Yazawin are internally inconsistent in terms of dates with their own reporting in the narrative sections. See the individual articles for inconsistencies.

Name	Term From	Term Until	Relationship to predecessor(s)	Overlord	Notes
Thihathu I	1275 (Note: Per scholarship (Yazawin Thit Vol. 1 2012: 326, footnote 1). Both standard chronicles Maha Yazawin (Maha Yazawin Vol. 2 2006: 163) and Hmannan (Hmannan Vol. 2 2003: 214) state that the city of Prome was reestablished by Thihathu of Prome, a son of Narathihapate, in 604 ME (1242/1243 CE). However, Thihathu could not have founded the city in 1242/1243 since his father Narathihapate was born only in 1238. Scholarship gives 1275.)	1288	Appointed	Narathihapate (1275–1287)	In revolt (1287–88)
Pazzawta	c. 1288	c. 1305	Chief Minister of Thihathu I	Kyawswa (1289–1297); Myinsaing brothers (1297–1310)	According to Yazawin Thit
Kyaswa	c. 1305	c. 1344	Younger brother of Thihathu I	Myinsaing brothers (1297–1310); Thihathu (1310–1325)	
Saw Yan Naung	c. 1344	1377/78	Grandson of Thihathu I	Pinya kings (c. 1344–1364); Thado Minbya (1364–1367); Swa Saw Ke (1367–1377/78)	Elder brother of Swa Saw Ke of Ava
Myet-Hna Shay	1377/78	1388/89	Nephew	Swa Saw Ke	
Htihlaing	1388/89	1390	Appointed	Swa Saw Ke	
Letya Pyanchi	1390	c. April 1413	Appointed	Swa Saw Ke (1390–1400); Tarabya (1400); Minkhaung I (1400–1413)	
Sokkate	c. April 1413	July 1413	Appointed	Minkhaung I	Acting governor
Minye Kyawswa I	c. July 1413	c. November 1413	Appointed	Minkhaung I	Minye Kyawswa Saw Shwe Khet, not the crown prince
Thihathu II	c. November 1413	c. November 1416	Appointed	Minkhaung I	Later King Thihathu of Ava
Minye Kyawswa II	c. November 1416	c. January 1422	Appointed	Minkhaung I (1416–1421); Thihathu (1421–1425)	Reappointed to be governor of Tharrawaddy
Min Maha	c. January 1422	c. December 1429	Appointed	Min Hla (1425); Kale Kye-Taung Nyo (1425–1426); Mohnyin Thado (1426–1429)	Reappointed to be governor of Sagu
Thihathu III	c. December 1429	c. March 1442	Appointed	Mohnyin Thado (1429–1439); Minye Kyawswa I (1439–1442)	Later known as King Narapati I of Ava
Minye Kyawswa II	by 11 March 1442	January 1446	Appointed	Narapati I	Second term at Prome; Brother-in-law of Narapati I; Again reappointed to be governor of Tharrawaddy
Mingyi Swa	January 1446	1482	Appointed	Narapati I (1446–1468); Thihathura I (1468–1480); Minkhaung II (1480–1482)	
Thado Minsaw	1482	February 1527	Son of Narapati of Ava	None	Independent
Bayin Htwe	by 1 March 1527	c. December 1532	Son	None	Independent
Narapati	c. December 1532	c. February 1539	Son	Thohanbwa	Vassal of Confederation of Shan States
Minkhaung	c. February 1539	19 May 1542	Brother	Thohanbwa	Vassal of Confederation of Shan States
Thado Dhamma Yaza I	19 May 1542	30 August 1551	Appointed	Tabinshwehti (1542–1550)	Tutor of Tabinshwehti; In revolt (1550–51)
Thado Dhamma Yaza II	30 August 1551	Nov/Dec 1588	Appointed	Bayinnaung (1551–1581); Nanda (1581–1588)	Younger brother of Bayinnaung
Thado Dhamma Yaza III	26 February 1589	15 September 1597	Appointed	Nanda (1588–1594)	Son of Nanda; in revolt (1595–97)
Yan Naing	17 September 1597	13 July 1608	Usurper	None	Independent; Taken to Ava as POW
Thado Dhamma Yaza IV	2 November 1620	9 July 1628	Appointed	Anaukpetlun (1620–1628)	Later known as King Thalun
Minye Thiha, born (Udein Kyawhtin)	June 1630	1650	Appointed	Thalun	
Pye Min	13 September 1650	3 June 1661	Appointed	Pindale	

== See also ==
- Prome Kingdom
- Sri Ksetra Kingdom
- List of Burmese monarchs
- List of rulers of Ava
- List of rulers of Martaban
- List of rulers of Pegu
- List of rulers of Toungoo

== Bibliography ==
- Kala, U (2006) [1724]. Maha Yazawin (in Burmese). Vol. 1–3 (4th printing ed.). Yangon: Ya-Pyei Publishing.
- Lieberman, Victor B. (2003). Strange Parallels: Southeast Asia in Global Context, c. 800–1830, volume 1, Integration on the Mainland. Cambridge University Press. ISBN 978-0-521-80496-7.
- Royal Historical Commission of Burma (2003) [1832]. Hmannan Yazawin (in Burmese). Vol. 1–3. Yangon: Ministry of Information, Myanmar.
