= Thihathura of Ava =

King of Ava (1431–1480)

Thihathura သီဟသူရ (အင်းဝ)

King of Ava
- Reign: 24 July 1468 – c. August 1480
- Predecessor: Narapati I
- Successor: Minkhaung II
- Born: 1 May 1431; Tuesday, 5th waning of Kason 793 ME (Note: Zatadawbon Yazawin (Zata 1960: 47, 77) says he was born on Tuesday, 5th waning of Kason 788 ME, which translates to Thursday, 25 April 1426. But Hmannan Yazawin (Hmannan Vol. 2 2003: 110) suggests he was born in either 792 or 793 ME. Since Hmannan also says he came to power at age 37 (in his 38th year) on 24 July 1468, his birth date must have been in 793 ME. Indeed, 5th waning of Kason 793 ME was Tuesday, 1 May 1431.); Prome (Pyay)
- Died: c. August 1480 (aged 49); Ava (Inwa)
- Consort: Ameitta Thiri Maha Dhamma Dewi
- Issue: Minkhaung II; Minye Kyawswa of Yamethin
- House: Mohnyin
- Father: Narapati
- Mother: Atula Thiri Maha Yaza Dewi
- Religion: Theravada Buddhism

Thihathura of Ava (Burmese: သီဟသူရ (အင်းဝ), pronounced [θìha̰θùja̰]; also Maha Thihathura; 1431–1480) was king of Ava from 1468 to 1480. He was the last king of Ava who was able to hold on to the increasingly fractious kingdom in its entirety. Soon after succeeding his father Narapati, the new king had to put down a rebellion in Toungoo (Taungoo) in 1470, and suppressed an insurrection by his brother the lord of Prome (Pyay), whom the king pardoned. He gained submission of the eastern Shan state of Yawnghwe, and quelled a potential rebellion in the northern Shan states of Mohnyin and Mogaung. He was succeeded by his son Minkhaung II.

== Early life ==
Thihathura was born in 1431 to Viceroy Narapati of Prome and his chief wife Atula Thiri Maha Dhamma Yaza Dewi, a descendant of Pinya royalty. Thihathura was the eldest of eight children by the couple; he had five younger full sisters and two full brothers Mingyi Swa and Thado Minsaw. Not yet twelve, the young prince was made heir apparent when his father ascended to the Ava throne in January 1442 (Tabodwe 804 ME).

== Accession ==
Thihathura ascended to the Ava throne in July 1468 after his father King Narapati died in Prome, having fled from an assassination attempt by one of Thihathura's sons a year earlier. The middle son of Thihathura had stabbed his grandfather the king because the king had disapproved of the young prince's wish to marry his first cousin, daughter of Princess of Sagaing, Thihathura's eldest sister. Thihathura did not punish the son, and instead allowed him to marry the girl for whom he had stabbed his grandfather, and gave the towns of Sakut, Salin, Baunglin, Legaing, Myo-htit, Taungta, Mindon, Thayet, Myede, Kanyin, and Myaung. He made his elder son, Minkhaung II, crown prince and gave Dabayin as an appanage. The youngest son Minye Kyawswa was given Yamethin to govern.

== Reign ==
The queen dowager Atula Thiri was shocked by her son's decision not to punish his son for stabbing his grandfather, and instigated Toungoo to revolt. Toungoo, a remote province in the southeastern part of Ava Kingdom, had a long history of insurrections. Its last rebellion lasted seven years (1451–1458). Toungoo called in help from Hanthawaddy Pegu. Thihathura dispatched an army under Gen. Sithu Kyawhtin, who was accompanied by two of his sons. The governor of Toungoo resisted with the help of Pegu but was defeated in 1470. The princes spared the rebellious governor's life, and carried him off to Ava, leaving Sithu Kyawhtin as the head of the troublesome province.

Next, the king sent an army to gain submission of Prome, and pardoned his brother Mingyi Swa who was lord there. In 1475 the king with help from the Shan State of Hsipaw (Thibaw) raided Yawnghwe (Nyaungshwe), securing its submission. In early 1476 (837 ME), he sent an expedition against Hanthawaddy, and raided Kawlia near Hlaing. In 1476, Sithu Kyawhtin, lord of Toungoo, enlarged his town. The ministers perceived that this meant Toungoo was about to revolt but the king showed them they were wrong by telling him to let himself be dragged by the hair to court; he did so, saying "It is my king’s command".

He turned his attention to the Shan states of Mohnyin and Mogaung in the north which had not openly revolted but not explicitly submitted to the new king either. In 1472, he asked China to honor its 1454 recognition of the Shan states as Burmese. China warned not to obstruct the trade route from Yunnan to Burma but would not reaffirm its previous recognition. Ava had to wait until its affairs in the south sorted out. In late 1476 (838 ME), Thiahthura personally led a large-scale expedition to Mohnyin and Mogaung. The king sailed up the Irrawaddy river with 7000 troops and his youngest son Minye Kyawswa of Yamethin marched by land with another 7000 troops, 300 elephants and 6000 horses. Only then did the rulers of the region submit in advance of the king's armies.

Thihathura sent envoys to Ceylon in 1474. The envoys brought a broom made of the hair of the king and queen, and its handle studded with gems to sweep the floor of the Temple of the Tooth at Kandy.

== Death ==
Thihathura died c. August 1480 at age 49 (50th year). (Note: The two main standard Burmese chronicles differ on the death year. (Maha Yazawin Vol. 1 2006: 354): Maha Yazawin says he died in 1482 at age 53 (54th year) while the later chronicle Hmannan Yazawin says 1480 at age 49 (50th year). (Harvey 1925: 101–102) gives 1481. Based on Hmannan's reporting, he died soon after July 1480 since (Hmannan Vol. 2 2003: 110) says he had reigned for 12 years.)

== Bibliography ==
- Fernquest, Jon (Autumn 2005). "Min-gyi-nyo, the Shan Invasions of Ava (1524–27), and the Beginnings of Expansionary Warfare in Toungoo Burma: 1486–1539" (PDF). SOAS Bulletin of Burma Research. 3 (2). Archived from the original (PDF) on 2008-10-10.
- Fernquest, Jon (Autumn 2006). "Crucible of War: Burma and the Ming in the Tai Frontier Zone (1382–1454)" (PDF). SOAS Bulletin of Burma Research. 4 (2). Archived from the original (PDF) on 2009-02-19.
- Harvey, G. E. (1925). History of Burma: From the Earliest Times to 10 March 1824. London: Frank Cass & Co. Ltd.
- Phayre, Lt. Gen. Sir Arthur P. (1883). History of Burma (1967 ed.). London: Susil Gupta.
- Royal Historians of Burma (c. 1680). U Hla Tin (Hla Thamein) (ed.). Zatadawbon Yazawin (1960 ed.). Historical Research Directorate of the Union of Burma.
- Royal Historical Commission of Burma (1832). Hmannan Yazawin (in Burmese). Vol. 1–3 (2003 ed.). Yangon: Ministry of Information, Myanmar.

Thihathura of Ava Ava Kingdom Born: 1 May 1431 Died: c. August 1480
Regnal titles
Preceded by Narapati I	King of Ava; 24 July 1468 – c. August 1480	Succeeded by Minkhaung II
Royal titles
Preceded by Narapati I	Heir to the Burmese Throne; January 1442 – 24 July 1468	Succeeded by Minkhaung II
