= Saw Shwe Khet =

Minye Kyawswa Saw Shwe Khet; မင်းရဲကျော်စွာ စောရွှေခက်

Governor of Tharrawaddy
- Reign: c. November 1446 – 1460
- Predecessor: Anawrahta Saw (Pegu vassal)
- Successor: Thado Minsaw
- Monarch: Narapati I

Governor of Prome
- Reign: by 11 March 1442 – c. January 1446
- Predecessor: Thihathu III
- Successor: Mingyi Swa
- Monarch: Narapati I

Governor of Tharrawaddy
- Reign: by early 1422 – January 1427
- Predecessor: ?
- Successor: Anawrahta Saw (Pegu vassal)
- Monarch: Thihathu (1422–25); Min Hla (1425); Min Nyo (1425–26); Thado (1426–27)

Governor of Prome
- Reign: c. March 1417 – c. early 1422
- Predecessor: Thihathu II
- Successor: Min Maha
- Monarch: Minkhaung I
- Born: c. 1390s Pagan (Bagan)? Ava Kingdom
- Died: in or after 1473; Paungde? Ava Kingdom
- Spouse: Saw Myo Ke; Min Hla Htut (m. 1403/04–?); Saw Min Phyu
- Issue among others...: Min Phyu of Sagaing; Minye Kyawswa I of Kale; Saw Myat Lay; Myat Hpone Pyo
- House: Pagan
- Father: Thinkhaya of Pagan
- Mother: Saw Min Pu
- Religion: Theravada Buddhism

Minye Kyawswa Saw Shwe Khet (Burmese: မင်းရဲကျော်စွာ စောရွှေခက်, pronounced [mɪ́ɴjɛ́ tɕɔ̀zwà sɔ́ ʃwè kʰɛʔ]) Tai name Sao Hswe Kaew (ၸဝ်ႈသႂၺ်ႇၵႅဝ်ႈ) was governor of Prome (Pyay), a major vassal state of Ava, from 1417 to 1422, and from 1442 to 1446. He was the only governor or viceroy of Prome to serve more than one term. He also served as governor of districts of Prome: twice at Tharrawaddy (Thayawadi) (1422–1427) and (1446–1460) and at Paungde (1460–1470s).

== Early life ==
Saw Shwe Khet was the eldest child of Saw Min Pu and Gov. Thinkhaya of Pagan. He was descended from the Pagan royal line from both sides. He had two younger sisters, Queen Soe Min Wimala Dewi of Hanthawaddy, Queen Atula Thiri Maha Yaza Dewi of Ava, and two younger brothers Cmdr. Uzana of Southern Cavalry and Gov. Thinkhaya of Sagu.

== Career ==
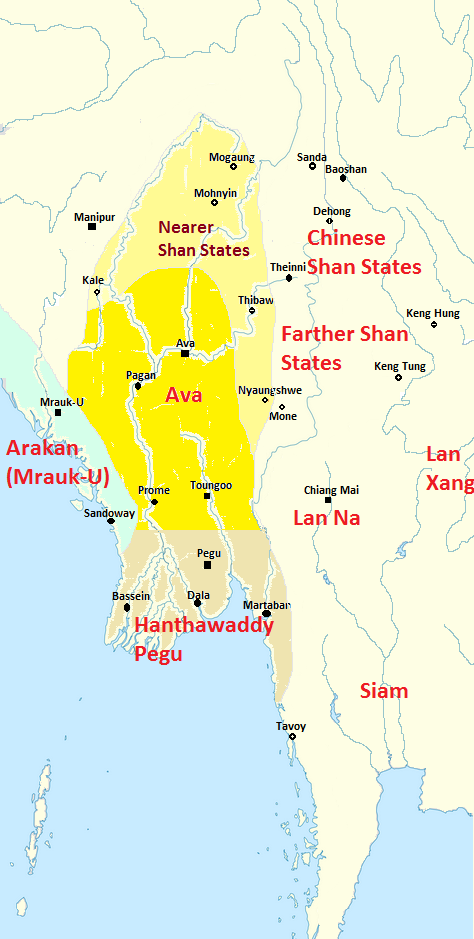
Burma c. 1450. Nearer Shan States were tributaries of Ava.

=== Prome (1417–1422) ===
The first mention of Shwe Khet in the royal chronicles was his appointment as governor of Prome (Pyay) by his half cousin King Minkhaung I. The appointment, which came in March 1417 during the height of Forty Years' War against the Hanthawaddy kingdom, was certainly an important one for Ava (Inwa) as Prome, along with Toungoo (Taungoo), was one of the two major states bordering Hanthawaddy. Shwe Khet, now styled as Minye Kyawswa, succeeded Thihathu, who was recalled to Ava (Inwa) to become the crown prince.

=== Tharrawaddy (1422–1427) ===
Shwe Khet's rule at Prome lasted until Thihathu came to power in 1421. (Note: Chronicles are inconsistent with their own reporting. (Hmannan Vol. 2 2003: 54) says King Thihathu of Ava replaced Gov. Saw Shwe Khet with Min Maha in late 783 ME (c. March 1422). But later the Summary of the Rulers of Prome section (Hmannan Vol. 2 2003: 215) says Min Maha was appointed in 787 ME. It is another case of Burmese numerals ၃ (3) and ၇ (7) being mis-copied.) Shwe Khet tried to curry favor with his new overlord by sending a white elephant, a propitious symbol of Burmese sovereigns. Thihathu accepted the gift but nonetheless demoted Shwe Khet to become a district-level governor at Tharrawaddy (Thayawadi), southernmost district of Prome.

Shwe Khet accepted his new position. At Tharrawaddy, Shwe Khet made an alliance with the new governor of Prome, Min Maha by giving his daughter Shin Yun. But his position at the frontier district became tenuous in 1425–26 when Ava went through a series of succession crises. Kings Thihathu and Min Hla were assassinated in August and November 1425, respectively. Shwe Khet's brother-in-law Gov. Kye-Taung Nyo of Kale (Kalay) seized the Ava throne but lost it six months later when Gov. Thado of Mohnyin toppled Nyo's regime at Ava. Thado himself faced a series of rebellions. Taking advantage of the situation, King Binnya Ran I of Hanthawaddy Pegu seized Tharrawaddy.

Tharrawaddy would remain under Hanthawaddy control until 1446. Ava ceded the region in 1431 in a peace treaty that also sent Shwe Khet's sister Soe Min Wimala Dewi to wed Ran in a marriage of state.

=== Prome (1442–1446) ===
The next mention of Shwe Khet in the chronicles came in 1442 when Viceroy Thihathu III of Prome became king of Ava as Narapati I. The new king, whose chief consort Atula Thiri was Shwe Khet's younger sister, appointed Shwe Khet governor of Prome, and Shwe Khet's son Minye Kyawswa governor of Kale (Kalay). Shwe Khet's term lasted until c. January 1446 when the king recalled Shwe Khet to Ava. (Note: Chronicles (Maha Yazawin Vol. 2 2006: 78; Hmannan Vol. 2 2003: 86) say that King Narapati made new appointments for Toungoo (Taungoo) and Prome (Pyay) following the death of Tarabya of Toungoo in 807 ME (30 March 1445 to 29 March 1446). According to the Toungoo Yazawin chronicle (Sein Lwin Lay 2006: 30–31), Tarabya died on 2 January 1446 (6th waxing of Tabodwe 807 ME). It means the appointments were made sometime between 2 January 1446 and 29 March 1446, and most probably in January 1446.) He was the only governor/ruler to serve more than once at Prome.

=== Tharrawaddy (1446–1460) ===
Shwe Khet's stay at Ava was short. He was once again appointed governor of Tharrawaddy after Narapati regained the territory c. November 1446. (Note: (Hmannan Vol. 2 2003: 88): On 5th waxing of Thadingyut 808 ME (25 September 1446), King Narapati made the decision to send an army and a navy to regain Tharrawaddy after Binnya Ran I had died. Ava forces invaded at the start of the dry season in November. Hanthawaddy vassal Gov. Anawrahta of Tharrawaddy submitted without a fight but died shortly after the submission. Narapati then appointed Shwe Khet.) He ruled for about another 14 years. In 1460, the king reassigned him to Paungde, and appointed his fourth son Thado Minsaw to Tharrawaddy. (Note: (Maha Yazawin Vol. 2 2006: 84) says Shwe Khet was reassigned to Paungde in 821 ME (1459/60) but later chronicles (Yazawin Thit Vol. 1 2012: 293) and (Hmannan Vol. 2 2003: 95) say the reassignment took place in 822 ME (1460/61).) The king also married Thado Minsaw with Shwe Khet's daughter Myat Hpone Pyo.

=== Paungde (1460–1470s) ===
For the next dozen years, Shwe Khet stayed at Paungde. In 1472, Gov. Mingyi Swa of Prome and Gov. Thado Minsaw of Tharrawaddy decided to revolt against their eldest brother King Thihathura of Ava. Shwe Khet, an old man by then, had no choice but to support to his sons-in-law. The rebellion was brief. Thihathura laid siege to Prome in the dry season of 1472–73, and the brothers and Shwe Khet all submitted to the king in February 1473. In exchange for their submission, they were allowed to keep their offices. It was the last mention of Shwe Khet in the chronicles.

== Family ==
Saw Shwe Khet had at least three wives, and three sons and three daughters. (Note: See (Hmannan Vol. 1 2003; 437), (Hmannan Vol. 2 2003: 83–84, 90) and (Yazawin Thit Vol. 1 2012: 264).) His notable descendants include: grandson King Bayin Htwe of Prome (r. 1526–1532); great grandsons King Narapati of Prome (r. 1532–1539) and King Minkhaung of Prome (r. 1539–1542); two times great grandson King Minye Thihathu II of Toungoo (r. 1597–1609); three times great grandson King Natshinnaung of Toungoo (r. 1609–1610). King Leik Munhtaw of Hanthawaddy (r. 1453–1454) was his nephew.

Wife	Brief	Issue	Notes
Saw Myo Ke	First cousin of Shwe Khet; Daughter of his paternal younger uncle Gov. Thinkhaya I of Toungoo	Min Phyu of Sagaing, Governor of Sagaing; Unnamed son, Gov. of Talezi	
Min Hla Htut	Half cousin twice removed Daughter of King Tarabya of Ava; Married in 1403/04 (Note: According to a 1415/16 (777 ME) inscription, Hla Htut and Shwe Khet were married in 765 ME (1403/04).)	Shin Yun (b. c. 1408), wife of Gov. Min Maha of Prome	(Note: According to a 1415/16 (777 ME) inscription, Shin Yun was in her seventh year (aged six) in 1415/16, meaning she was born c. 1408.)
Saw Min Phyu	Half cousin twice removed; Younger daughter of Saw Min Hla and Crown Prince Minye Kyawswa; Born in 1415; married a much older Shwe Khet after Saw Myo Ke's death.	Gov. Minye Kyawswa I of Kale; Saw Myat Lay, wife of Mingyi Swa of Prome, and later Thado Minsaw of Prome; Myat Hpone Pyo, wife of Thado Minsaw of Prome	

== Ancestry ==
The following is his ancestry as given in the Hmannan Yazawin chronicle, based on a contemporary inscription left by his sister Queen Atula Thiri of Ava. He was a half cousin of King Minkhaung I of Ava. (Note: Hmannan (Hmannan Vol. 2 2003: 82) says his father was the youngest paternal uncle of King Minkhaung I. But Thinkhaya could not have been a full paternal uncle since Minkhaung's father Swa Saw Ke did not have any full younger brothers. It likely means Thinkhaya was born to a junior wife of Min Shin Saw of Thayet.)

Ancestry of Gov. Saw Shwe Khet

8. Kyawswa of Pagan
4. Min Shin Saw of Thayet
9. Saw Soe of Pagan
2. Thinkhaya of Pagan
10. unnamed
5. unnamed
11. unnamed
1. Saw Shwe Khet
12. Min Letwe of Sikyay
6. Thinkhaya of Wadi
13. unnamed
3. Saw Min Pu
14. Yandathu II of Lanbu
7. Saw Pale of Wadi
15. Saw Chit-Ke

== Bibliography ==
- Harvey, G. E. (1925). History of Burma: From the Earliest Times to 10 March 1824. London: Frank Cass & Co. Ltd.
- Kala, U (2006) [1724]. Maha Yazawin (in Burmese). Vol. 1–3 (4th printing ed.). Yangon: Ya-Pyei Publishing.
- Maha Sithu (2012) [1798]. Myint Swe; Kyaw Win; Thein Hlaing (eds.). Yazawin Thit (in Burmese). Vol. 1–3 (2nd printing ed.). Yangon: Ya-Pyei Publishing.
- Royal Historical Commission of Burma (2003) [1832]. Hmannan Yazawin (in Burmese). Vol. 1–3. Yangon: Ministry of Information, Myanmar.
- Sein Lwin Lay, Kahtika U (2006) [1968]. Min Taya Shwe Hti and Bayinnaung: Ketumadi Taungoo Yazawin (in Burmese) (2nd printing ed.). Yangon: Yan Aung Sarpay.

Saw Shwe Khet Ava Kingdom Died: in or after 1473
Royal titles
Preceded by Anawrahta as Pegu vassal	Governor of Tharrawaddy c. November 1446 – 1460	Succeeded by Thado Minsaw
Preceded by Thihathu III as Viceroy	Governor of Prome by 11 March 1442 – c. January 1446	Succeeded by Mingyi Swa
Preceded by	Governor of Tharrawaddy c. early 1422 – January 1427	Succeeded by Anawrahta as Pegu vassal
Preceded by Thihathu II as Viceroy	Governor of Prome c. March 1417 – early 1422	Succeeded by Min Maha
