= Minkhaung II =

Minkhaung II ဒုတိယ မင်းခေါင်

King of Ava
- Reign: c. August 1480 – 7 April 1501
- Predecessor: Thihathura
- Successor: Narapati II
- Born: 9 October 1446; Sunday, 4th waning of Thadingyut 808 ME; Ava (Inwa)
- Died: 7 April 1501 (aged 54); 5th waning of Late Tagu 862 ME; Ava
- Consort: Atula Thiri Dhamma Dewi
- Issue: Thihathura II; Narapati II
- House: Mohnyin
- Father: Thihathura
- Mother: Ameitta Thiri Maha Dhamma Dewi
- Religion: Theravada Buddhism

Minkhaung II (Burmese: ဒုတိယ မင်းခေါင် [dṵtḭja̰ mɪ́ɰ̃ɡàʊɰ̃]; 9 October 1446 – 7 April 1501) was king of Ava from 1480 to 1501. His 20-year reign was the beginning of the decline of Ava's hold on Upper Burma. Yamethin, a region to the east of Ava, revolted upon Minkhaung's accession to the Ava throne and stayed independent throughout Minkhaung's reign. The southern regions of Prome and Tharrawaddy revolted in 1482, and also stayed independent. By the mid-1490s, the Shan states of Mohnyin, Mogaung, Momeik and Kale (Kalay) had also broken away, and begun raiding northern Ava territories. Minkhaung increasingly came to rely on Mingyi Nyo, the Viceroy of Toungoo, for military assistance. By the end of his reign, Toungoo was equally powerful as its nominal overlord Ava.

Minkhaung II made his eldest son Thihathura II joint-king and co-ruled the kingdom for 15 years. But Thihathura II died a month before his father. Minkhaung II died in April 1501 and was succeeded by his younger son Shwenankyawshin (Narapati II).

== Years as Crown Prince ==
Minkhaung II was the eldest son of King Thihathura of Ava who made him crown prince during his reign (1468–1480), and was given Dabayin region in fief. His younger brothers also ruled various regions. His uncles Mingyi Swa and Thado Minsaw ruled the southern regions of Prome (Pyay) and Tharrawaddy, respectively.

== Reign ==
King Thihathura died in 1480, and Minkhaung II ascended the throne with the regnal name of Thirithuddhamma Yaza. As had become customary with the accession of each Ava king, Minkhaung needed to secure the loyalty of the rulers of each region in the kingdom. The new king's uncles in Prome and Tharrawaddy scarcely acknowledged him. But closer to Ava, his younger brothers, the rulers of Salin and Se in the west, and the ruler of Yamethin in the southeast openly revolted.

=== Rebellions ===
Minye Kyawswa of Yamethin, which held the five irrigation districts of all important Kyaukse granary, was the greatest threat to Ava's power. Minkhaung ordered Sithu Kyawhtin, the former general and viceroy of Toungoo (Taungoo), to attack Yamethin, which is midway between Ava and Toungoo, from the south, while he marched from the north. But Yamethin's heavily fortified defenses prevailed. Sithu Kyawhtin died in battle, and Minkhaung called off the attack after a two-month-long siege. He appointed Sithu Kyawhtin's son Min Sithu (or Sithunge) as the new governor of Toungoo. Ava continuously tried to subdue Yamethin in subsequent years but the rebellious province managed to stay independent for the rest of his reign.

His inability to regain control of the Kyaukse granary meant Ava was never strong enough to pacify other regions. In 1482, Mingyi Swa of Prome died, and his brother Thado Minsaw of Tharrawaddy took over Prome, and declared himself independent. His nephew the king sent a force to attack Prome. But the Avan army could not take Prome, and retreated. Prome became an independent kingdom with territories up to Tharrawaddy and Myede. (It would stay independent until 1533, and semi-independent under Ava's rule until 1542.)

Still in 1482, the Shan states of Mohnyin and Momeik in the north also revolted. Minkhaung, still focused on Yamethin, could not do much with the other revolts. By the 1490s, the Shan states previously loyal to Ava--Kale (Kalay), Mogaung along with Mohnyin and Momeik had also escaped Ava's control. Only the Shan state of Hsipaw (Thibaw) remained a steadfast ally of Ava. Mohyin in particular resumed its historic role in raiding Upper Burma towns, especially Myedu.

=== Alliance with Mingyi Nyo of Toungoo ===
In 1485, Mingyi Nyo assassinated his uncle Min Sithu, whom Minkhaung appointed as governor of Toungoo only five years earlier. But Nyo quickly sent tributes to Ava. Minkhaung was not in a position to punish Nyo and accepted Nyo's submission. He formally granted Nyo Toungoo. Nyo remained a loyal ally of Ava for the remainder of Minkhaung's reign. In the 1490s, Toungoo fought against Yamethin and Hanthawaddy kingdom in the south. In 1492, after the death of King Dhammazedi of Hanthawaddy, Nyo without Minkhaung's permission, sent a probing raid into Hanthawaddy territory. New Hanthawaddy king Binnya Ran II sent a retaliatory raid in 1495. By the end of his reign, Toungoo was equally powerful as its nominal overlord Ava.

Ava and Yamethin were locked in a series of wars until the end. Minye Kyawswa of Yamethin died in August/September 1500 (Tawthalin 862 ME). His brother Minkhaung died shortly after on 7 April 1501 (5th waning of Tagu 862 ME).

=== Joint rule with his son ===
At his accession to the throne, Minkhaung made his seven-year-old eldest son the heir-apparent. In 1485, Minkhaung II made the 12-year-old prince was made joint-king with the title of Maha Thihathura. The co-regent Thihathura II of Ava lived in the same palace with his father, and displayed a white umbrella as a symbol of sovereignty. He co-ruled with his father for 15 years but died in March 1501, a month before his father.

== Bibliography ==
- Fernquest, Jon (Autumn 2005). "Min-gyi-nyo, the Shan Invasions of Ava (1524–27), and the Beginnings of Expansionary Warfare in Toungoo Burma: 1486–1539" (PDF). SOAS Bulletin of Burma Research. 3 (2). Archived from the original (PDF) on 2008-10-10.
- Kala, U (1720). Maha Yazawin (in Burmese). Vol. 1–3 (2006, 4th printing ed.). Yangon: Ya-Pyei Publishing.
- Phayre, Lt. Gen. Sir Arthur P. (1883). History of Burma (1967 ed.). London: Susil Gupta.
- Royal Historians of Burma (c. 1680). U Hla Tin (Hla Thamein) (ed.). Zatadawbon Yazawin (1960 ed.). Historical Research Directorate of the Union of Burma.
- Royal Historical Commission of Burma (1832). Hmannan Yazawin (in Burmese). Vol. 1–3 (2003 ed.). Yangon: Ministry of Information, Myanmar.

Minkhaung II Ava Kingdom Born: 9 October 1446 Died: 7 April 1501
Regnal titles
Preceded by Thihathura	King of Ava; 1480 – 7 April 1501	Succeeded by Narapati II
Royal titles
Preceded by Thihathura	Heir to the Burmese Throne as Prince of Dabayin; 25 July 1468 – c. August 1480	Succeeded by Thihathura II
