= Saw Min Phyu =

Saw Min Phyu စောမင်းဖြူ

Duchess of Tharrawaddy
- Reign: 1446 – 1460
- Predecessor: unknown
- Successor: Myat Hpone Pyo
- Born: 1414/15; Ava (Inwa); Ava Kingdom
- Died: Unknown; Paungde? Ava Kingdom
- Spouse: Saw Shwe Khet (1430s–?)
- Issue: Minye Kyawswa I of Kale; Saw Myat Lay; Myat Hpone Pyo
- House: Ava
- Father: Minye Kyawswa
- Mother: Saw Min Hla
- Religion: Theravada Buddhism

Saw Min Phyu (Burmese: စောမင်းဖြူ, [sɔ́ mɪ́ɴ bjù]; 1415–?) was a princess of Ava. She was the youngest daughter of the famous Crown Prince Minye Kyawswa, and the mother of Queen Saw Myat Lay of Prome.

== Brief ==
Saw Min Hla was the youngest daughter of Crown Prince Minye Kyawswa and Saw Min Hla. She never knew her father as she was born in the year in which her father fell in action. She later became the third wife of Saw Shwe Khet, her much older half cousin, twice removed. She and Shwe Khet had three children together: Gov. Minye Kyawswa I of Kale, Queen Saw Myat Lay of Prome, and Princess Myat Hpone Pyo of Tharrawaddy.

== Ancestry ==
The princess was descended from Ava, Pagan, and Mohnyin royal lines from her father's side.

Ancestry of Saw Min Phyu

8. Swa Saw Ke of Ava
4. Minkhaung I of Ava
9. Saw Beza
2. Minye Kyawswa
10. Tho Ngan Bwa of Mohnyin
5. Shin Mi-Nauk
11. unnamed
1. Saw Min Phyu
12. unnamed
6. Tarabya I of Pakhan
13. unnamed
3. Saw Min Hla
14. unnamed
7. unnamed
15. unnamed

== Bibliography ==
- Kala, U (1724). Maha Yazawin (in Burmese). Vol. 1–3 (2006, 4th printing ed.). Yangon: Ya-Pyei Publishing.
- Maha Sithu (2012) [1798]. Kyaw Win; Thein Hlaing (eds.). Yazawin Thit (in Burmese). Vol. 1–3 (2nd ed.). Yangon: Ya-Pyei Publishing.
- Royal Historical Commission of Burma (1832). Hmannan Yazawin (in Burmese). Vol. 1–3 (2003 ed.). Yangon: Ministry of Information, Myanmar.

Saw Min Phyu Ava Born: c. 1415
Royal titles
Unknown	Duchess of Tharrawaddy; 1446 – 1460	Succeeded by Myat Hpone Pyo
