= Thado Minsaw of Prome =

Thado Minsaw of Prome; သတိုးမင်းစော

King of Prome
- Reign: 1482 – February 1527
- Predecessor: Mingyi Swa (as Viceroy)
- Successor: Bayin Htwe

Governor of Tharrawaddy
- Reign: 1460–1482
- Predecessor: Saw Shwe Khet
- Successor: Minye Nawrahta
- Born: c. 1440s: Ava (Inwa); Ava Kingdom
- Died: February 1527; Tabaung 888 ME; Prome (Pyay); Prome Kingdom
- Consort: Myat Hpone Pyo (c. 1460–1470s); Saw Myat Lay (1482–?)
- Issue among others...: Minye Nawrahta; Bayin Htwe
- House: Mohnyin
- Father: Narapati I of Ava
- Mother: Atula Thiri Maha Yaza Dewi of Ava
- Religion: Theravada Buddhism

Thado Minsaw of Prome (Burmese: သတိုးမင်းစော, pronounced [ðədó mɪ́ɰ̃sɔ́]; c. 1440s–1526) Tai name Hso Ming Hpa was the founder of Prome Kingdom, and reigned the minor kingdom from 1482 to 1527. In 1524, he entered into an alliance with the Confederation of Shan States, and participated in the 1525 sack of Ava (Inwa).

== Early life ==
He was born Min Ba Saw (မင်းဘစော) to Narapati I of Ava and his chief queen Atula Thiri Maha Yaza Dewi of Ava. He was the seventh of the couple's eight children. He had two elder brothers, four elder sisters and a younger sister. He was married to his first cousin Myat Hpone Pyo, who was the youngest daughter of his maternal uncle Saw Shwe Khet, governor of Prome and later Tharrawaddy. Ba Saw grew up in Ava until 1460 when his father appointed him governor of Tharrawaddy, the southernmost town on the border with the Hanthawaddy kingdom. (Note: (Maha Yazawin Vol. 2 2006: 84) says Ba Saw was appointed governor in 821 ME (1459/60) but later chronicles (Yazawin Thit Vol. 1 2012: 293) and (Hmannan Vol. 2 2003: 95) give 822 ME (1460/61).)

== Governor of Tharrawaddy ==
His first dozen years at Tharrawaddy were non-eventful. He was reappointed to the post when his eldest brother Thihathura I succeeded the Ava throne in 1468. In late 1472/early 1473, Thado Minsaw entered into an alliance with his elder brother Mingyi Swa, the viceroy of Prome, to raise a rebellion against their brother. They expected to receive military aid from King Dhammazedi of Hanthawaddy but the plan did not materialize. Both brothers submitted to Thihathura in February 1473. (Note: (Hmannan Vol. 2 2003: 102): Tabaung 834 ME = 28 January 1473 to 26 February 1473) Thihathura forgave his brothers and reappointed them to their former positions.

== King of Prome ==
After Thihathura died in 1480, the new king Minkhaung II was greeted by a major rebellion by his brother Minye Kyawswa, the governor of Yamethin. In 1482, Thado Minsaw's another elder brother Viceroy Mingyi Swa of Prome also died. Thado Minsaw took advantage of the war between his nephews Minkhaung II and Minye Kyawswa in Upper Burma by taking over Prome, and declaring himself independent. He raised his brother Mingyi Swa's chief wife Saw Myat Lay as his chief queen. Minkhaung II managed to send an army to reclaim Prome. But the Avan army could not take Prome, and retreated after a month due to the fierce bombardment from fire arrows, cannon, and the newly acquired muskets. Ava could not send another force again as the much more serious Yamethin rebellion (and rebellions by the Shan States of Mohnyin and Kale) consumed its resources for the next two decades. Prome became an independent kingdom with territories that included Tharrawaddy in the south and Myede in the north.

Thado Minsaw largely stayed out of the fighting in Upper Burma. He forged a peaceful relationship with Hanthawaddy, the most powerful kingdom in the region. He changed his policy in the 1520s when Ava was on its last legs suffering from the sustained assaults by Confederation of Shan States. He entered into a league with Sawlon, the confederation's leader. On 22 March 1525 (14th waning of Tabaung 886 ME), the combined armies of Confederation and Prome sacked the city of Ava. The king of Ava, Shwenankyawshin, who was Thado Minsaw's grandnephew, escaped. Prome and Confederation forces looted the city. The Prome armies brought back the famed poet monk Shin Maha Rattathara. Prome remained in a league with the Confederation, which continued its attacks on Ava.

Thado Minsaw died in February 1527, (Note: (Hmannan Vol. 2 2003: 215) simply says that he died in 888 ME (30 March 1526 to 29 March 1527). (Yazawin Thit Vol. 1 2012: 321) provides a more specific date: he died in Tabaung 888 ME (31 January 1527 to 1 March 1527).) and was succeeded by his son Bayin Htwe.

== Family ==
Thado Minsaw had three sons and three daughters with his first wife Myat Hpone Pyo, who died in Tharrawaddy before he became king of Prome. In 1482, he married his sister-in-law Saw Myat Lay; they did not have any children.

Wife	Rank	Issue	Reference
Myat Hpone Pyo	First wife	Mi Hpone-Gyi, wife of Minye Theingathu of Kandwin; Minye Nawrahta, Gov. of Tharrawaddy (r. 1525–1531), in revolt (1531 onwards); Mibaya Khaung Medaw, wife of Minye Theingathu of Kandwin; Bodaw Hnamadaw, wife of Mingyi Khame; Bayin Htwe, King of Prome (r. 1527–1532) unnamed son	
Saw Myat Lay	Chief Queen Consort of Prome	none	

== Ancestry ==
Ancestry of Thado Minsaw

8. Saw Diga of Mye-Ne
4. Mohnyin Thado
9. Saw Pale of Nyaungyan
2. Narapati I of Ava
10. Thihapate II of Taungdwin
5. Shin Mi Myat
11. Princess of Myinsaing
1. Min Ba Saw
12. Min Shin Saw of Thayet
6. Thinkhaya of Pagan
13. unnamed
3. Atula Thiri Maha Yaza Dewi of Ava
14. Thinkhaya of Wadi
7. Saw Min Pu
15. Saw Pale of Wadi

== Bibliography ==
- Harvey, G. E. (1925). History of Burma: From the Earliest Times to 10 March 1824. London: Frank Cass & Co. Ltd.
- Kala, U (2006) [1724]. Maha Yazawin (in Burmese). Vol. 1–3 (4th printing ed.). Yangon: Ya-Pyei Publishing.
- Maha Sithu (2012) [1798]. Myint Swe; Kyaw Win; Thein Hlaing (eds.). Yazawin Thit (in Burmese). Vol. 1–3 (2nd printing ed.). Yangon: Ya-Pyei Publishing.
- Royal Historical Commission of Burma. Hmannan Yazawin (in Burmese). Vol. 1–3 (2003 ed.). Yangon: Ministry of Information, Myanmar.
- Sein Lwin Lay, Kahtika U (2006) [1968]. Mintaya Shwe Hti and Bayinnaung: Ketumadi Taungoo Yazawin (in Burmese) (2nd printing ed.). Yangon: Yan Aung Sarpay.

Thado Minsaw of Prome Prome Kingdom Born: 1440s Died: February 1527
Regnal titles
Preceded by Mingyi Swa as Viceroy	King of Prome; 1482–1527	Succeeded by Bayin Htwe
Royal titles
Preceded by Saw Shwe Khet	Governor of Tharrawaddy; 1460–1482	Succeeded by Minye Nawrahta
