= Mingyi Swa of Prome =

Mingyi Swa မင်းကြီးစွာ

Viceroy of Prome
- Reign: 1446–1482
- Predecessor: Saw Shwe Khet (as governor)
- Successor: Thado Minsaw (as king of Prome)
- Born: c. 1435; Prome (Pyay); Ava Kingdom
- Died: 1482; Prome (Pyay); Ava Kingdom
- Spouse: Saw Myat Lay daughter of Minye Kyawhtin of Toungoo
- Issue among others...: Min Hpone Gyi; Shwe Zin Gon
- House: Mohnyin
- Father: Narapati I of Ava
- Mother: Atula Thiri Maha Yaza Dewi of Ava
- Religion: Theravada Buddhism

Mingyi Swa of Prome (Burmese: မင်းကြီးစွာ, pronounced [mɪ́ɰ̃dʑí zwà]; c. 1435–1482) was viceroy of Prome from 1446 to 1482 during the reigns of kings Narapati I, Thihathura I and Minkhaung II of Ava.

== Brief ==
He was born Min Hsin-Mya (မင်းဆင်များ or မင်းဆင်မြား) and Tai name Manggyin Suang (မင်းၸိၼ်ႈသႂိင်) to Viceroy Thihathu of Prome and his chief queen Atula Thiri Maha Yaza Dewi in Prome (Pyay). He was probably born c. 1435. (Note: Chronicles do not explicitly mention his birth date. His eldest sibling Thihathura was born on 1 May 1431. He had two elder sisters in between him and Thihathura, meaning he could have been born no earlier than 1434. Moreover, because he was appointed viceroy in early 1446, he must have been at least around 10. It is probable that he was born around 1435.) He was the fourth of the couple's eight children. He had one elder brother, two elder sisters, one younger brother and three younger sisters. In April 1442, the family moved to Ava (Inwa) when Thihathu succeeded the Ava throne as Narapati I of Ava.

His stay at Ava was short. In January 1446, (Note: Standard chronicles (Maha Yazawin Vol. 2 2006: 78; Hmannan Vol. 2 2003: 86) say that King Narapati made new appointments in Toungoo (Taungoo) and Prome (Pyay) following the death of Tarabya of Toungoo in 807 ME (29 March 1445 to 28 March 1446). According to the Toungoo Yazawin chronicle (Sein Lwin Lay 2006: 30–31), Tarabya died on 2 January 1446 (5th waxing of Tabodwe 807 ME). It means the appointments were made sometime between 2 January 1446 and 28 March 1446, and most probably in January 1446.) Narapati I appointed his second son, then no older than 11 years of age, the viceroy of Prome, the second most important city in the kingdom. He was a loyal son throughout his father's 26-year reign. But in 1472, he tried to revolt against his elder brother King Thihathura I by getting into a league with his younger brother Thado Minsaw, governor of Tharrawaddy. But the planned rebellion never panned out and both brothers submitted to the king in February 1473. (Note: (Hmannan Vol. 2 2003: 102): Tabaung 834 ME = 28 January 1473 to 26 February 1473) Thihathura forgave his brothers and appointed them to their former position. He gave no more trouble when his nephew Minkhaung II became king of Ava in 1480. In return, the new king kept Mingyi Swa at his post.

Swa died in 1482. Thado Minsaw of Tharrawaddy seized Prome, and revolted against Minkhaung II. The rebellion succeeded, and Prome became independent.

== Family ==
Swa and his principal wife Saw Myat Lay had 11 children (four sons and seven daughters). He was also married to the daughter of Minye Kyawhtin of Toungoo and Princess of Yamethin.

Wife	Rank	Issue	Reference
Saw Myat Lay	Vicereine of Prome	Pyu Saw; Khin Hpone Gyi, queen consort of King Minkhaung II; Mingyi Yaukkhamadaw (daughter); Minye Kyawswa; Soe Min (daughter); Khin Hpone Htut, wife of Minye Kyawswa II of Kalay; Min Taya Hnamadaw; Minye Theingathu of Kandwin, husband of Mi Hpone Gyi and Mibaya Khaung Medaw of Tharrawaddy; Min Hla Myat, wife of Minye Nawrahta of Tharrawaddy; Mingyi Khamedaw, husband of Bodaw Hnamadaw; Shwe Zin Gon, Queen of Prome	

== Ancestry ==
Ancestry of Viceroy Mingyi Swa

8. Saw Diga of Mye-Ne
4. Mohnyin Thado
9. Saw Pale of Nyaungyan
2. Narapati I of Ava
10. Thihapate II of Taungdwin
5. Shin Mi Myat
11. Princess of Myinsaing
1. Mingyi Swa
12. Min Shin Saw of Thayet
6. Thinkhaya of Pagan
13. unnamed
3. Atula Thiri Maha Yaza Dewi of Ava
14. Thinkhaya of Wadi
7. Saw Min Pu
15. Saw Pale of Wadi

== Bibliography ==
- Kala, U (2006) [1724]. Maha Yazawin (in Burmese). Vol. 1–3 (4th printing ed.). Yangon: Ya-Pyei Publishing.
- Maha Sithu (2012) [1798]. Kyaw Win; Thein Hlaing (eds.). Yazawin Thit (in Burmese). Vol. 1–3 (2nd ed.). Yangon: Ya-Pyei Publishing.
- Royal Historical Commission of Burma (2003) [1832]. Hmannan Yazawin (in Burmese). Vol. 1–3. Yangon: Ministry of Information, Myanmar.
- Sein Lwin Lay, Kahtika U (2006) [1968]. Mintaya Shwe Hti and Bayinnaung: Ketumadi Taungoo Yazawin (in Burmese) (2nd printing ed.). Yangon: Yan Aung Sarpay.

Mingyi Swa of Prome Ava Kingdom Born: c. 1435 Died: 1482
Royal titles
Preceded by Saw Shwe Khet as governor	Viceroy of Prome; 1446–1482	Succeeded by Thado Minsaw as king
