= Atula Thiri Maha Yaza Dewi of Ava =

Atula Thiri Maha Yaza Dewi အတုလ သီရိ မဟာရာဇ ဒေဝီ

Chief queen consort of Ava
- Tenure: 25 April 1442 – 24 July 1468
- Predecessor: Min Hla Nyet
- Successor: Ameitta Thiri Maha Dhamma Dewi
- Born: 1410s Pagan (Bagan)
- Died: c. 1470s Ava (Inwa)
- Spouse: Narapati of Ava
- Issue: 3 sons and 5 daughters: Thihathura; Shwe Einthe of Twinthin; Min Hla Htut of Sagaing; Mingyi Swa of Prome; Bodaw Me of Kale; Min Mya Htut of Pakhan; Thado Minsaw of Prome; Min Taya Medaw of Pinle
- House: Mohnyin
- Father: Thinkhaya of Pagan
- Mother: Saw Min Pu
- Religion: Theravada Buddhism

Atula Thiri Maha Yaza Dewi of Ava (Burmese: အတုလ သီရိ မဟာရာဇ ဒေဝီ, pronounced [ʔətṵla̰ θìɹḭ məhà jàza̰ dèwì]; Pali: Atulasirimahārājadevī; also known as Atula Maha Dhamma Yaza Dewi) was the chief queen consort of King Narapati I of Ava from 1442 to 1468. She was the mother of King Thihathura of Ava and King Thado Minsaw of Prome, and a maternal aunt of King Leik Munhtaw of Hanthawaddy. King Alaungpaya, the founder of the Konbaung dynasty, was a tenth generation descendant of the queen.

She became the queen dowager in 1468 after her husband died from a stab wound by one of her grandsons. She instigated a rebellion by Toungoo (Taungoo) when her son Thihathura, who was now king, failed to punish the grandson.

== Brief ==
She was the chief consort of Narapati (then known as Thihathu), Viceroy of Prome, from 1429 to 1442. The family moved to Ava (Inwa) in 1442 when her husband succeeded the throne. The couple had to flee Ava 25 years later in June 1467 after Thado Kyaw, one of their grandsons, stabbed Narapati, They never returned to Ava. The king never fully recovered from the stab wound, and died a year later at Prome. She was shocked when her son Thihathura, who was now king, failed to punish his son Thado Kyaw. She nursed a grudge, and in 1470, instigated Letya Zeya Thingyan, Viceroy of Toungoo, to revolt. The rebellion however failed. The chronicles do not say whether or not the queen dowager was punished by her son the king.

== Ancestry ==
The queen was the youngest child of Saw Min Pu and Gov. Thinkhaya of Pagan. She was descended from the Pagan royal line—she was a great-granddaughter of King Kyawswa of Pagan. She was a half cousin as well as niece of King Minkhaung I of Ava (Note: Hmannan (Hmannan Vol. 2 2003: 82) says Thinkhaya of Pagan was the youngest paternal uncle of King Minkhaung I. But Thinkhaya could not have been a full paternal uncle since Minkhaung's father Swa Saw Ke did not have any full younger brothers. It means Thinkhaya was born to a junior wife of Min Shin Saw of Thayet. Moreover (Hmannan Vol. 2 2003: 74) says she was also a niece of Minkhaung I.) although she was about four decades younger. She had four siblings. Her eldest sibling Saw Shwe Khet was viceroy of Prome (Pyay) from 1417 to 1422 and from 1442 to 1446. Her elder sister Soe Min Wimala Dewi was queen of Hanthawaddy Pegu.

Ancestry of Queen Atula Thiri Maha Yaza Dewi

8. Kyawswa of Pagan
4. Min Shin Saw of Thayet
9. Saw Soe of Pagan
2. Thinkhaya of Pagan
10. unnamed
5. unnamed
11. unnamed
1. Atula Thiri
12. Min Letwe of Si-Gyay
6. Thinkhaya of Wadi
13. unnamed
3. Saw Min Pu
14. Yandathu II of Lanbu
7. Saw Pale of Wadi
15. Saw Chit-Ke

== Family ==
She and Narapati had three sons and five daughters.

| Issue | Notes |
|---|---|
| Thihathura of Ava | King of Ava (r. 1468–1480) |
| Shwe Einthe of Twinthin | Duchess of Twinthin, second wife of Thihapate II of Pakhan |
| Min Hla Htut of Sagaing | Duchess of Sagaing |
| Mingyi Swa of Prome | Viceroy of Prome (r. 1446–1482) |
| Bodaw Me of Kale | Duchess of Kale |
| Min Mya Htut of Pakhan | Duchess of Pakhan, third wife of Thihapate II of Pakhan |
| Thado Minsaw of Prome | King of Prome (r. 1482–1527) |
| Min Taya Medaw of Pinle | Duchess of Pinle |

== Bibliography ==
- Letwe Nawrahta and Twinthin Taikwun (1961) [c. 1770]. Hla Thamein (ed.). Alaungpaya Ayedawbon (in Burmese). Ministry of Culture, Union of Burma.
- Maha Sithu (2012) [1798]. Myint Swe; Kyaw Win; Thein Hlaing (eds.). Yazawin Thit (in Burmese). Vol. 1–3 (2nd printing ed.). Yangon: Ya-Pyei Publishing.
- Royal Historical Commission of Burma (2003) [1832]. Hmannan Yazawin (in Burmese). Vol. 1–3. Yangon: Ministry of Information, Myanmar.

Atula Thiri Maha Yaza Dewi of Ava Ava Kingdom Born: 1410s Died: c. 1470s
Royal titles
| Preceded by Min Hla Nyet | Chief queen consort of Ava; 25 April 1442 – 24 July 1468 | Succeeded by Ameitta Thiri Maha Dhamma Dewi |
