= Narapati I of Ava =

Narapati I; နရပတိကြီး

King of Ava
- Reign: by 11 March 1442 – 24 July 1468
- Coronation: 6 April 1442; Friday, 12th waning of Kason 804 ME
- Predecessor: Minye Kyawswa I
- Successor: Thihathura I
- Chief Minister: Yazathingyan

Viceroy of Prome
- Reign: 1429 – 1442
- Predecessor: Min Maha
- Successor: Minye Kyawswa II
- Born: 7 June 1413; Wednesday, 10th waxing of First Waso 775 ME; Mohnyin
- Died: 24 July 1468 (aged 55); Sunday, 5th waxing of Wagaung 830 ME; Prome (Pyay)
- Consort: Atula Thiri Maha Yaza Dewi
- Issue: Three sons and five daughters including: Thihathura of Ava; Mingyi Swa of Prome; Thado Minsaw of Prome
- House: Mohnyin
- Father: Mohnyin Thado
- Mother: Shin Myat Hla
- Religion: Theravada Buddhism

Narapati I of Ava (Burmese: နရပတိ (အင်းဝ), pronounced [nəɹa̰pətḭ]; 7 June 1413 – 24 July 1468) was king of Ava from 1442 to 1468. In the early years of his reign, this former viceroy of Prome (Pyay) was forced to deal with raids from the Shan State of Mogaung as well as the Ming Chinese intrusions into Avan territory (1444–1446). In the wake of renewed Chinese determination to pacify the Yunnan frontier region, Narapati was able to maintain Ava's control of northern Shan States of Kale and Mohnyin, and gained allegiance of Thibaw. However, he continued to have trouble with Toungoo which was in revolt between 1451 and 1459. One of his grandsons made an attempt on his life in June 1467. The king fled Ava for Prome and died there in July 1468.

== Ancestry and early life ==
Narapati was born to Mohnyin Thado, then Governor of Mohnyin, and his wife (later chief queen) Shin Myat Hla on 7 June 1413. (Note: Zatadawbon Yazawin (Zata 1960: 46, 76) says he was born on Wednesday, 9th nekkhat (10th day) of the 4th month (1st Waso) of 765 ME, which translates to Wednesday, 13 June 1403. But 1403 is a typographical error as his parents were not married until late 1409/early 1410 per Hmannan Yazawin (Hmannan Vol. 2 2003: 81). (Hmannan Vol. 2 2003: 99) instead suggests he was born in year 775 ME, or 10th waxing of Waso 775 ME (Wednesday, 7 June 1413).) He was the second child of the couple's four children. He has an elder brother and two younger sisters. He was given Wuntho in fief.

Ancestry of King Narapati I

8. Min Pale of Paukmyaing
4. Saw Diga of Mye-Ne
9. Shwe Einthe of Paukmyaing
2. Mohnyin Thado
10. Saw Mun Nit of Nyaungyan
5. Saw Pale of Nyaungyan
11. unnamed
1. Narapati I
12. Thihapate I of Taungdwin
6. Thihapate II of Taungdwin
13. unnamed
3. Shin Myat Hla of Ava
14. unnamed
7. Unnamed
15. unnamed

== Viceroy of Prome ==
In 1429, he was appointed by his father, who had become king of Ava, Viceroy of Prome (Pyay), the southernmost and most important territory of Ava. His new title was Thihathu. He continued to rule Prome when his father died in 1439, and was succeeded by his brother and heir-apparent Minye Kyawswa.

== Accession ==
In January 1442, Minye Kyawswa suddenly died. At that time, Ava's forces had been laying siege to Mogaung, the capital of the Shan State of Mogaung. When the king died, the ministers at Ava first chose Minye Kyawswa's son-in-law and brother-in-law Thihapate who was at the front at Mogaung. Thihapate was recalled to Ava by ministers to assume the throne, but he declined the offer, declaring that he was neither a son nor a brother of the deceased king. He suggested they recall the king’s brother Thihathu from Prome. The ministers then invited Thihathu who arrived at Ava on 11 March 1442, (Note: (Yazawin Thit Vol. 2 2012: 284): Beginning of the month of Kason, 804 ME = Sunday, 11 March 1442) and formally ascended to the throne with the reign name of Narapati on 6 April 1442. (Note: (Yazawin Thit Vol. 1 2012: 285, and footnote 2): Date of coronation (Friday, 12th waning of Kason 804 ME) per a contemporary inscription at the Htupayon Pagoda founded by the king himself. The editors of the 1798 Yazawin Thit chronicle (Yazawin Thit Vol. 1 2012: 285, footnote 1) translated the date as 6 May 1442 which was a Sunday, not Friday as per the inscription. The reason for this error seems to be that the editors treated the previous year 803 ME as a great leap year, which added a leap day and a leap month. If 803 ME was a regular year, then the inscription date (Friday, 12th waning of Kason 804 ME) correctly translates to Friday, 6 April 1442. The 1724 Maha Yazawin Chronicle (Maha Yazawin Vol. 2 2006: 75) says that Narapati's coronation was on Friday, 1st waning of Kason 804 ME [sic], which is a copying error for the following reasons: (1) 804 ME did not begin until the 5th waning of Late Kason; and (2) 1st waning of Kason 803 ME did not fall on a Friday but on Monday, 26 March 1442. (The editors of the chronicle (Maha Yazawin Vol. 2 2006: 75, footnote 1) erroneously translated "1st waning of Kason 804 ME" to 25 April 1442, which was a Wednesday.) The 1832 Hmannan Yazawin chronicle (Hmannan Vol. 2 2003: 82) follows the Maha Yazawin's date of 1st waning of Kason, 804 ME instead of Yazawin Thit's inscription-supported date.) Thihapate, having refused the throne, went back to the front, and captured Mogaung the very same day, the new king, who was also Thihapate's brother-in-law, ascended the throne. Their leader Thonganbwa was captured, and brought back to Ava.

== Reign ==
As customary with all Ava kings, Narapati after becoming king, first had to assert his rule over the kingdom. With Mogaung defeated, Narapati gained the allegiance of the saopha of Onpaung Hsipaw (Thibaw) in the northeast. He made Thihapate the new saopha of Mohnyin, and his son-in-law the new saopha of Kale. Despite his success in peripheral regions, Narapati continued to have problems with regions much closer to Ava. In late 1443, he sent his armies to Yamethin and Pinle, both of which had been in revolt since the start of his brother's reign in 1441. While his armies were laying siege to Pinle, the new king was forced to deal with a far larger threat from the north: China.

=== Ming invasions ===
The Ming Chinese had conquered Yunnan after their campaigns of 1380–1388, but never completely controlled the frontier which was still occupied by several Shan States. The Chinese were forced to send troops back to the region due to the constant Shan raids into Yunnan by Thonganbwa, the saopha of Mogaung. In 1443, Zhengtong Emperor sent yet another expeditionary force (third campaign since 1436) to punish the pesky Shan raiders. After learning that Ava had already defeated and captured Thonganbwa at Mogaung, the Chinese forces, encamped at the frontier, demanded that Ava surrender Thonganbwa, and send a payment of tribute, or it would face attack.

Narapati refused the Chinese demand. In 1444, Ava forces marched north to meet the Chinese. The Burmese Chronicles report that the Chinese forces numbered three million, and that the Ava forces numbered 200,000. The numbers clearly were an exaggeration but an exaggeration that does indicate a grave threat. (Noted historian of Burmese history, GE Harvey, believes that the military numbers reported during the Ava-Pegu era were an order of magnitude higher.) Chinese troops descended on Bhamo, and war broke out. The Burmese met the invaders at Kaungton near Bhamo and held their ground. The Chinese soon faced a food supply problem, and retreated to Mong Wan (Mo Wun). Narapati appointed the saophas of Mogaung and Mong Nai (Mone) to watch over Bhamo and returned to Ava.

The Chinese forces, having regrouped, invaded again in the following year. On 3 November 1445, (Tuesday, 3rd waxing of Nadaw 807 ME), the Burmese troops evacuated Bhamo. The Chinese forces penetrated all the way down to the fortified city of Ava, and threatened to attack if Thonganbwa was not handed over to them. Narapati negotiated a deal to hand over Thonganbwa if the Chinese helped him subdue Yamethin first. The Chinese agreed, and together with a contingent of troops from Ava, conquered Yamethin. Thonganbwa, rather than being handed over to the Chinese, committed suicide. His dead body was handed over to the Chinese in early 1446. Narapati maintained that he did not accept Chinese suzerainty. But the Chinese considered the handover of the body as Ava's recognition of Chinese suzerainty.

=== Mohnyin rebellion (1450) ===
The death of Thonganbwa did not solve the problem of Shan raids for the Chinese. The Maw Shans, now under the leadership of Thokyeinbwa (Chinese: Si Ji-fa), son of Thonganbwa, moved to the region west of Mogaung, and continued the raids into both Ava and Yunnan territories. In 1448, the Chinese chased them to near Bhamo but were defeated by the Shans.

In 1450, the Burman saopha of Mohnyin, Thihapate, died. Thihapate's son Min U Ti in alliance with Maw Shan raiders Thokyeinbwa and Thopawbwa (Si Bu-fa) raised a rebellion. Narapati sent an army under the command of the crown prince to Mohnyin. The rebel leader Min U Ti was executed. The two Shan leaders then surrendered and took an oath of allegiance. Narapati made a son of Thopawbwa the new saopha of Mohnyin. He kept Thokyeinbwa and Thopawbwa at Ava. In 1454, Narapati handed over Thokyeinbwa over six people including Thokyeinbwa and his family at a village on the Irrawaddy in exchange for China's explicit recognition of Ava's control of Mohnyin. (Note: Mohnyin had been under Ava's control since 1406. (Fernquest 2006): The Nanzhao Chronicle of Yunnan claims that the Ming recognized Mohnyin as Avan territory in 1452, not 1454. Thokyeinbwa arrived at Beijing in a cage on 30 August 1454 and was executed on 2 September 1454.)

=== Toungoo rebellion (1452–1459) ===
In 1452, Viceroy of Toungoo Minkhaung I was assassinated, and the town entered a state of rebellion against Ava. Narapati tried in vain to recover the territory but could not. However, the rebellious Toungoo king was assassinated by his servant in 1459 (821 ME). Ava regained nominal control. Narapati gave his brother-in-law who already had Taungdwingyi as an appanage to rule Toungoo.

== Death ==
On 12 June 1467 (12th waxing of Waso 829 ME), Narapati was stabbed by his grandson whom he had reproved for a love intrigue with his cousin; the wound was not mortal. The king fled to Prome in where his son Mingyi Swa was governor. He died there a year later on 24 July 1468.

== Bibliography ==
- Fernquest, Jon (Autumn 2006). "Crucible of War: Burma and the Ming in the Tai Frontier Zone (1382–1454)" (PDF). SOAS Bulletin of Burma Research. 4 (2). Archived from the original (PDF) on 2009-02-19.
- Harvey, G. E. (1925). History of Burma: From the Earliest Times to 10 March 1824. London: Frank Cass & Co. Ltd.
- Htin Aung, Maung (1967). A History of Burma. New York and London: Cambridge University Press.
- Phayre, Lt. Gen. Sir Arthur P. (1883). History of Burma (1967 ed.). London: Susil Gupta.
- Royal Historians of Burma (c. 1680). U Hla Tin (Hla Thamein) (ed.). Zatadawbon Yazawin (1960 ed.). Historical Research Directorate of the Union of Burma.
- Royal Historical Commission of Burma (1832). Hmannan Yazawin (in Burmese). Vol. 1–3 (2003 ed.). Yangon: Ministry of Information, Myanmar.

Narapati I of Ava Ava Kingdom Born: 7 June 1413 Died: 24 July 1468
Regnal titles
Preceded by Minye Kyawswa I	King of Ava by 11 March 1442 – 24 July 1468	Succeeded by Thihathura I
Royal titles
Preceded by Min Maha of Prome as governor	Viceroy of Prome; 1429–1442	Succeeded by Minye Kyawswa II of Prome as governor
