= U Kala =

Burmese historian

- ဦးကုလား
- Born: 1678; Singu village, Toungoo Dynasty
- Died: 1738 (aged 59–60)
- Occupation: Historian
- Known for: Compiling the Maha Yazawin
- Parent(s): Deva Setha (father); Mani Ogha (mother)

U Kala (Burmese: ဦးကုလား) was a Burmese historian and chronicler best known for compiling the Maha Yazawin (lit. 'Great Royal Chronicle'), the first extensive national chronicle of Burma. U Kala single-handedly revolutionized secular Burmese historiography and ushered in a new generation of private chroniclers, including Buddhist monks and laymen.

U Kala was a wealthy descendant of court and regional administrative officers from both sides of his family. His father, Dewa Setha, was a banker from Singaing, a village south of Inwa, and descended from regional administrative officers (myosas) of the crown. His mother, Mani Awga, of mixed Shan and Burman noble descent, came from a prominent family of courtier-administrators who served the Taungoo Dynasty since the mid-1500s.

In compiling the Maha Yazawin, U Kala likely had access to Toungoo court documents, including royal correspondence, parabaik, notebooks of daily court schedules prepared by astrologers and scribes, official records of military affairs, and royal genealogies. He supplemented his sources with private local chronicles, inscriptions, biographies, and religious histories held in monastic or royal collections at the royal capital.
