= Min Phyu of Toungoo =

Min Phyu မင်းဖြူ

Queen of the Southern Palace
- Tenure: c. 5 May [O.S. 25 April] 1583 – 4 May [O.S. 24 April] 1596
- Predecessor: Sanda Dewi (Chief Queen)
- Successor: Hanthawaddy Mibaya (Chief Queen)
- Born: in or after 1552 (Note: Per (Hmannan Vol. 3 2003: 81), Min Phyu had two elder brothers. Since her eldest brother Minye Thihathu II of Toungoo was born in August 1550, she could have been born in 1552 at the earliest.); Toungoo (Taungoo)
- Died: 4 May [O.S. 24 April] 1596; Saturday, 9th waxing of Kason 958 ME (Note: The three main chronicles do not agree on her date of death; only Hmannan's date matches with its Western calendar translation. (Maha Yazawin Vol. 3 2006: 96) says she died on Sunday, 9th waxing of Kason 958 ME, which translates to Saturday, 4 May 1596. (Yazawin Thit Vol. 2 2012: 230) corrects Maha Yazawin, saying she died on Saturday, 9th waxing of Kason 957 ME, which translates to Sunday, 16 April 1595. (Hmannan Vol. 3 2003: 98) corrects both prior chronicles with Saturday, 9th waxing of Kason 958 ME, which results in Saturday, 4 May 1596.); Pegu (Bago)
- Burial: 5 May 1596; Kanbawzathadi Palace
- Spouse: Nanda
- Issue: none
- Father: Minkhaung II of Toungoo
- Mother: Laygyun Mibaya
- Religion: Theravada Buddhism

Min Phyu (Burmese: မင်းဖြူ, [mɪ́ɴ bjù]; 1550s–1596) was a principal queen consort of King Nanda of Toungoo Dynasty of Myanmar (Burma) from 1583 to 1596. The eldest daughter of Viceroy Minkhaung II of Toungoo, along with her two younger sisters Min Htwe and Min Pu, married her first cousin Nanda in 1583. The marriages of state solidified the ties between Minkhaung II and Nanda, the High King.

Her official style, according to the Maha Yazawin and Hmannan Yazawin chronicles, was "Queen of the Southern Palace" although she was not the chief queen sort, making her one of the few Queens of the Southern Palace who was not also the chief queen. The Yazawin Thit chronicle demurs, conspicuously omitting her specific rank. At any rate, all three chronicles say that she was given a burial at Kanbawzathadi Palace, with the burial rites befitting a chief queen. She had no issue.

== In popular culture ==
She was portrayed as a character in Thai television drama many stories namely The Legend of King Naresuan: The Series Portrayed by Nussara Prawanna., and appeared in the scene of In Part 1 of the 2007 King Naresuan film series, which she side seated of king Nanda Bayin.

== Ancestry ==
The queen was descended from the Prome and ultimately Ava royalty from her mother's side. Her father Minkhaung was a half-brother of King Bayinnaung.

Ancestry of Queen Min Phyu

8. Taungkha Min
4. Mingyi Swe
9. Kayenawaddy
2. Minkhaung II of Toungoo
10. Kywe Sit Min
5. Sister of Shin Myo Myat
11. (unnamed)
1. Min Phyu
12. Thado Minsaw of Prome
6. Bayin Htwe of Prome
13. Myat Hpone Pyo
3. Laygyun Mibaya
14. Minye Kyawswa II of Kalay
7. Chit Mi of Prome
15. Min Hpone Htut of Prome

== Bibliography ==
- Kala, U (1724). Maha Yazawin (in Burmese). Vol. 1–3 (2006, 4th printing ed.). Yangon: Ya-Pyei Publishing.
- Maha Sithu (1798). Myint Swe; Kyaw Win; Thein Hlaing (eds.). Yazawin Thit (in Burmese). Vol. 1–3 (2012, 2nd printing ed.). Yangon: Ya-Pyei Publishing.
- Royal Historical Commission of Burma (1832). Hmannan Yazawin (in Burmese). Vol. 1–3 (2003 ed.). Yangon: Ministry of Information, Myanmar.

Min Phyu of Toungoo Toungoo Dynasty Born: 1550s Died: 4 May 1596
Royal titles
Preceded by Sanda Dewi as Chief Queen	Queen of the Southern Palace c. 5 May 1583 – 4 May 1596	Succeeded by Hanthawaddy Mibaya as Chief Queen
