= Minkhaung (disambiguation) =

Minkhaung (also spelled Mingaung or Minhkaung) was a Burmese royal title, and may refer to:

== Monarchs ==
- Minkhaung I, King of Ava, r. 1400–1421
- Minkhaung II, King of Ava, r. 1480–1501
- Minkhaung of Mrauk-U, King of Mrauk-U, r. 1521–1531
- Minkhaung of Prome, King of Prome, r. 1539–1542

== Royalty ==
- Minkhaung Medaw of Ava, Princess of Ava, 1367–?
- Minkhaung Medaw, Queen consort of Pegu, r. 1535–1539; Queen consort of Mrauk-U, r. 1540–1554
- Minkhaung I of Toungoo, Viceroy of Toungoo, r. 1446–1451
- Minkhaung II of Toungoo, Viceroy of Toungoo, r. 1549–1584

== Military personnel ==
- Minkhaung Nawrahta, Konbaung-era general, 1752–1760
- "Teingya" Minkhaung, Konbaung-era general, 1752–1769

== Other uses ==
- Taungoo Mingaung, one of the Thirty Seven nats
