= Thiri Yaza Dewi =

Thiri Yaza Dewi သီရိရာဇဒေဝီ

Queen of the Northern Palace
- Tenure: c. 5 May [O.S. 25 April] 1583 – 19 December [O.S. 9 December] 1599
- Predecessor: Sanda Dewi
- Successor: Sanda Dewi of Ava
- Born: in or after 1554 (Note: Per (Hmannan Vol. 3 2003: 81), Min Pu had two elder brothers and two elder sisters. Since her eldest brother Minye Thihathu II of Toungoo was born in August 1550, the earliest year she could have been born in was 1554.); Toungoo (Taungoo)
- Died: 1600s (after 21 November 1602 and before 4 September 1610); Ava (Inwa)
- Spouse: Nanda (1583–1600); Minye Thihathu III of Toungoo (1602–160?)
- Issue: Min Shwe-Don
- Father: Minkhaung II of Toungoo
- Mother: Laygyun Mibaya
- Religion: Theravada Buddhism

Thiri Yaza Dewi (Burmese: သီရိရာဇဒေဝီ, pronounced [θìɹḭ jàza̰ dèwì]; Pali: Sirirājadevī) personal name "Khin Hpone Thut" ခင်ဘုန်းထွဋ် was a principal queen consort of King Nanda of Toungoo Dynasty of Myanmar (Burma) from 1583 to 1599. The youngest daughter of Viceroy Minkhaung II of Toungoo, along with her two sisters Min Phyu and Min Htwe, married her first cousin Nanda in 1583. The marriages of state solidified the ties between Minkhaung II and Nanda, the High King. At Pegu (Bago), she became the Queen of the Northern Palace.

The queen lost her office in 1599 when Nanda surrendered to the forces of her brother Minye Thihathu II of Toungoo and Raza II of Mrauk-U. She was part of the defeated royal family that was brought back to her native Toungoo (Taungoo) in 1600. (Note: (Maha Yazawin Vol. 3 2006: 100): The defeated royal family arrived at Toungoo on 3 March 1600 (5th waning of Tabaung 961 ME).) She became a widow on 30 November 1600 when her nephew Natshinnaung assassinated Nanda. On 21 November 1602, Minye Thihathu II married her off to his third son (and her nephew) Minye Thihathu III of Toungoo, who was at least 20 years, perhaps even 25 years, her junior. (Note: Minye Thihathu was born no earlier than 1581, given that his eldest brother Natshinnaung was born c. December 1578, and followed by another elder brother, Minye Kyawswa of Toungoo.) On the same day, her only daughter, Min Shwe-Don, was married to her nephew (and her new husband's younger brother), Minye Kyawhtin II of Kawliya.

She apparently died sometime in the next eight years. (Note: She was not part of the exiled royals, which King Anaukpetlun sent to Ava in September 1610 per (Maha Yazawin Vol. 3 2006: 141). Had she been alive, she certainly should have been part of the group, which included her sister Min Htwe as well as Min Taya Medaw and Natshin Medaw.)

== Ancestry ==
The queen was descended from the Prome and ultimately Ava royalty from her mother's side. Her father Minkhaung was a half-brother of King Bayinnaung. Her personal name was Min Pu.

Ancestry of Queen Thiri Yaza Dewi

8. Taungkha Min
4. Mingyi Swe
9. Kayenawaddy
2. Minkhaung II of Toungoo
10. Kywe Sit Min
5. Sister of Shin Myo Myat
11. (unnamed)
1. Thiri Yaza Dewi
12. Thado Minsaw of Prome
6. Bayin Htwe of Prome
13. Myat Hpone Pyo
3. Laygyun Mibaya
14. Minye Kyawswa II of Kalay
7. Chit Mi of Prome
15. Min Hpone Htut of Prome

== Bibliography ==
- Kala, U (1724). Maha Yazawin (in Burmese). Vol. 1–3 (2006, 4th printing ed.). Yangon: Ya-Pyei Publishing.
- Royal Historical Commission of Burma (1832). Hmannan Yazawin (in Burmese). Vol. 1–3 (2003 ed.). Yangon: Ministry of Information, Myanmar.

Thiri Yaza Dewi Toungoo Dynasty Born: 1550s Died: 1600s
Royal titles
Preceded by Sanda Dewi	Queen of the Northern Palace c. 5 May 1583 – 19 December 1599	Succeeded by Sanda Dewi of Ava
