= Laygyun Mibaya =

Laygyun Mibaya လေးကျွန်း မိဖုရား

Chief vicereine of Toungoo
- Tenure: March 1549 – 30 April 1550; 6 June 1552 – June 1584
- Predecessor: Sister of Shin Myo Myat
- Successor: Min Khin Saw

Queen consort of Toungoo
- Tenure: by 1535–1545
- Born: 1520s Prome (Pyay)
- Died: c. 1580s Toungoo (Taungoo)
- Spouse: Tabinshwehti (1535–1545); Minkhaung II of Toungoo (1545–1584?)
- Issue: Minye Thihathu II; Thado Dhamma Yaza; Min Phyu; Thiri Yaza Dewi; Min Htwe
- House: Prome
- Father: Bayin Htwe
- Mother: Chit Mi of Prome
- Religion: Theravada Buddhism

Laygyun Mibaya (Burmese: လေးကျွန်း မိဖုရား, pronounced [lé d͡ʑʊ́ɰ̃ mḭbəjá]) was the chief queen of Viceroy Minkhaung II of Toungoo (r. 1549–1550, 1552–1584). Self-proclaimed kings of Toungoo Minye Thihathu II and Natshinnaung were her son and grandson, respectively.

Born to the Prome royalty (and ultimately descended from the Ava royalty), she was married off to King Tabinshwehti of Toungoo Dynasty by her half-brother King Narapati of Prome in the 1530s. At Toungoo (Taungoo), she became a minor queen, living off the palace in a house located in the Laygyun Garden. She came to be known as Laygyun Mibaya (lit. "Queen of Laygyun"). In 1545, Tabinshwehti married his minor queen off to Zeya Nanda, who would later be known as Minkhaung II.

She had five children all by Minkhaung II. Her eldest son Minye Thihathu II married his first cousin Min Khin Saw, daughter of King Bayinnaung and Queen Sanda Dewi. All three of her daughters were married to their first cousin King Nanda in 1582.

== Ancestry ==
The following is her ancestry as reported in the Hmannan Yazawin chronicle, which in turn referenced contemporary inscriptions. (Note: See (Hmannan Vol. 3 2003: 80) for the names of her maternal grandparents. See (Hmannan Vol. 2 2003: 82–84) for further ancestors.)

Ancestry of Laygyun Mibaya

8. Narapati of Ava
4. Thado Minsaw of Prome
9. Atula Thiri Maha Yaza Dewi of Ava
2. Bayin Htwe
10. Saw Shwe Khet of Prome
5. Myat Hpone Pyo
11. Saw Min Phyu
1. Laygyun Mibaya
12. Minye Kyawswa I of Kalay
6. Minye Kyawswa II of Kalay
13. unnamed
3. Chit Mi of Prome
14. Mingyi Swa of Prome
7. Min Hpone Htut of Prome
15. Saw Myat Lay

== Bibliography ==
- Kala, U (1724). Maha Yazawin (in Burmese). Vol. 1–3 (2006, 4th printing ed.). Yangon: Ya-Pyei Publishing.
- Maha Sithu (1798). Myint Swe; Kyaw Win; Thein Hlaing (eds.). Yazawin Thit (in Burmese). Vol. 1–3 (2012, 2nd printing ed.). Yangon: Ya-Pyei Publishing.
- Royal Historical Commission of Burma (1832). Hmannan Yazawin (in Burmese). Vol. 1–3 (2003 ed.). Yangon: Ministry of Information, Myanmar.

Laygyun Mibaya Toungoo Dynasty Born: c. 1520s Died: c. 1580s
Royal titles
Preceded by Sister of Shin Myo Myat	Chief vicereine of Toungoo; 1549–1550, 1552–1584	Succeeded by Min Khin Saw
