= Min Htwe of Toungoo =

Min Htwe မင်းထွေး

Queen of the Central Palace
- Tenure: c. 5 May [O.S. 25 April] 1583 – 19 December [O.S. 9 December] 1599
- Predecessor: Yaza Dewi of Pegu
- Successor: Yaza Dewi of Ava
- Born: in or after 1553 (Note: Per (Hmannan Vol. 3 2003: 81), Min Htwe had two elder brothers and an elder sister. Since her eldest brother Minye Thihathu II of Toungoo was born in August 1550, the earliest year she could have been born in was 1553.); Toungoo (Taungoo)
- Died: in or after 1611; Ava (Inwa)
- Spouse: Nanda (1583–1600); Minye Kyawswa of Toungoo (1602–1612)
- Issue: none
- Father: Minkhaung II of Toungoo
- Mother: Laygyun Mibaya
- Religion: Theravada Buddhism

Min Htwe (Burmese: မင်းထွေး, [mɪ́ɴ tʰwé]) was a principal queen consort of King Nanda of Toungoo Dynasty of Myanmar (Burma) from 1583 to 1599. The second daughter of Viceroy Minkhaung II of Toungoo, along with her two sisters Min Phyu and Min Pu, married her first cousin Nanda in 1583. The marriages of state solidified the ties between Minkhaung II and Nanda, the High King. At Pegu (Bago), she became the Queen of the Central Palace.

Htwe lost her office in 1599 when Nanda surrendered to the forces of her brother Minye Thihathu II of Toungoo and Raza II of Mrauk-U. She was part of the defeated royal family that was brought back to her native Toungoo (Taungoo) in 1600. (Note: (Maha Yazawin Vol. 3 2006: 100): The defeated royal family arrived at Toungoo on 3 March 1600 (5th waning of Tabaung 961 ME).) She became a widow on 30 November 1600 when her nephew Natshinnaung assassinated Nanda. On 21 November 1602, Minye Thihathu II married her off to his second son (and her nephew) Minye Kyawswa of Toungoo, who was at least 20 years, perhaps even 25 years, her junior. (Note: Minye Kyawswa was born no earlier than 1580, given that his eldest brother Natshinnaung was born c. December 1578.)

She remained at Toungoo until 1610 when King Anaukpetlun, who had captured Toungoo, sent her, along with other royals, to his capital Ava (Inwa). At Ava, she was given a retinue and a residence befitting a Queen of the Central Palace on 4 January [O.S. 25 December 1610] 1611. It is unclear if she and her nephew and husband Minye Kyawswa remained married. She did not follow Minye Kyawswa to Kyaukmaw where he was appointed governor-general. Minye Kyawswa died in August 1612 in a battle with the forces of Portuguese Syriam.

The queen had no issue.

== Ancestry ==
The queen was descended from the Prome and ultimately Ava royalty from her mother's side. Her father Minkhaung was a half-brother of King Bayinnaung.

Ancestry of Queen Min Htwe

8. Taungkha Min
4. Mingyi Swe
9. Kayenawaddy
2. Minkhaung II of Toungoo
10. Kywe Sit Min
5. Sister of Shin Myo Myat
11. (unnamed)
1. Min Phyu
12. Thado Minsaw of Prome
6. Bayin Htwe of Prome
13. Myat Hpone Pyo
3. Laygyun Mibaya
14. Minye Kyawswa II of Kalay
7. Chit Mi of Prome
15. Min Hpone Htut of Prome

== Bibliography ==
- Kala, U (1724). Maha Yazawin (in Burmese). Vol. 1–3 (2006, 4th printing ed.). Yangon: Ya-Pyei Publishing.
- Royal Historical Commission of Burma (1832). Hmannan Yazawin (in Burmese). Vol. 1–3 (2003 ed.). Yangon: Ministry of Information, Myanmar.

Min Htwe of Toungoo Toungoo Dynasty Born: 1550s Died: c. 1610s
Royal titles
Preceded by Yaza Dewi of Pegu	Queen of the Central Palace c. 5 May 1583 – 19 December 1599	Succeeded by Yaza Dewi of Ava
