= Khin Ma Hnaung =

Khin Ma Hnaung ခင်မနှောင်း

Queen of the Northern Palace of Arakan
- Tenure: 19 December [O.S. 9 December] 1599 – 4 July [O.S. 24 June] 1612
- Predecessor: Pyinsala Sanda
- Successor: Shin Htwe
- Born: 1565; Pegu (Bago)
- Died: late 1630? Mrauk-U
- Spouse: Raza II
- Issue: Pan Thida(daughter)
- House: Toungoo
- Father: Nanda
- Mother: Hanthawaddy Mibaya
- Religion: Theravada Buddhism

Khin Ma Hnaung (Burmese: ခင်မနှောင်း, [kʰɪ̀ɴ ma̰ n̥áʊɴ]) was a queen consort of King Raza II of Arakan from 1599 to 1612. The queen was a daughter of King Nanda of Toungoo Dynasty and his chief consort Hanthawaddy Mibaya. She was taken to Mrauk-U, after her father surrendered to the joint forces of Raza II and Minye Thihathu II of Toungoo in 1599. At Mrauk-U, she was known as the Tanzaung Mibara (တန်ဆောင်း မိဖုရား, "Queen of the Royal Hall").

== Family ==
The queen has a daughter named Thupa-Ba Déwi (သုပဘာ ဒေဝီ) whose personal name was Pan Thida, born in the year 1603 right after lost image of Buddha was founded by fishermens and they notified the King. Which Buddha image was traced back to the timeline during reign of Mahataing Sanda who was the founder of Waithali Kingdom, his queen was Thubapa Déwi who ordered the Buddha Statue retrieved from India. On its way to the capital, raft carrying the statue accidentally sunken and was lost. However, the queen asked her husband to make copy of The Great Vesali Image.

Original Statue was now preserved and the King Raza II accompanied by his retinue and ministers along with his pregnant wife. He named his newborn baby princess linking her to the story of the queen and the lost image of Buddha.

Sadistic queen consort often felt homesickness to her homeland, so she erected pagoda dedicated to her homeland of Pegu. The pagoda which now sits at the Kyein Hill in modern day Minbya called Khin Ma Hnaung Lwan Seti.

== Ancestry ==
Khin Ma Hnaung was the fourth child of Nanda and his chief consort Hanthawaddy Mibaya. She was likely born in the early 1560s. (Note: Chronicles have no record of hers or any other female children of Nanda. Her elder brother Mingyi Swa, the third child of her parents, was born on 27 November 1558 (Sunday, 2nd waning of Nadaw 920 ME) per (Ohn Shwe 1966: xxviii). Her younger brother Minye Kyawswa II of Ava, the sixth child, was born in November 1567 (Nadaw 929 ME) per (Zata 1960: 47). It means she was born sometime between late 1559 and 1565. Moreover, because her father was away on various military campaigns between February 1563 and August 1565, she and her younger sister Khin Pu were likely born in the early 1560s.)

Ancestry of Khin Ma Hnaung

8. Mingyi Swe
4. Bayinnaung
9. Shin Myo Myat
2. Nanda
10. Mingyi Nyo
5. Atula Thiri
11. Yadana Dewi
1. Khin Ma Hnaung
12. Mingyi Nyo
6. Tabinshwehti
13. Yaza Dewi
3. Hanthawaddy Mibaya
14. Mingyi Swe
7. Dhamma Dewi
15. Shin Myo Myat

== In popular culture ==
She is the very prominent character of thai television dramas jomjai ayothaya (จอมใจอโยธยา) in 2025 in name chao nang miang Portrayed by Chawanrat Jenchitranon.

== Bibliography ==
- Ohn Shwe, U; Natshinnaung (1920). Natshinnaung Yadu Collection (in Burmese) (1966, 3rd printing ed.). Yangon: Hanthawaddy.
- Royal Historians of Burma (c. 1680). U Hla Tin (Hla Thamein) (ed.). Zatadawbon Yazawin (1960 ed.). Historical Research Directorate of the Union of Burma.
- Royal Historical Commission of Burma (1832). Hmannan Yazawin (in Burmese). Vol. 1–3 (2003 ed.). Yangon: Ministry of Information, Myanmar.
- Sandamala Linkara, Ashin (1931). Rakhine Razawin Thit (in Burmese). Vol. 1–2 (1997–1999 ed.). Yangon: Tetlan Sarpay.

Khin Ma Hnaung Mrauk-U Kingdom Born: 1560s Died: 1620s?
Royal titles
Preceded by Pyinsala Sanda	Queen of the Northern Palace; 19 December 1599 – 4 July 1612	Succeeded by Shin Htwe
