= Minye Thihathu =

Minye Thihathu is a Burmese royal title, and may refer to:

- Thihathu of Ava, King of Ava 1421–1425
- Mingyi Swe, Minye Thihathu, Viceroy of Toungoo 1540–1549
- Minye Thihathu II of Toungoo, Viceroy of Toungoo 1584–1597; King of Toungoo (1597–1609)

== See also ==
- Burmese royal titles
