= Nanda Bayin =

King of the Toungoo dynasty of Burma from 1581 to 1599

Nanda Bayin; နန္ဒဘုရင်
- King of Toungoo

King of Burma: Pegu (1581–99); Ava and Shan states (1581–97); Toungoo (1581–97); Prome (1581–95); Manipur (1581–93)
- Reign: 10 October 1581 – 19 December 1599
- Coronation: 15 October 1581
- Predecessor: Bayinnaung
- Successor: Nyaungyan
- Chief Minister: Binnya Kyanhtaw

Suzerain of Lan Na
- Reign: 10 October 1581 – c. February 1597
- Predecessor: Bayinnaung
- Successor: Naresuan
- King: Nawrahta Minsaw

Suzerain of Siam
- Reign: 10 October 1581 – 3 May 1584
- Predecessor: Bayinnaung
- Successor: Disestablished
- King: Maha Thammarachathirat

Suzerain of Lan Xang
- Reign: 10 October 1581 – 19 December 1599 (Note: Lan Xang did not formally renounce tributary ties with Burma until 1603 per (Stuart-Fox 2008: 38). But it was de facto independent by 1597.)
- Predecessor: Bayinnaung
- Successor: Disestablished
- King: Maha Ouparat (1581–88); Sen Soulintha (1588–91); Nokeo Koumane (1591–95); Vorapita (1596–99)
- Born: 9 November 1535; Tuesday, Full moon of Tazaungmon 897 ME; Toungoo (Taungoo)
- Died: 30 November 1600 (aged 65); Thursday, 10th waning of Tazaungmon 962 ME; Toungoo
- Burial: 1 December 1600; Toungoo Palace
- Spouse: Hanthawaddy Mibaya; Min Phyu; Min Htwe; Thiri Yaza Dewi; Min Taya Medaw
- Issue among others...: Mingyi Swa; Minye Kyawswa II of Ava; Khin Ma Hnaung; Thado Dhamma Yaza III; Maung Saw Pru
- House: Toungoo
- Father: Bayinnaung
- Mother: Atula Thiri aka Thakin Gyi
- Religion: Theravada Buddhism

Nanda Bayin (Burmese: နန္ဒ ဘုရင်, pronounced [nàɰ̃da̰ bəjɪ̀ɰ̃]; Thai: นันทบุเรง, RTGS: Nantha Bureng; 9 November 1535 – 30 November [O.S. 20 November] 1600) was king of the Toungoo dynasty of Burma (Myanmar) from 1581 to 1599. He presided over the collapse of the First Toungoo Empire.

The eldest son of King Bayinnaung was one of the principal commanders in his father's military campaigns that expanded and defended the empire. As king, Nanda faced the impossible task of keeping his father's "improbable domain" together. He never gained the full support of his father's chosen vassal rulers, who governed what used to be sovereign kingdoms just a few decades earlier. Within the first three years of his reign, both Upper Burma and Siam revolted. Though he could never raise more than a third of his father's troop levels, Nanda could not come to terms with a smaller empire. Between 1584 and 1593, he launched five disastrous invasions of Siam, which increasingly weakened his hold everywhere else. From 1593 onward, it was he who was on the defensive, unable to stop a Siamese invasion that seized the entire Tenasserim coast in 1594–95, or prevent the rest of the vassals from breaking away in 1597. In 1599, Nanda surrendered to the joint forces of Toungoo and Arakan, and was taken prisoner to Toungoo. A year later, he was assassinated by Natshinnaung.

Nanda was an energetic king, who probably would have made an "above average" Burmese monarch. But he made the mistake of trying to hold on to an "absurdly overextended" empire built mainly on patron-client relationships. The king's monumental failures taught his 17th-century successors not to overextend their realm and to implement a more centralized administrative system. The Restored Toungoo administrative reforms, which with Konbaung modifications, would last to the end of Burmese monarchy in 1885, had their origins in the failures of Nanda Bayin.

== Early life ==
=== Ancestry ===
Nanda was born to Princess Thakin Gyi and General Kyawhtin Nawrahta (later known as Bayinnaung) at the Toungoo Palace on 9 November 1535. (Note: (Hmannan Vol. 3 2003: 61, 106): Nanda ascended to the throne on the full moon day of Tazaungmon 943 ME (10 October 1581) at age 46 (in his 47th year). It means he was born on or before the full moon of Tazaungmon 897 ME (9 November 1535). But (Hmannan Vol. 3 2003: 240, 248) says he was still 12 years old (in his 13th year) on 13th waxing of Tazaungmon 910 (13 October 1548) at the start of the 1548 Siamese campaign. It means he was born between 14th waxing of Tazaungmon 897 ME and the full moon of Tazaungmon 897 ME (8 November or 9 November 1535). Per (Hmannan Vol. 3 2003: 106) he was born on a Tuesday. It means he was born on 9 November 1535 (Tuesday, full moon of Tazaungmon 897 ME).) The prince hailed from Pagan and Pinya royal lines, and was a grandson of King Mingyi Nyo and nephew of King Tabinshwehti of Toungoo. (Note: See (Hmannan Vol. 2 2003: 172–173) his grandfather King Mingyi Nyo's ancestry.) He had one full elder sister, Inwa Mibaya. He was probably at least one quarter Shan. (Note: Chronicles generally do not mention the ethnicity of the royalty, and Nanda's was no exception. His ethnicity is inferred from the positions of his ancestors. His maternal grandmother Yadana Dewi was a princess of Mobye (Mong Pai), a Shan state. He also descended from King Thihathu, a half-Shan according to colonial period scholarship, and Shin Mi-Nauk of Mohnyin, a full Shan. However, (Aung-Thwin 1996) and (Aung-Thwin and Aung-Thwin 2012: 107–109) argue that it is a mistake to equate the position with ethnicity, and that colonial scholarship grafted on Shan ethnicity to the so-called Shan brothers without any evidence. Indeed, Mohnyin Thado was a Burman saopha of Mohnyin, and many ethnic Shans were governors of the Shwebo region, the Burman heartland. Nevertheless, the ruling clan of Mobye and Hsipaw produced kings Hkonmaing and Mobye Narapati, both of whom are accepted as Shan. Therefore, Nanda's maternal grandmother was probably of Shan ethnicity, and his mother Atula Thiri was at least 50% Shan.)

Ancestry of King Nanda

8. Taungkha Min
4. Mingyi Swe
9. Kayenawaddy
2. Bayinnaung
10. Kywesit Min
5. Shin Myo Myat
11. <unnamed>
1. Zeya Thiha Nanda
12. Maha Thinkhaya
6. Mingyi Nyo
13. Min Hla Nyet
3. Atula Thiri
14. Saopha of Mobye
7. Yadana Dewi
15. (unnamed)

=== Childhood and education ===
Except for the first three years of his life, he grew up at the Pegu Palace in Pegu, which became the new capital of the burgeoning Toungoo dynasty in 1539. Throughout his youth, his father was away on annual military campaigns with his uncle the king. Nanda nominally became the second in line to the Toungoo throne in 1542 when his father was made heir-apparent by Tabinshwehti. Like his father and uncle, who received a military style education in their youth, he as a Toungoo prince probably received the same kind of military oriented education. Indeed, Nanda was only 13 when he, styled as Zeya Thiha (ဇေယျသီဟ), accompanied his father and his uncle in their campaign in Siam. For his bravery at the battle of Ayutthaya, the young prince was awarded the title of Minye Kyawswa (မင်းရဲကျော်စွာ) by Tabinshwehti.

== Heir-apparent ==
=== Accession ===
On 11 January 1551, Nanda became heir-apparent of the kingdom after eight months of chaos following Tabinshwehti's assassination on 30 April 1550. When the news of the assassination reached Pegu, one of Bayinnaung's half-brothers Minkhaung II refused to recognize Bayinnaung as the rightful successor, and seized the throne. Nanda, his mother and his sister had to flee the city to join Bayinnaung who was away on a campaign in Dala (modern Yangon). There, Nanda became an active member of his father's inner circle who plotted to restore the Toungoo Empire. Bayinnaung's forces first attacked his native Toungoo in September 1550 and took the city on 11 January 1551. Bayinnaung held a coronation ceremony there, and made his 15-year-old son his heir-apparent. (Note: Chronicles (Maha Yazawin Vol. 2 2006: 201) do not explicitly say that Nanda became heir-apparent on Bayinnaung's coronation ceremony on 11 January 1551, in which the king handed out various titles to his brothers. But it assumed that he did as the chronicles refer to Nanda as Maha Upayaza (heir-apparent) on the very next page (Maha Yazawin Vol. 2 2006: 202).)

=== Military service ===
For the next 15 years, Bayinnaung directed his energies to restoring and expanding the Toungoo Empire. Everyone in his inner circle was devoted to the main enterprise of the kingdom: warfare. In the early years (1551 to 1555), however, Nanda, still a teenager, was given limited roles, and did not see any combat action. It was only 1557 onward that Nanda took on increasingly active and prominent roles in his father's military campaigns that founded the largest empire in Southeast Asia. Nanda, along with his uncles Thado Dhamma Yaza II, Minkhaung II and Thado Minsaw, became one of the four principal commanders of the king. Over the next decades, he grew to be an able military leader in his own right, and by the end of his father's reign, was leading entire campaigns by himself.

Military campaigns of Crown Prince Nanda (1551–80)
Campaign	Duration	Troops commanded	Notes
Prome	1551		Guarded Toungoo.
Pegu	1552	1 regiment	Did not see any action.
Ava	1553	14,000	His first big assignment, and as commander-in-chief to move the forward perimeter in the north against Ava Kingdom. His role was largely ceremonial since the two 7,000 strong armies were led by his uncles Thado Dhamma Yaza II and Minkhaung II, experienced generals. After seeing extensive defenses of Ava, the trio decided not to proceed. He guarded Pegu during the next Ava campaign (1554–55).
Ava	1554–55	?	Guarded Pegu.
Shan states	1557	12,000	Led an army. Along with Thado Minsaw's and Minkhaung II's armies, his army converged on to Thibaw, part of a three-pronged attack. Fought on elephant-back in the battle of Hsipaw.
Mone	1557	8000	Led an army with Binnya Dala as deputy but did not see any action. Thado Dhamma Yaza II's vanguard army took Mone.
Lan Na	1558	10 regiments 2 cavalry battalions	Led one of the three vanguard armies (alongside Thado Dhamma Yaza II, Thado Minsaw).
Mone	1558	10 regiments	He and Thado Minsaw returned to Mone from Lan Na and put down a rebellion by the saopha of Mone.
Trans-Salween Chinese Shan states	1563	12,000	Led one of the four armies that invaded the trans-Salween states. His army invaded from Momeik. Binnya Dala was again his deputy. Saw action at Maing Maw. Took Hotha, Latha, Kaingma, Mainglyin.
Siam	1563–64	14,000	He and Minkhaung II jointly-attacked and conquered Sukhothai in December 1563. Attacked the fort defending Ayutthaya.
Lan Na	1564	12,000	One of four armies that marched to Chiang Mai from Ayutthaya. From Chiang Mai, marched to Chiang Saen and secured allegiance there.
Lan Xang	1564–65	24,000	Commander-in-chief of the campaign. Took Vientiane in January 1565. Installed a vassal ruler. Spent the next seven months fruitlessly searching for King Setthathirath's troops in the Lan Xang countryside. Returned to Pegu in August 1565.
Siam	1568–69	11,000	Led one of the five armies that invaded Siam.
Lan Xang	1569–70	11 regiments	Led one of five armies that invaded Lan Xang in October 1569. His army invaded northern Lan Xang via Lamphun. Burmese armies spent months in the countryside searching for elusive bands of guerrilla forces but returned in March 1570, having lost many men from starvation and disease. Very few men of the original army survived to reach their own country.
Mohnyin and Mogaung	1571–72	12,000	Led one of two 12,000-strong armies dispatched to northern Kachin hills to put down a rebellion. Thado Dhamma Yaza II commanded the other. Reconquered Mohnyin and Mogaung without a fight. Chased rebel chiefs to the jungle but could not find them.
Lan Xang	1574	11,000	Led one of three vanguard armies that invaded Lan Xang. Saw no action. Took Vientiane without a fight.
Mohnyin and Mogaung	1575	7,000	Led one of five armies that put down another rebellion in northern Kachin hills. His army and Thado Minsaw's army chased the rebels to the northern hills. One of the battalions from Thado Minsaw's army found the rebel chiefs and killed one of them.
Lan Xang	1579–80	22,000	Led a force to restore law and order after instabilities rose in Lan Xang. Spent months in the Lan Xang countryside but saw no resistance. Arrived back at Pegu on 20 March 1580. (Note: Chronicles (Maha Yazawin Vol. 3 2006: 68–69) say he arrived back on Sunday, 8th waxing of 942 ME but 8th waxing is a typographical error. 8th waxing of 942 ME translates to Wednesday, 23 March 1580. It was probably 5th waxing of Tagu 942 ME, which translates to Sunday, 20 March 1580. The Burmese numerals 5 (၅) and 8 (၈) written in longhand can easily be mixed up.)

=== Administration ===
Nanda was an active member of the Pegu court dominated by ethnic Mon ministers. His father listened to Nanda's input even if he did not always heed his son's suggestions. He took on an increasingly greater role in the last two years of his father's reign when the king's health deteriorated. (Note: As seen in (Hmannan Vol. 3 2003: 49, 53), Bayinnaung began to back away as early as 1579, and gave Nanda a greater role. In his appointment of Nawrahta Minsaw as ruler of Lan Na, the king acknowledged his failing health, and asked Nawrahta Minsaw to obey Nanda as the health of the kingdom depends on their unity. Later that year, Bayinnaung asked Nanda to go to Lan Xang to restore order there.)

== Early reign ==
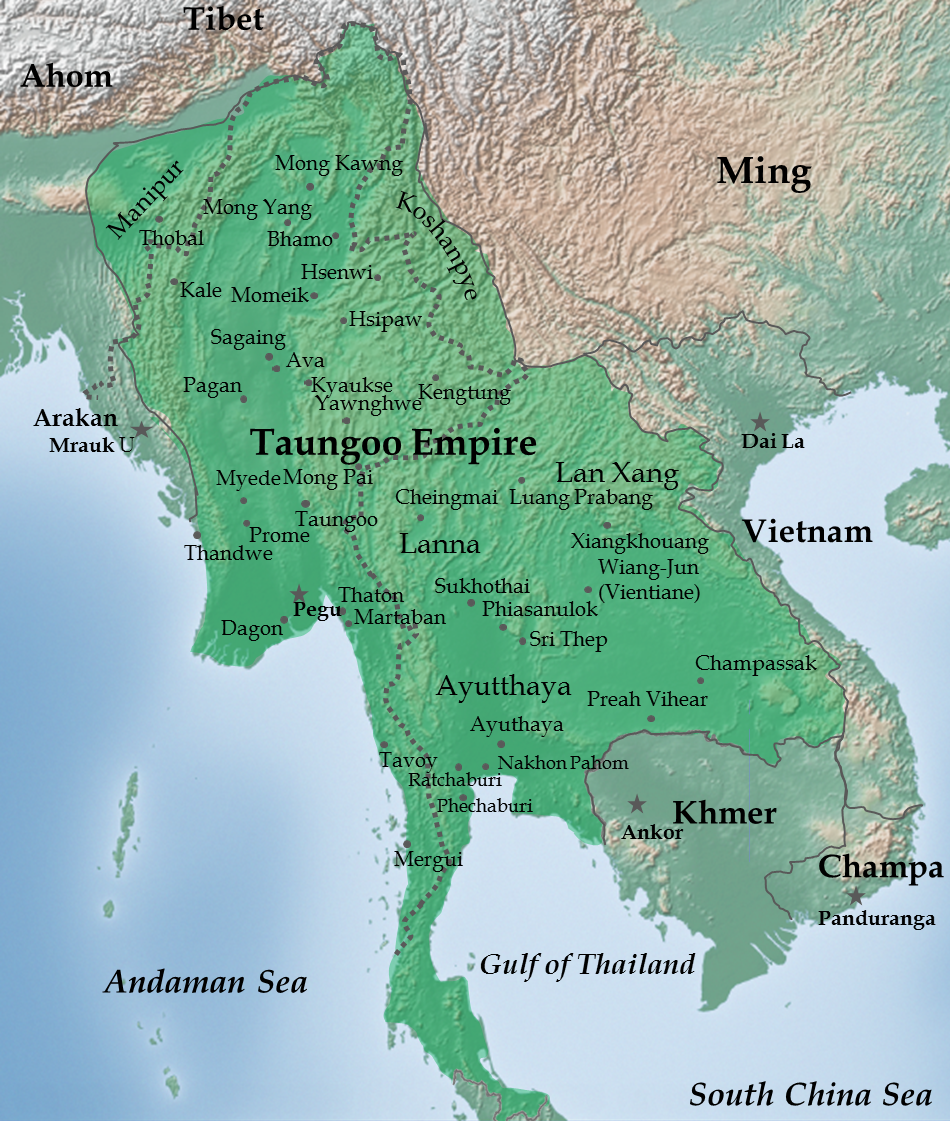
Toungoo Empire in 1580. "States as far east as Annam and Cambodia probably paid propitiatory homage to Bayinnaung." Chronicles also claim Cachar and much deeper parts of Yunnan, and treat the Ceylonese Kingdom of Kotte as a protectorate.

=== Accession ===
Bayinnaung died on 10 October 1581 after a long illness, and Nanda succeeded without incident. He cremated his father's body in the Buddhist tradition of Cakkavatti (universal ruler) in front of the Kanbawzathadi Palace. Nanda was crowned king on 15 October 1581. (Note: Both standard chronicles Maha Yazawin and Hmannan Yazawin state that Nanda's coronation ceremony was held on the Sunday following the king's death. But they each give a different date. Maha Yazawin (Maha Yazawin Vol. 3 206: 77) gives Sunday, 4th waning of Tazaungmon 943 ME, which translates to Saturday, 14 October 1581, whereas Hmannan Yazawin (Hmannan Vol. 3 2003: 73) gives Sunday, 5th waning of Tazaungmon 943 ME, or Sunday, 15 October 1581.) He appointed his eldest son Mingyi Swa his heir-apparent.

=== State of the empire ===
Nanda had inherited what was "probably the largest empire in the history of Southeast Asia" and what the Portuguese regarded as "the most powerful monarchy in Asia except that of China". Yet, it was an "absurdly overextended" empire, largely held together by Bayinnaung's personal relationships with his vassal rulers, who were loyal to Bayinnaung and not the kingdom of Toungoo. To administer the kingdom, Bayinnaung largely followed then prevailing Southeast Asian administrative model of solar polities in which the high king ruled the core while semi-independent tributaries, autonomous viceroys, and governors actually controlled day-to-day administration and manpower. In the tradition of the system, every new high king had to establish his authority with the vassals all over again. This was already very difficult when vassals were situated in the same geographic region but nearly impossible with faraway lands, given inherent difficulties in bringing serious warfare to those lands.

The historian G.E. Harvey noted that Nanda was "saddled with an impossible legacy" of the holding the empire together, and his "one hope of keeping the country together was to evacuate Siam and retrench in every direction." Without the benefit of hindsight, Nanda would try to hold on to the "impossible legacy". He spent the first months of his reign reaffirming the loyalty of the vassal rulers to him. For their part, the vassal rulers, who governed what used to be sovereign states as recently as only a few decades ago, would break away at any first hint of weakness. But no one was yet ready to make the first move against Nanda, an experienced military commander in his own right, and adopted a "wait-and-see attitude". By May 1582, all the key vassal rulers, including the ruler of Siam, the most powerful vassal state, had sent tribute. Even King Min Phalaung of Arakan, half of whose kingdom was under Toungoo occupation in 1580–81, sent an embassy in early 1583 to Pegu to offer a truce between the two kingdoms, to which Nanda agreed.

== Futile wars ==
Within the year of his accession, Nanda had to deal with a seemingly small rebellion in northernmost Shan states in present-day Yunnan. The rebellion was put down but it led to rebellions by Ava and Siam in 1584. The rebellion in Ava was put down but that in Siam could not be. Between 1584 and 1593, Nanda manically launched five invasions of Siam, all of which failed. The king never had the full support of his other vassals, and could never field more than a third of the number his father led. By the end of the invasions, his core base of Lower Burma was severely depopulated, and would be unable to stop further breakaways.

=== Initial rebellions ===
==== Chinese Shan states (1582–83) ====
The first rebellion started in the Chinese Shan states of Sanda and Thaungthut (present-day Dehong and Baoshan prefectures in Yunnan, China), which never sent tribute to the new king. In September/October 1582, Nanda sent two armies (16,000 men, 1,400 horses, 100 elephants) led by Thado Dhamma Yaza II of Prome and Nawrahta Minsaw of Lan Na for a punitive expedition. The armies spent five months at Sanda before finally taking the town, and arrived back at Pegu on 9 April 1583 .

==== Ava (1584) ====
But all was not well. Although the two armies had been drawn mainly from Upper Burma and Shan states, Nanda did not ask Thado Minsaw, the viceroy of Ava, to join the campaign, much less lead it. Thado Minsaw was a half-uncle of Nanda, and was married to Nanda's only full sister. Despite the deep familial ties, the slight did not go unnoticed in Ava. In June/July 1583, Thado Minsaw sent secret embassies to Prome, Toungoo and Chiang Mai to raise simultaneous rebellions. His intention was not to seek Nanda's imperial throne but to rule Upper Burma independently. The three viceroys sided with Nanda and secretly forwarded the news to Nanda.

At Pegu, Nanda was particularly concerned that Ava had the support of the Shan states. To counter the manpower of Upper Burma, Nanda secretly ordered troops from Prome, Toungoo, Lan Na, Lan Xang and Siam during the dry season of 1583–84. To be sure, he did not trust his remaining vassals either, especially Minkhaung II of Toungoo, his other half uncle who once revolted against none other than Bayinnaung. As a result, Nanda built a series of canals between Toungoo and Pegu. In March 1584, armies from Prome, Toungoo, Lan Na, Lan Xang and Siam marched to Ava. Mingyi Swa was left with a sizable force to guard Pegu.

At Ava, Thado Minsaw asked his loyalists from the Shan states to send help while his army tried to hold off the invading armies. On 24 April 1584, the two armies met t the outskirts of Ava—between Tada-U and Pinya. Faced with an overwhelming force, Thado Minsaw issued a challenge of single combat on war elephants to his nephew, who accepted. The nephew prevailed after a long drawn out battle, driving off his uncle off the field. Thado Minsaw with 2,000 of his men fled to northern hills but died en route.

==== Siam (1584) ====
The Ava rebellion turned out to be just the opening Siam was looking for. The "proud kingdom" had been preparing its defenses for the eventual showdown with Pegu. Its ruler Maha Thammarachathirat sent a 6,000-man army led by his son Naresuan ostensibly for Nanda's Ava campaign. But the Siamese army did not march to Ava as ordered but hovered around Pegu. After Ava fell quickly, the Siamese army withdrew to Martaban (Mottama), and declared independence on 3 May 1584 . Nanda in anger dispatched an expedition force (4,000 men, 400 horses, 40 elephants) to chase the Siamese troops to their country. When he got back to Pegu, he led another army (7,000 men, 500 horses, 50 elephants), and followed up. His son Mingyi Swa was his deputy. Unlike his father's meticulously planned Siamese campaigns, the expedition was hastily planned. An 11,000-man invasion force could have never conquered Siam, let alone in the rainy season. Indeed, the troops were caught unprepared by the flooded countryside by the Chao Phraya, and were nearly wiped out by Siamese on their war canoes.

=== Interlude I (1584–86) ===
Nanda was in a bind. His ministers warned that a failure to recapture Siam would trigger domino-like rebellions elsewhere in the empire. The problem was that he still did not have complete control over his vassals to raise a large enough force that had a reasonable shot at reconquering Siam. He tried to replace the vassals with his loyalists at every opportunity. In May 1584, he appointed Min Letya, son of King Tabinshwehti, as governor of Ava in place of Thado Minsaw. The office was strictly a non-hereditary governorship, not the viceroyship Thado Minsaw enjoyed. But Nanda could not replace hereditary rulers without cause. When Viceroy Minkhaung II of Toungoo died in June/July 1584, he had to accept the late viceroy's eldest son Minye Thihathu II as the rightful successor. Minye Thihathu II for his part pledged loyalty to his cousin.

Nanda spent the next year and a half consolidating his rule over the remaining empire. On 3 March 1585, he donated five Buddha statues, for which he would be remembered as "Nga-zu Dayaka Min" (ငါးဆူဒါယကာမင်း, "Donor King of Five Buddha Statues"). But the court reported that not taking action in Siam was being interpreted as weakness in Lan Na, Lan Xang and Shan states, and urged that the king deal with Siam. History shows that it was a bad recommendation by the court. The vassals' tepid support meant that the king could not have raised enough manpower to capture Siam. If Nanda's best hope of keeping the core country intact was to retrench from the empire's overextended positions, the king and his court could not see it.

=== Resumption of Siamese war (1586–87) ===
In 1586, the king embarked on what turned out to be suicidal invasions of Siam with whatever he had. He chose to pick off northern Siam first. In March 1586, an army (12,000 troops, 1,200 horses, 100 elephants) led by Mingyi Swa invaded northern Siam from Lan Na. But the army could not get past a heavily fortified Lampang led by Naresuan, and had to withdraw in June. Undeterred, Nanda launched a two-pronged invasion in the following dry season on 19 October 1586 with (25,000 troops, 1,200 horses, 220 elephants). His largest invasion force nonetheless remained vastly inadequate to conquer a major power like Siam, and indeed was only about a third of Bayinnaung's 1568 invasion.

The invasion fared well initially. Both armies overcame Siamese defenses and arrived before Ayutthaya by December. But the armies were not ready for a long-term siege of the heavily fortified capital. Because of poor planning, the troops began dying in thousands "from want and exposure" by February 1587. By March, the siege began to falter, and supplies streamed into Ayutthaya through gaps in the Burmese lines. The Burmese forces began their painful withdrawal on 20 April 1587, being chased throughout by the enemy. Only a small portion of the original army made it back across the border.

=== Interlude II (1587–90) ===
The failed invasion forced him to regroup for the next three years. The restless vassals, even the smaller ones, were beginning to test. In November 1587, he had to send an army of 4,000 to put down a rebellion in a small Shan state of Inya. It took the army seven months to bring the state back into the fold. Whenever leadership positions became vacant in key vassal states, he appointed his loyalists: his middle son Minye Kyawswa II as Viceroy of Ava on 7 February 1587; Sen Soulintha as King of Lan Xang in December 1588; another son Thado Dhamma Yaza III as Viceroy of Prome on 28 February 1589.

=== Final campaigns ===
==== Siam and Mogaung (1590–92) ====
With his sons at Ava and Prome in charge of the entire Irrawaddy valley, Nanda planned to resume the war against Siam. He had raised the largest force yet, 30,000 men. But the powerful Shan state of Mogaung had revolted, refusing to contribute its quota. Instead of focusing on Mogaung, the king decided to wage war on two fronts. He scaled back his invasion to northern Siam. He sent a 10,000-man army led by Thado Dhamma Yaza III and Natshinnaung to Mogaung on 2 November 1590, and a 20,000-man army led by Mingyi Swa to Siam on 24 November 1590 .

The northern army took Mogaung by March 1591, and brought back the rebellious saopha to Pegu. But after the army left, the rebel chief's son, who was hiding outside the city, seized the city in November 1591. An 8,000-strong army led by Minye Kyawswa II had to return and put down the rebellion by mid-1592.

The southern army had no such success. Like in 1586, Mingyi Swa invaded northern Siam from Lan Na, and could not again get past the Lampang fort led by Naresuan. But unlike in 1586, it was no mere retreat. The army was thoroughly defeated outside Lampang in March 1591. The remaining army arrived back in such disarray that Nanda verbally disparaged Mingyi Swa and executed some of the top generals.

==== Final invasion of Siam (1592–93) ====
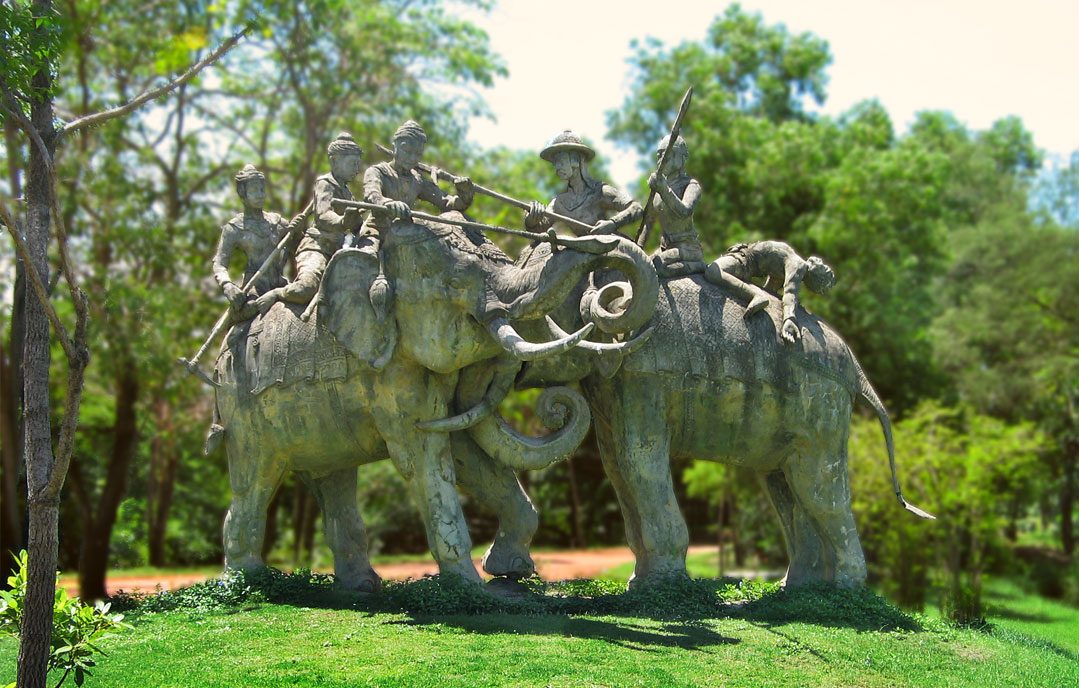
Thai commemoration of single combat between Naresuan and Mingyi Swa at Nong Sarai

Fresh off the success, Naresuan switched to offense in the following dry season of 1591–92 by raiding upper Tenasserim coast with a 5,000-strong army. Though army units from Martaban (Mottama) drove back Naresuan's army, the raid was a clear sign that the balance of power was shifting in favor of the former vassal state. Nanda and his court deliberated at length about their response, fully considering the military setbacks and their inability to raise men. In the end, the court suggested and the king agreed to yet another invasion of Siam.

On 4 November 1592, (Note: (Maha Yazawin Vol. 3 2006: 93) gives Wednesday, 12th waxing of Nadaw 954 ME which translates to Sunday, 14 November 1592 . But (Hmannan Vol. 3 2003: 93) corrects it as Wednesday 2nd waning of Nadaw, which translates to Wednesday, 4 November 1592, NS.) an invasion army of 24,000 tried again. After seven weeks, the army fought its way to Suphanburi, a town just to the west of Ayutthaya. Here Burmese chronicle and Siamese chronicle narratives give different accounts. Burmese chronicles say that a battle took place on 8 January 1593, in which Mingyi Swa and Naresuan fought on their war elephants. In the battle, Mingyi Swa was felled by a gunshot, after which the Burmese army retreated. According to Siamese chronicles, the battle took place on 18 January 1593. (Note: (Damrong 2001: 128): Monday, 2nd waning of the second Siamese month of 954 CS (18 January 1593 NS).) Like in the Burmese chronicles, the battle started out between the two forces but the Siamese chronicles say that midway through the battle, the two sides agreed to decide the outcome by having a duel between Mingyi Swa and Naresuan on their elephants, and that Mingyi Swa was cut down by Naresuan.

At any rate, the Burmese forces retreated, suffering heavy casualties along the way by incessant Siamese attacks. It was the last of Pegu's campaigns. Siam's independence was now secured. For the next dozen years, it was Burma that would be on the defensive, "the tables of war turning for the first time in 30 years."

== Fall of Toungoo Empire ==
The latest defeat in Siam was significant. The remaining vassals clearly saw that Pegu could no longer launch a credible offensive war. Nanda belatedly tried to retrench from his ambitions but it was too late. All of the vassals would have revolted by 1597, and by 1598, his core country Pegu would be under siege.

=== Instabilities in the core country (1593–94) ===
By 1593, Nanda was having trouble even in his home base of Lower Burma, which had borne the brunt of his conscription drives year after year. Many people of Lower Burma, many whom were ethnic Mons, fled military service to become monks, debt-slaves, private retainers, or refugees in nearby kingdoms. Chronicles speak of a December 1593 unrest in Hmawbi, a small town to the west of Pegu. While the unrest was easily put down, its proximity to the capital was a telltale sign that the people were desperate. To help him administer the core country, Nanda brought back Minye Kyawswa II from Ava, making his middle son by the chief queen his heir-apparent on 29 December [O.S. 19 December] 1593. (Note: (Maha Yazawin Vol. 3: 95): Wednesday, 8th waxing of Pyatho 955 ME = 29 December 1593.)

The king did not appoint a replacement viceroy or even a governor at Ava to administer the upcountry. With that decision, he had effectively retreated from Upper Burma and Shan states. It shows that he was more concerned about having a strong potential rival in the upcountry than about dealing with myriad competing minor vassal rulers from afar. The decision was not cost free. Without closer control of a viceroy, Nanda would not be able to enlist any men from the remaining vassals in Upper Burma and Shan states in the following years.

At any rate, the new heir-apparent turned out to be a tyrant. He immediately set out to tighten his grip on Lower Burma, branding men to facilitate identification, executing deserters, and forcing monks into the army. Thado Dhamma Yaza III, viceroy of Prome, openly disagreed with his brother's policies, and the two brothers got into a quarrel. Nanda was forced to intervene, officially releasing the conscripted men and seized property. But the damage was already done. Coercion proved self-defeating. With cultivators disappearing, rice prices in Lower Burma reached unheard of levels. In October 1594, (Note: (Maha Yazawin Vol. 3 2006: 95): Tazaungmon 956 ME = 13 October to 11 November 1594 NS) the ruler of Moulmein (Mawlamyine) revolted with Siamese support.

=== First Siamese invasion (1594–95) ===
Nanda responded to the revolt by sending an 8,000-strong army led by Minye Thihathu II and Thiri Dhammathawka. Unbeknownst to the Burmese command, the city had been reinforced by Siamese troops led by none other than Naresuan. The army was driven back. In December, (Note: Chronicles (Maha Yazawin Vol. 3 2006: 95–96) say the Siamese army retreated on 6 April 1595 after a four-month siege of Pegu. Thus, the Siamese army must have laid siege to Pegu in December.) the Siamese forces (12,000 troops, 600 horses, 60 elephants) marched to Pegu. Nanda was caught totally flatfooted; he had not expected an invasion by Siam. The Siamese army now laid siege to Pegu.

The tables were now completely turned. The king in desperation asked his vassals Prome, Toungoo and Lan Na for help. Aid was slow in coming. Minye Thihathu II of Toungoo, who had just lost many of his men at Moulmein, had to raise more men. Nawrahta Minsaw of Lan Na was facing a threat of attack from the king of Lan Xang, who officially was still a vassal of Pegu. Finally, Thado Dhamma Yaza III of Prome had already decided to revolt against his father. It was only in early April that combined forces of Toungoo and Lan Na came to relieve the city, forcing Naresuan to withdraw on 6 April [O.S. 27 March] 1595. But Siam had gained the upper Tenasserim coast.

=== Disintegration (1595–97) ===
By then, Prome had revolted. Prome's forces, hoping to consolidate central Burma, attacked Toungoo whose main forces were at the Pegu front. But they could not break through Toungoo's fortified defenses led by Natshinnaung, and had to retreat after two weeks. But Prome had taken over western central Burma up to Pakhan in the north, close to Ava.

Successful rebellions begot more rebellions. Lan Xang's ruler Nokeo Koumane (Noh Meuang) also revolted c. November 1595. (Note: (Simms & Simms 2001: 89–90) says Nokeo Koumane revolted in 1593 but (Fernquest 2005: 47) says the earliest evidence of a Lan Xang revolt against Nanda in the Lan Xang, Chiang Mai, Ayutthaya and Burmese chronicles is 957 ME (11 April 1595 to 9 April 1596). He had already revolted by November 1595. According to the Nan Chronicle (Ratchasomphan 1994: 67), Lan Xang and Nan forces fought a battle with Lan Na forces on 25 November 1595 NS.) The Lan Xang rebellion was overdue. Nanda had held onto Lan Xang thus far only because his vassals were themselves weak. Neither Maha Ouparat (r. 1574–88) nor Sen Soulintha (r. 1588–91) appeared to have ruled beyond Vientiane. Anarchy reigned in the countryside. (Note: Laotian history per (Simms & Simms 2001: 86–89) holds that Maha Ouparat died in 1579 and was followed by Soulintha who ruled between 1580–82, and that there were no rulers between 1583 and 1591 in Lan Xang. However, both standard Burmese chronicles (Maha Yazawin Vol. 3 2006: 89) and (Hmannan Vol. 3 2003: 88) say Maha Ouparat died in Thadingyut 950 ME (19 September to 17 October 1588 NS). However, Laotian history's eight years of anarchy is still probable since Maha Ouparat, not deemed an effective ruler even in the Burmese chronicles, probably did not have much control beyond the capital.) In 1591, Nanda placed a 20-year-old Nokeo Koumane, a son of King Setthathirath who grew up in Pegu, on the throne, hoping for a pliant ruler. The young ruler consolidated his hold over his realm by defeating Luang Praban, and finally declared independence in 1595. Nokeo Koumane now proceeded to attack Lan Na, briefly taking over Nan. Nawrahta Minsaw drove back the invaders, without receiving any help from his overlord Nanda. But Nanda caught a break. Nokeo Koumane died shortly after in 1596. His anointed 12-year-old successor Vorawongsa, and his father Vorapita traveled to Pegu to gain permission to rule. Nanda agreed to the request but asked Vorapita to be the regent. By the time, they arrived back to Vientiane, Lan Xang's historical rival Lan Na had revolted. Lan Xang declared war on Lan Na, not at the behest of Pegu but for itself. Although Lan Xang would not officially renounce all tributary ties to Burma until 1603, the mountainous kingdom for all intents and purposes was independent by 1597.

Closer to home, Toungoo also revolted in late 1596/early 1597, around the same time as Lan Na. In Upper Burma, the prince of Nyaungyan had emerged as the main power. In May 1596, he had driven out Prome's forces from Pakhan, ostensibly on behalf of Nanda. But he was quietly consolidating territory for himself. After Lan Na's and Toungoo's declarations of independence, he too announced plans to take over Ava on 19 April [O.S. 9 April] 1597—without Nanda's permission. He brazenly moved into the newly built palace on 29 August [O.S. 19 August] 1597. Nyaungyan never formally revolted but offered no support to the high king either.

Nanda's once mighty empire had been reduced to a strip of coastal Lower Burma (Pegu and the Irrawaddy delta). The former vassal rulers now effectively ignored the high king as inconsequential, instead now saw each other as rivals. It was a natural return to multilateral relations among the smaller states that had existed before the rise of the Toungoo Empire. Concerned by Nyaungyan's takeover of Upper Burma, Thado Dhamma Yaza III of Prome decided to invade the upcountry. But he was assassinated on 15 September [O.S. 5 September] 1597 by one of his advisers. Toungoo tried to pick off Prome but the new ruler of Prome, Yan Naing, fended off Toungoo's attacks. In the middle Tai country too, chaos reigned. Lan Na and Lan Xang were locked in conflict. Lan Na's own vassals (Nan, Chiang Saen, Chiang Rai) were in revolt. Siam began to intervene the upcountry affairs in 1598, gaining Lan Na c. 1601/02 but chaos continued on the Lan Na countryside.

=== Fall from power ===
Having failed at Prome, Toungoo looked south to Pegu. In late 1597, Toungoo and Arakan agreed to a joint attack on Pegu. Toungoo forces moved the forward base to Kawliya, a town northeast of Pegu in March 1598. In the following dry season, Arakanese and Toungoo forces invaded Lower Burma. The Arakanese navy, consisted Portuguese mercenaries, overran the key port of Syriam (Thanlyin) in March 1599. Both Toungoo and Arakanese laid siege to Pegu in April. Eight months into the siege, Nanda's heir-apparent, Minye Kyawswa II, defected to the besiegers, after being promised good treatment. However, it was an empty promise. The prince was executed at Toungoo by Natshinnaung. After the defection, the king himself gave up, and surrendered on 19 December [O.S. 9 December] 1599. The fallen king was sent to Toungoo.

The victors divided the enormous wealth of Pegu, accumulated over the past 60 years as the capital of the Toungoo Empire. The gold, silver and precious stones were equally divided. The Arakanese share also included several brazen cannon, 30 Khmer bronze statues, and a white elephant. Toungoo forces returned home with their share of the loot on 14 February [O.S. 4 February] 1600, leaving the Arakanese in charge of the city. A month later, the Arakanese forces burned down the entire city, including the Grand Palace of King Bayinnaung.

== Exile and death ==
Nanda along with his chief queen Hanthawaddy Mibaya returned to his birth city of Toungoo. They treated well there. But Nanda's presence at the palace was not welcomed by Natshinnaung, the heir-apparent of Toungoo. Natshinnaung intensely disliked Nanda because the fallen king had once denied Natshinnaung's request for a marriage to the love of his life, Yaza Datu Kalaya, the widow of Mingyi Swa. When the Siamese forces came to lay siege to Toungoo in April 1600, demanding Minye Thihathu to give up the fallen king, the 21-year-old Natshinnaung urged his father to give Nanda up. But the father refused, knowing that agreeing to Naresuan's symbolic demand would be seen as a sign of submission to the Siamese king.

Even after the Siamese retreated, Natshinnaung continued to look for an opportunity to remove Nanda. On the night of 30 November [O.S. 20 November] 1600, the prince assassinated the fallen king. Minye Thihathu was extremely displeased with his son's action, and ordered a respectful cremation ceremony for his cousin. He also kept the dowager queen with her attendants at the palace.

== Legacy ==
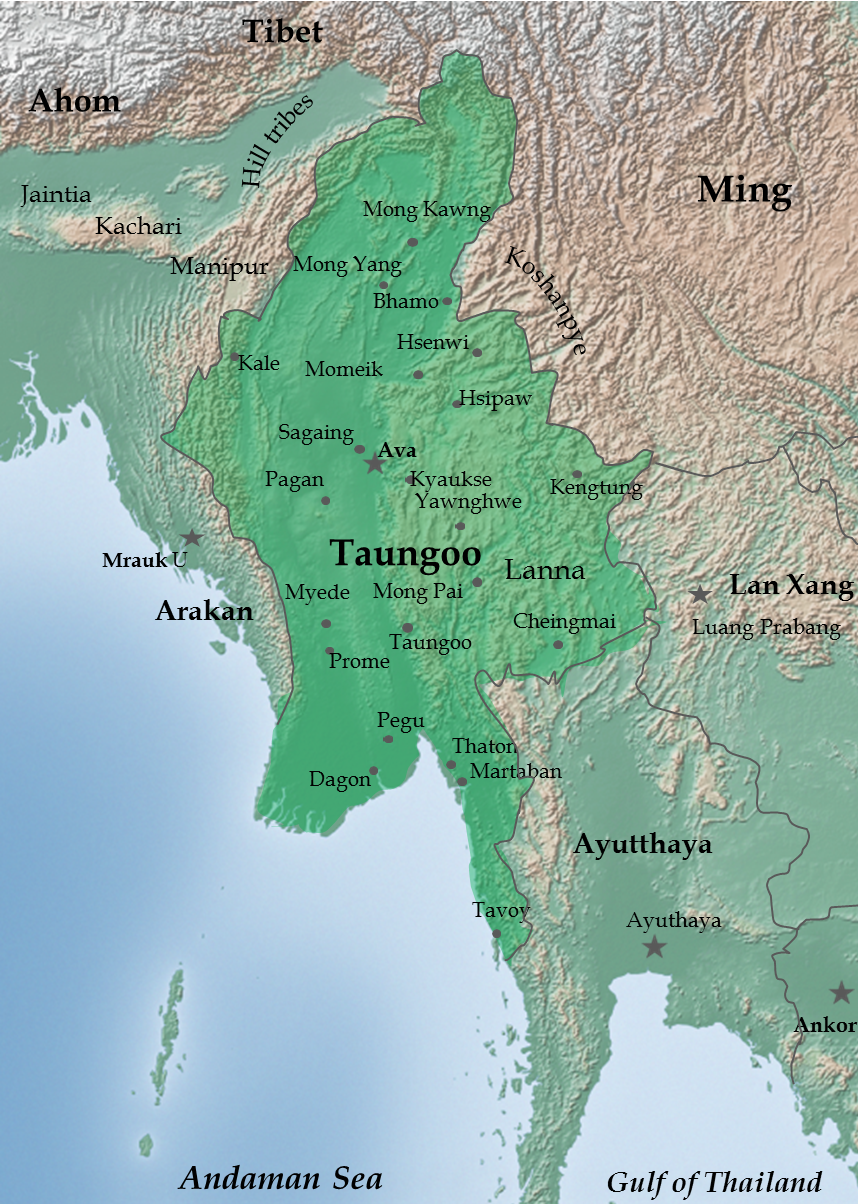
Restored Toungoo Empire c. 1650, a "realistic and organic unit" that "walked on two legs".

Nanda by all accounts was an energetic monarch, who from his youth upward, had served in the armed forces and still led them in person. There is no reason to suppose that he was not "above the average of Burmese kings." But unlike no other Burmese kings, he inherited the largest empire in the history of the region, which historians call an "impossible legacy," "improbable domain," "absurdly overextended" empire. His mistake was to hold on to this empire without an administrative system, and without the support of the vassal rulers.

Nanda's failures showed several following generations of Burmese monarchs about the perils of over-extension, and the need to establish a more centralized administration in place of hereditary chieftainships. The 17th century Toungoo kings rebuilt the fallen empire by the mid-1620s but they deliberately refrained from invading Siam and Lan Xang. The restored empire was a "realistic and organic unit,... which did not extend in any direction to a point where Burma's supply lines were more extended than those of her nearest lowland rival." The Restored Toungoo kings also instituted an administrative system that replaced hereditary chieftainships with appointed governorships in the entire Irrawaddy valley, and greatly reduced the hereditary rights of Shan chiefs.

== Family ==
Nanda had five principal queens (two of whom give birth children), all of whom were his first cousins. His chief queen was Hanthawaddy Mibaya, daughter of King Tabinshwehti. He had seven children (three sons and four daughters) by the chief queen and one daughter by one principal queen .

Queen	Rank	Issue
Hanthawaddy Mibaya	Chief Queen (Mibaya Khaunggyi)	1. Min A-Gyi or Yadana Kanda (daughter) married to Minye Kyawhtin of Kawliya, the son of Minkhaung II of Toungoo; 2. Min Htwe or Kyan Suchar (daughter); 3. Mingyi Swa, Crown Prince (r. 1581–93); 4. Khin Ma Hnaung or Thein Daw Hnaung, Queen of Arakan (r. 1600–12); 5. Khin Min Pu (daughter) died at age 19 years old 6. Minye Kyawswa II aka Minye Kyawswa Sunt, Crown Prince (r. 1593–99); 7. Thado Dhamma Yaza III, Viceroy of Prome (r. 1589–97)
Thiri Yaza Dewi	Queen of the Northern Palace	1. Min Shwe-Tung aka Khin Ma Shwe-Tone (daughter) married to Minye Kyawhtin II of Kawliya son of Minye Thihathu II of Toungoo

Nanda had eleven children from concubines.

Name	Mother	Brief
1. Minye Yan Hnaung	Khin Gyi Sit aka Pak Lee La the daughter of Inwa Sithu Kyawhtin (Hso Kyaw Hpa)	Son Gov.of Tada-U married to Thiri Eka daughter of Nyaungyan Min
2. Mintha Hting Thikyawsan	Yadana Yawt Kaew aka Bua Phan Dheen Loum Hpa the daughter of Sao Kyettaboutphromminh the Gov.of Nan	Son Gov. of Myinsaing married to Khin Myat Theik daughter of Natshinnaung
3. Shin Sithu aka Sithu Kyawhtin	Nang Giao Hkam the daughter of Sao Kaew Bounnam, the Saopha of Chiang Tung	Son, received the rank Minye Thinkhaya Gov.of Toungoo in reign Hanthawaddy Mahadhammaraja and later received the title Thiri Dhamma Thawka, married to Khin Min Pu daughter of King Nyaungyan Min and married to Htwe Nat Hla Phanuwaddy the daughter of Filipe de Brito e Nicote the King of Syrium
4. Minye Aung Naing	Kyampee Raekyaem the daughter of Dao Hké Hpa the Saopha of Mong Ti	Son Gov.of Paunlin in King Anaukpetlun's reign later married to Khin Min Hla daughter of King Nyaungyan Min
5. Minye Hla Kyaw	Min Sanda ( né Hka Naun Sai Oung) the royal princess the daughter of Hso Go Hpa the Saopha of Sanda	Son Gov.of Myitkyina
6. Loutsathouttha	Tawan Luen Khoy the royal princess the daughter of Phra Ramesuan the Maha Uparaja of Yodaya	Daughter
7. Minye Thiha	Sao Nang Jig Hkam the daughter of Hkam Gaw Hpa the saopha of Mobye	Son Gov.of Pyay in reign Maharajamanisula Dayakadaw and married with Min Khin Hla the daughter of King Nyaungyan Min
8. Ne Myo Dathta	Taen Hkam Lao the younger sister of King Setthathirath from Lan-Xang	Son Gov.of Hinthada in reign Maharajamanisula Dayakadaw
9. Mintha Ekathu	Khin Ma Htwe Da the daughter of Smim Htaw	Son, Gov.of Kyaikkhami in King Anaukpetlun
10. Wara Myat Baw aka Yadana Nyunt Paung Hpone Nyat	His half-sister Yadana Nyunt Thit daughter of King Bayinnaung	Daughter married to the ex Gov.of Tawng Kyé
11. Khin Shwe Nan	Zinme Minthami, Khin Mye (maybe mean Hkuen Mueng in Tai accent) other name's Nang Päen Hkam the daughter of Mekuti	Daughter married to Hkam Hkine Noi the Saopha of Hsenwi

Among his principal queens the outstanding queens who had no issue were Min Phyu and Min Htwe (Both were daughters of King Minkhaung II of Toungoo) and Min Taya Medaw, the daughter of Thado Dhamma Yaza II

In all he had 19 children 11 sons and 8 daughters (Not included Maung Saw Phyu)

3 sons and 5 daughters by principal queens, and 8 sons and 3 daughters by junior queens. 2 of the notable children by junior queens were: Thiri Dhamma Thawka (Gov. of Toungoo) and Minye Thiha (Gov. of Pyay) in the reign of King Anaukpetlun and King Maharajamanisula Dayakadaw. and each one appear in Arakanese chronicle Maung Saw Phyu, The Rakhine King Min Khamaung his brother-in-law appointed him as the governor of Chittagong in 1614

== Bibliography ==
- Aung-Thwin, Michael A. (November 1996). "The Myth of the "Three Shan Brothers" and the Ava Period in Burmese History". The Journal of Asian Studies. 55 (4): 881–901. doi:10.2307/2646527. JSTOR 2646527.
- Aung-Thwin, Michael A.; Maitrii Aung-Thwin (2012). A History of Myanmar Since Ancient Times (illustrated ed.). Honolulu: University of Hawai'i Press. ISBN 978-1-86189-901-9.
- Fernquest, Jon (Spring 2005). "The Flight of Lao War Captives from Burma back to Laos in 1596: A Comparison of Historical Sources" (PDF). SOAS Bulletin of Burma Research. 3 (1). ISSN 1479-8484. Archived from the original (PDF) on 2022-01-18.
- Harvey, G. E. (1925). History of Burma: From the Earliest Times to 10 March 1824. London: Frank Cass & Co. Ltd.
- Htin Aung, Maung (1967). A History of Burma. New York and London: Cambridge University Press.
- Kala, U (2006) [1724]. Maha Yazawin (in Burmese). Vol. 1–3 (4th printing ed.). Yangon: Ya-Pyei Publishing.
- Lieberman, Victor B. (2003). Strange Parallels: Southeast Asia in Global Context, c. 800–1830, volume 1, Integration on the Mainland. Cambridge University Press. ISBN 978-0-521-80496-7.
- Maha Sithu (2012) [1798]. Kyaw Win; Thein Hlaing (eds.). Yazawin Thit (in Burmese). Vol. 1–3 (2nd ed.). Yangon: Ya-Pyei Publishing.
- Phayre, Lt. Gen. Sir Arthur P. (1967) [1883]. History of Burma. London: Susil Gupta.
- Ratchasomphan (Sænluang.) (1994). David K. Wyatt (ed.). The Nan Chronicle. SEAP Publications. ISBN 9780877277156.
- Royal Historical Commission of Burma (2003) [1832]. Hmannan Yazawin (in Burmese). Vol. 1–3. Yangon: Ministry of Information, Myanmar.
- Sandamala Linkara, Ashin (1997–1999) [1931]. Rakhine Razawin Thit (in Burmese). Vol. 1–2. Yangon: Tetlan Sarpay.
- Sein Lwin Lay, Kahtika U (2006) [1968]. Mintaya Shwe Hti and Bayinnaung: Ketumadi Taungoo Yazawin (in Burmese) (2nd printing ed.). Yangon: Yan Aung Sarpay.
- Simms, Peter; Sanda Simms (2001). The Kingdoms of Laos: Six Hundred Years of History (illustrated ed.). Psychology Press. ISBN 9780700715312.
- Stuart-Fox, Martin (2008). Historical Dictionary of Laos. Scarecrow Press. ISBN 9780810864115.
- Tarling, Nicholas (1999). The Cambridge History of Southeast Asia. Vol. 2 (illustrated ed.). Cambridge University Press. ISBN 9780521663700.
- Than Tun (1985). The Royal Orders of Burma, A.D. 1598–1885. Vol. 2. Kyoto University. hdl:2433/173789.
- Wyatt, David K. (2003). Thailand: A Short History (2 ed.). Yale University Press. ISBN 978-0-300-08475-7.

Nanda Bayin Toungoo dynasty Born: 9 November 1535 Died: 30 November 1600
Regnal titles
Preceded by Bayinnaung	King of Burma; 10 October 1581 – 19 December [O.S. 9 December] 1599	Succeeded by Nyaungyan
Royal titles
Preceded by Bayinnaung	Heir to the Burmese Throne; 11 January 1551 – 10 October 1581	Succeeded by Mingyi Swa
