= Taungoo Mingaung =

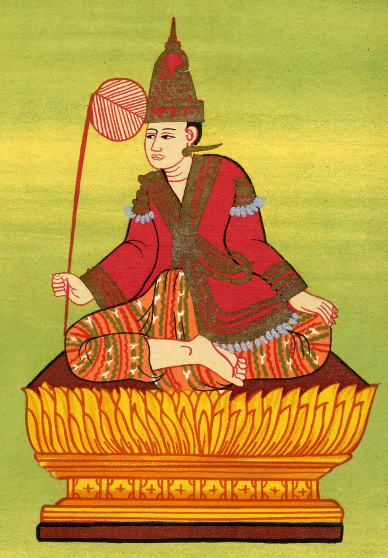
Taungoo Mingaung nat

Taungoo Mingaung (Burmese: တောင်ငူ မင်းခေါင် [tàʊɰ̃ŋù mɪ́ɰ̃ɡàʊɰ̃]) is one of the Thirty Seven nats in the official pantheon of Burmese nats. He is portrayed sitting crosslegged on a simple couch wearing royal garments, holding a fan in his right hand and resting his left hand on his knee.

According to the writer Hla Thamein and the colonial writer Sir Richard Carnac Temple, he is the nat representation of Minkhaung II, who was viceroy of Taungoo (r. 1549–1551, 1552–1584) and the third younger brother of King Bayinnaung of Taungoo dynasty. However, Minkhaung II died of natural causes whereas Viceroy Minkhaung I (r. 1446–1451) was brutally assassinated (repeatedly hacked to death by sword). Since death from violent murders is a leitmotif of the Thirty Seven nats, and one of the main criteria for being inducted into the pantheon, the nat may likely be based on Minkhaung I, not Minkhaung II.

== Bibliography ==
- Hla Thamein. "Thirty-Seven Nats". Yangonow. Archived from the original on 2006-06-24.
- Sein Lwin Lay, Kahtika U (2006) [1968]. Mintaya Shwe Hti and Bayinnaung: Ketumadi Taungoo Yazawin (in Burmese) (2nd printing ed.). Yangon: Yan Aung Sarpay.
