= Dhamma Dewi of Ava =

Dhamma Dewi ဓမ္မဒေဝီ

Queen of the Central Palace of Ava
- Tenure: March 1502 – 14 March 1527
- Predecessor: vacant
- Successor: vacant
- Born: c. 1480s Pakhan
- Died: Unknown; Ava (Inwa)
- Spouse: Narapati II
- Issue: Sanda Dewi
- Father: Thihapate II of Pakhan
- Religion: Theravada Buddhism

Dhamma Dewi of Pakhan (Burmese: ဓမ္မဒေဝီ, pronounced [dəma̰dèwì]; born Medaw Chit Pwa (မယ်တော် ချစ်ဘွား)) was a principal queen of King Narapati II of Ava. She married the king in March 1502. She was the great grandmother of King Natshinnaung of Toungoo (r. 1609–10).

== Bibliography ==
- Kala, U (1724). Maha Yazawin (in Burmese). Vol. 1–3 (2006, 4th printing ed.). Yangon: Ya-Pyei Publishing.

Dhamma Dewi of Ava Ava Kingdom
Royal titles
Preceded by	Queen of the Central Palace of Ava; 1502 – 1527	Vacant
