= Minkhaung I of Toungoo =

Minkhaung I of Toungoo တောင်ငူ မင်းခေါင်ငယ်
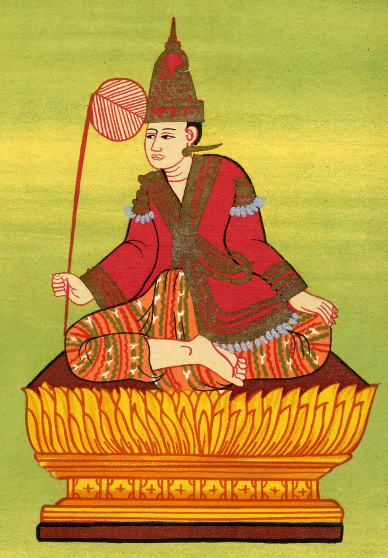

Viceroy of Toungoo
- Reign: 2 January 1446 – c. February 1452
- Predecessor: Tarabya of Toungoo
- Successor: Minye Kyawhtin of Toungoo
- Died: 1452; Toungoo (Taungoo)
- Father: Tarabya of Toungoo
- Religion: Theravada Buddhism

Minkhaung I of Toungoo (Burmese: တောင်ငူ မင်းခေါင်ငယ် pronounced [tàʊɴŋù mɪ́ɴɡàʊɴ ŋɛ̀]) was viceroy of Toungoo from 1446 to 1451. Having accidentally inherited the Toungoo throne after his father's sudden death, Minkhaung proved an ineffectual ruler of this perpetually unruly frontier vassal state of Ava Kingdom. He was assassinated in early 1452 by a servant of his cousin Minye Kyawhtin, who went on to seize Toungoo in his rebellion against King Narapati I of Ava. All royal chronicles starting with the Maha Yazawin chronicle, identify Minkhaung I of Toungoo as an ancestor (paternal great-great grandfather) of King Bayinnaung of Toungoo Dynasty.

He may also be the historical basis for the Taungoo Mingaung nat of the Thirty Seven Nats, the official pantheon of traditional Burmese spirits. Note that at least one writer, Hla Thamein, has identified Minkhaung II of Toungoo, a great-great grandson of Minkhaung I, as the basis for the spirit. However, unlike Minkhaung I who died from a violent murder—he was repeatedly hacked to death by sword—Minkhaung II died of natural causes. Since death from violent murders is a leitmotif of the Thirty Seven Nats, the spirit is likely based on Minkhaung I instead.

== Bibliography ==
- Hla Thamein. "Thirty-Seven Nats". Yangonow. Archived from the original on 2006-06-24.
- Sein Lwin Lay, Kahtika U (2006) [1968]. Mintaya Shwe Hti and Bayinnaung: Ketumadi Taungoo Yazawin (in Burmese) (2nd printing ed.). Yangon: Yan Aung Sarpay.
- Thaw Kaung, U (2010). Aspects of Myanmar History and Culture. Yangon: Gangaw Myaing.

Minkhaung I of Toungoo Toungoo Dynasty Died: c. February 1452
Royal titles
Preceded by Tarabya	Viceroy of Toungoo; 2 January 1446 – c. February 1452	Succeeded by Minye Kyawhtin
