= Hanthawaddy Mibaya =

Hanthawaddy Mibaya ဟံသာဝတီ မိဖုရား

Chief queen consort of Burma
- Tenure: 10 November 1581 – 19 December [O.S. 9 December] 1599
- Predecessor: Sanda Dewi
- Successor: Thiri Maha Dhamma Yaza Dipadi Dewi
- Born: c. 1536 c. 898 ME; Toungoo (Taungoo)
- Died: June 1606; 1st Waso 968 ME; Toungoo
- Spouse: Nanda Bayin
- Issue: 1. Thakin Gyi; 2. Min Htwe (daughter); 3. Mingyi Swa; 4. Khin Ma Hnaung (daughter); 5. Khin Pu (daughter); 6. Minye Kyawswa II; 7. Thado Dhamma Yaza III
- House: Toungoo
- Father: Tabinshwehti
- Mother: Dhamma Dewi?
- Religion: Theravada Buddhism

Hanthawaddy Mibaya (Note: Hanthawaddy Mibaya means Queen of Hanthawaddy (Pegu/Bago). Her birth name is not mentioned in the chronicles.) (Burmese: ဟံသာဝတီ မိဖုရား, pronounced [hàɴθàwədì mḭbəjá]; c. 1536 – June 1606) was the chief queen consort of King Nanda of Toungoo Dynasty of Burma (Myanmar) from 1581 to 1599. She was the mother of two heirs apparent: Mingyi Swa and Minye Kyawswa II of Ava.

== Brief ==
The queen was one of King Tabinshwehti's two children listed in the Burmese chronicles. Her mother may have been Dhamma Dewi. (Note: Though chronicles do not explicitly mention her mother's name, it is probable that the mother was Dhamma Dewi, one of the two chief queens of Tabinshwehti in the 1530s, based on the fact that the daughter achieved the chief queen status. Typically, daughters of senior queens were favored to become chief queens.)

The princess married her cousin Nanda, the heir-apparent, in 1551. They were at least half-cousins since her father Tabinshwehti and Nanda's mother Atula Thiri were half-siblings, and may have been double cousins if her mother was Dhamma Dewi since Nanda's father Bayinnaung and Dhamma Dewi were siblings. The couple had seven children (four daughters and three sons) from the 1550s to c. 1571. (Note: Since the third child Mingyi Swa was born on 27 November 1558 per (Ohn Shwe 1966: xxviii), they must have had the first child by 1556, if not earlier. The sixth child Minye Kyawswa II of Ava was born in Nadaw 929 ME (1 November to 30 November 1567) per (Zata 1960: 47). Their seventh and final child must have been born in late 1568 or early 1569 at the earliest. Furthermore, per (Maha Yazawin Vol. 2 2006: 324–335), Nanda was on military campaigns in Siam and Lan Xang between October 1568 to June 1570, arriving back at Pegu on 21 June 1570 (10th waxing of Waso 932 ME). This means their last child was most probably born in 1571 at the earliest.)

She became the chief queen in 1581 when Nanda ascended to the throne. Nanda presided over the collapse of the Toungoo Empire over the next 18 years. In 1599, her husband lost power, and the royal couple was sent to Toungoo (Taungoo) by the victor Minye Thihathu II of Toungoo. The victor kept the royal couple well at the palace but his son Natshinnaung assassinated the fallen king a year later. Minye Thihathu was dismayed, and protected the queen. He moved her to stay with her eldest daughter, who was married to his younger brother, Minye Kyawhtin (later known as Thado Dhamma Yaza), with a full retinue of attendants.

The queen spent her last years there, and died in June 1606.

== In popular culture ==
She is one of the characters in the thai television drama Kasattriya (กษัตริยา) in 2003 in name Chao nang Subhaya Portrayed by Panadda Wongphudee️️ and appeared in the scene of In Part of the King Naresuan film series, which a quarter of wife side seated of king Nanda Bayin. And she is the very prominent character of thai television dramas jomjai ayothaya (จอมใจอโยธยา) in 2025 in name ketsaratevi Portrayed by Anusara Wanthongthak., Thai television drama The Last Duel (หงสาวดี) (2026) Portrayed by Nutkritta Kaewrungruang.

== Bibliography ==
- Kala, U (1724). Maha Yazawin (in Burmese). Vol. 1–3 (2006, 4th printing ed.). Yangon: Ya-Pyei Publishing.
- Maha Sithu (1798). Myint Swe; Kyaw Win; Thein Hlaing (eds.). Yazawin Thit (in Burmese). Vol. 1–3 (2012, 2nd printing ed.). Yangon: Ya-Pyei Publishing.
- Ohn Shwe, U; Natshinnaung (1920). Natshinnaung Yadu Collection (in Burmese) (1966, 3rd printing ed.). Yangon: Hanthawaddy.
- Royal Historians of Burma (c. 1680). U Hla Tin (Hla Thamein) (ed.). Zatadawbon Yazawin (1960 ed.). Historical Research Directorate of the Union of Burma.

Hanthawaddy Mibaya Toungoo Dynasty Born: c. 1536 Died: June 1606
Royal titles
Preceded by Sanda Dewi	Chief queen consort of Burma; 10 November 1581 – 19 December 1599	Succeeded by Thiri Maha Dhamma Yaza Dipadi Dewi
Preceded by Atula Thiri	Princess consort of Burma; 11 January 1551 – 10 November 1581	Succeeded by Natshin Medaw
