= Baoshan =

Baoshan may refer to:

- Baoshan, Yunnan (云南省保山市), prefecture-level city
  - Baoshan Yunrui Airport (保山云瑞机场)
- Baoshan, Shanghai (上海市宝山区)
- Baoshan, Shuangyashan (双鸭山市宝山区), Heilongjiang
- Baoshan Road station (宝山路站), Shanghai Metro

== Towns (宝山镇) ==
- Baoshan, Beijing (zh), subdivision of Huairou District, Beijing
- Baoshan, Suihua (zh), subdivision of Beilin District, Suihua, Heilongjiang
- Baoshan, Inner Mongolia (zh), subdivision of Morin Banner, Inner Mongolia
- Baoshan, Liaoning (zh), subdivision of Fengcheng, Liaoning
- Baoshan, Shandong (zh), subdivision of Huangdao District, Qingdao, Shandong
- Baoshan, Xuanwei (zh), subdivision of Xuanwei, Yunnan

== Townships (宝山乡) ==
- Baoshan Township, Jiangxi (zh), subdivision of Wan'an County, Jiangxi
- Baoshan Township, Jilin (zh), subdivision of Panshi, Jilin
- Baoshan Township, Gannan County (zh), subdivision of Gannan County, Heilongjiang
- Baoshan Township, Xunke County (zh), subdivision of Xunke County, Heilongjiang
- Baoshan Township, Yunnan (zh), in Yulong Naxi Autonomous County, Yunnan
- Baoshan Township, Hsinchu County, Taiwan
