= Nandian =

Nandian (南甸镇) may refer to the following locations in China:

- Nandian, Hebei
- Nandian, Liaoning, in Benxi Manchu Autonomous County
