= Minkhaung II of Toungoo =

Minkhaung II of Toungoo တောင်ငူ မင်းခေါင် Thihathu of Toungoo
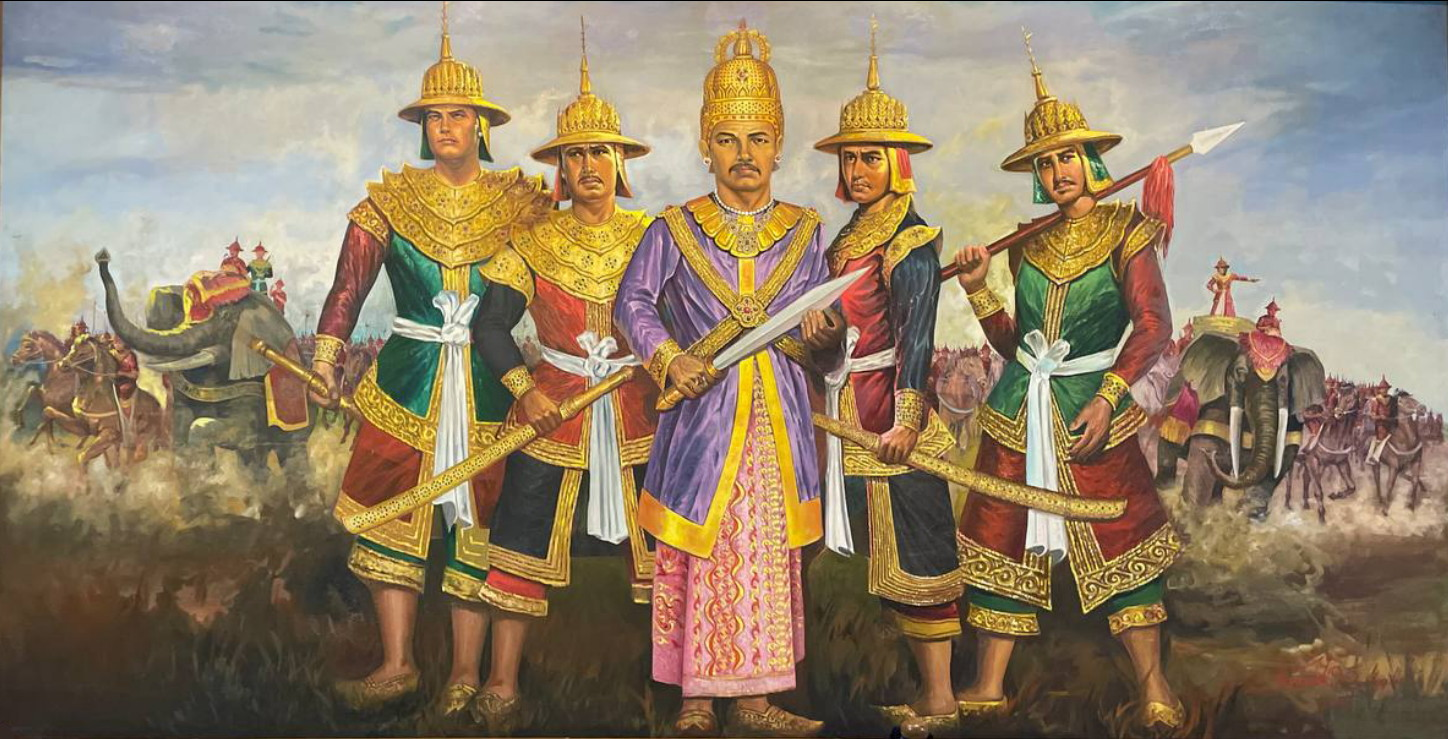
- This museum painting depicts King Bayintnaung (in the centre) and his brothers. Minkhaung II of Taungoo is the first figure to the king's right.

Viceroy of Toungoo
- Reign: March 1549 – 30 April 1550; 6 June 1552 – June 1584
- Predecessor: Mingyi Swe
- Successor: Minye Thihathu II
- Born: 1520s Toungoo (Taungoo)
- Died: June 1584; Waso 946 ME; Toungoo (Taungoo)
- Spouse: Laygyun Mibaya
- Issue among others...: two sons and four daughters including: Minye Thihathu II; Thado Dhamma Yaza; Min Phyu; Thiri Yaza Dewi; Min Htwe
- House: Toungoo
- Father: Mingyi Swe
- Mother: Sister of Shin Myo Myat
- Religion: Theravada Buddhism

Minkhaung II of Toungoo (Burmese: တောင်ငူ မင်းခေါင်, pronounced [tàʊɴŋù mɪ́ɴɡàʊɴ]; 1520s–1584) was viceroy of Toungoo (Taungoo) from 1549 to 1551 and from 1552 to 1584 during the reigns of kings Tabinshwehti, Bayinnaung and Nanda of Toungoo Dynasty of Burma (Myanmar). He briefly revolted against his eldest half-brother Bayinnaung from 1550 to 1551 but was pardoned by Bayinnaung. Alongside his brothers Bayinnaung, Minye Sithu, Thado Dhamma Yaza II, Thado Minsaw and his nephew Nanda, he fought in nearly every campaign between 1552 and 1584 that rebuilt, expanded and defended the Toungoo Empire.

Minkhaung II is the basis for Taungoo Mingaung, one of the Thirty Seven Nats in the official pantheon of Burmese spirits. The actual basis may have been Minkhaung I of Toungoo.

== Early life ==
He was born Zeya Nanda (ဇေယျနန္ဒ) (Note: Chronicles are inconsistent with the name Zeya Nanda. Maha Yazawin (Maha Yazawin Vol. 2 2006: 172) and Hmannan Yazawin (Hmannan Vol. 2 2003: 226) both say Zeya Nanda (later Minkhaung II) was married to Laygyun Mibaya in 1545. But later, chronicles (Maha Yazawin Vol. 2 2006: 201) and (Hmannan Vol. 2 2003: 264) referred to the man later known as Thado Minsaw of Ava as Zeya Nanda.) in the Toungoo Palace precincts to Mingyi Swe and the younger sister of Shin Myo Myat, royal household servants of Crown Prince Tabinshwehti. He had an elder half-sister, Dhamma Dewi, three elder half-brothers, Bayinnaung and Minye Sithu, Thado Dhamma Yaza II and a younger full-brother Thado Minsaw. He was likely born in the late 1520s since his younger brother Thado Minsaw was born in May 1531. (Note: (Zata 1960: 79): Thado Minsaw was born on Saturday, 5th waxing of Nayon 893 ME (20 May 1531).) He grew up in the palace precincts, and received a military-style education there.

== Tabinshwehti era ==
Zeya Nanda came of age at a time when his native Toungoo was in the process of building the largest polity in Burma since the late 13th century. Although he probably joined his older brothers in Tabinshwehti's later military campaigns in the 1540s, he had not achieved a regimental commander status to be mentioned in the chronicles. His name does not appear in the commander lists down to the last campaigns of Tabinshwehti: Arakan (1545–47) and Siam (1547–1549).

At any rate, the king was apparently impressed by the young man's ability. When viceroy of Toungoo Mingyi Swe died in March 1549, the king named Zeya Nanda successor with the title of Thihathu (သီဟသူ). Though it was a governorship, as opposed to a viceroyship, the appointment was still an impressive achievement for the young man as he was selected over his older and more experienced brothers Minye Sithu and Thado Dhamma Yaza II both of whom had been commanders since 1540, and over the objections of ministers concerned by handing over the ancestral home of the dynasty to a relatively inexperienced youngster. The ministers actually recommended Bayinnaung but the king rejected, saying that Bayinnaung was already his heir-apparent.

== Bayinnaung era ==
=== In rebellion ===
Now styled as Thihathu, he remained Tabinshwehti's favorite. In January/February 1550 (Tabodwe 911 ME), the king entrusted him to administer Pegu (Bago) while he went on a months-long hunting trip and Bayinnaung was on the campaign in the Irrawaddy delta to suppress a rebellion. Three months into his stay at Pegu, he received word that the king had been assassinated. Although Tabinshwehti had chosen Bayinnaung as his successor since 1542, governors and viceroys of major regions all declared themselves king. Thihathu was no exception. He immediately returned to Toungoo and declared himself king with the title of Minkhaung (မင်းခေါင်).

But all his other brothers remained loyal to their eldest brother. In September 1550, Bayinnaung's forces (9600 men, 200 horses, 20 elephants, 200 war boats) laid siege to Toungoo. Minkhaung resisted for four months but finally surrendered on 11 January 1551. Remarkably, Bayinnaung forgave his brother, saying that their father had wanted all the brothers to remain united like the five fingers of the hand.

=== In Bayinnaung's service ===
Minkhaung was overcome by Bayinnaung's pardon, and proved to be a loyal brother and an effective military commander for the rest of their lives. He immediately redeemed himself by leading the successful attack on Prome (Pyay) on 30 August 1551. He is said to have led the charge on the city walls, rammed his war elephant through the badly damaged massive wooden doors of the main gate, entered the city.

The following is a list of campaigns he participated in during the reign of Bayinnaung. (He did not participate in Manipur in 1560 or Mohnyin/Mogaung in 1571.)

Campaign	Duration	Troops commanded	Notes
Prome	1551	1 regiment	Led the charge that broke through the defenses on 30 August 1551
Hanthawaddy	1552	1 regiment	Served under his younger brother Thado Minsaw who commanded the army group. Did not see any action. Was not part of the armies that followed Smim Htaw to the Irrawaddy delta
Ava	1554–1555	7 regiments	Led a vanguard army that invaded Ava via Yamethin from the right flank while Thado Minsaw led another army that invaded via Pintale from the center. The two armies drove back Avan defenses into the city walls. After Ava fell, the two armies by Minkhaung and Thado Minsaw followed up on the armies of Mohnyin, Mogaung, and Kale in the Mu valley and defeated them there.
Shan states	1557	an army	Led an army. Along with Thado Minsaw's and Nanda's army, his army converged on to Thibaw, part of a three-pronged attack. Led a rearguard army to the march to Mohnyin and Mogaung.
Mone	1557	8000	Led an army but did not see any action. Thado Dhamma Yaza II's vanguard army took Mone.
Lan Na	1558	10 regiments	Led the rearguard army, following Bayinnaung's central army and three vanguard armies led by Thado Dhamma Yaza II, Thado Minsaw, and Nanda.
Trans-Salween Chinese Shan states	1563	12,000	Led one of the four armies that invaded the trans-Salween states. His army invaded from Thibaw.
Siam	1563–1564	14,000	He and Nanda jointly-attacked and conquered Sukhothai in December 1563. Attacked the fort defending Ayutthaya. (Note: (Maha Yazawin Vol. 2 2006: 267, footnote #1): Maha Yazawin does not mention him in the commander list although it does mention later. Both Yazawin Thit and Hmannan Yazawin (Hmannan Vol. 2 2003: 348) do.)
Lan Na	1564	12,000	One of four armies that marched to Chiang Mai from Ayutthaya. From Chiang Mai, marched to Chiang Saen and secured allegiance there.
Siam	1568–1569	11,000	Led one of the five armies that invaded Siam.
Lan Xang	1569–1570	11,000	Led of one of the three armies that invaded Lan Xang from the middle. His army consisted of 11 regiments along with Bayinnaung's main army. Took Vientiane in February 1570.
Lan Xang	1574	11,000	Led one of four armies, which took Lan Xang without a fight.
Mohnyin and Mogaung	1575–1576	an army	His army did not see any action.

He was appointed viceroy of Toungoo on 6 June 1552 (Monday, 14th waxing of Waso 914 ME).

He built the Toungoo gate of Pegu (Bago) when the capital was rebuilt between 1565 and 1568. (Each of the twenty gates of the new capital was built by key vassal rulers.) For their loyal service, Thado Dhamma Yaza II, Minkhaung II and Thado Minsaw were all honored by their brother the king on 3 March 1580.

== Nanda era ==
Bayinnaung died on 10 October 1581, and was succeeded by his son Nanda. The new king faced an impossible task of maintaining an empire ruled by autonomous viceroys who were loyal to Bayinnaung, not the kingdom of Toungoo. In June 1583, Thado Minsaw, the viceroy of Ava, sent secret embassies to Prome, Toungoo and Chiang Mai to launch a simultaneous revolt against Nanda. Minkhaung II and the other viceroys sided with Nanda. When Nanda marched to Ava in March 1584, he along with the rulers of Prome and Chiang Mai also marched to Ava. Ava turned out to be Minkhaung's last campaign. He died in June 1584. He was succeeded by his eldest son styled as Minye Thihathu II of Toungoo.

== Family ==
His chief queen was Laygyun Mibaya, a daughter of King Bayin Htwe of Prome. They were married in 1545 at the coronation ceremony of Tabinshwehti at the Pegu Palace. The couple had five children (two sons and three daughters). They were:

1. Minye Thihathu II, King of Toungoo (1597–1609)
2. Thado Dhamma Yaza (personal name Ba Saw Phyu), Gov. of Kawliya
3. Min Phyu of Toungoo, Queen of the Southern Palace of Burma (1583–96)
4. Khin Hpone Htut, Queen of the Northern Palace of Burma (1583–99)
5. Min Htwe, Queen of the Central Palace of Burma (1583–99)

He also had a daughter by a concubine.

1. Min Hpone Myat
2. Thiri Yadana

== In popular culture ==
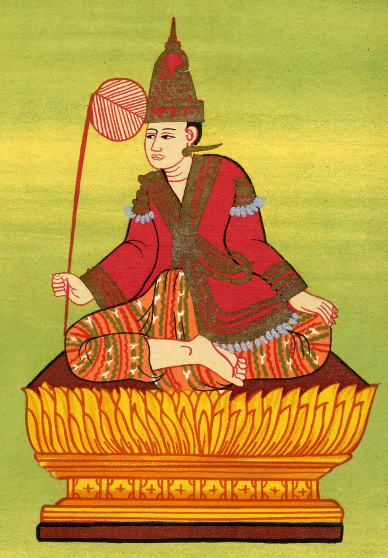
Taungoo Mingaung nat

Minkhaung II has been referred to as the basis for the Taungoo Mingaung nat, one of the Thirty Seven Nats in the official pantheon. Based on the nature of his death, however, Minkhaung II, who died of natural causes, may not be the basis. On the other hand, Minkhaung I (r. 1446–51) was brutally assassinated. Given that death from violent murders is one of the main criteria for being inducted into the pantheon, Minkhaung I is probably the basis for the nat.

== Bibliography ==
- Hla Thamein. "Thirty-Seven Nats". Yangonow. Archived from the original on 2006-06-24.
- Htin Aung, Maung (1967). A History of Burma. New York and London: Cambridge University Press.
- Kala, U (1724). Maha Yazawin (in Burmese). Vol. 1–3 (2006, 4th printing ed.). Yangon: Ya-Pyei Publishing.
- Royal Historians of Burma (c. 1680). U Hla Tin (Hla Thamein) (ed.). Zatadawbon Yazawin (1960 ed.). Historical Research Directorate of the Union of Burma.
- Royal Historical Commission of Burma (1832). Hmannan Yazawin (in Burmese). Vol. 1–3 (2003 ed.). Yangon: Ministry of Information, Myanmar.
- Sein Lwin Lay, Kahtika U (1968). Mintaya Shwe Hti and Bayinnaung: Ketumadi Taungoo Yazawin (in Burmese) (2006, 2nd printing ed.). Yangon: Yan Aung Sarpay.

Minkhaung II of Toungoo Toungoo Dynasty Born: c. 1520s Died: June 1584
Royal titles
Preceded by Mingyi Swe	Viceroy of Toungoo; March 1549 – 30 April 1550; 6 June 1552 – June 1584	Succeeded by Minye Thihathu II
