= Hla Thamein =

Burmese scholar and writer

- လှသမိန်
- Born: Hla Tin; 7 February 1923; Letpadan, British Burma
- Died: 12 January 2000 (aged 76); Yangon, Myanmar
- Occupations: Scholar; writer

Hla Thamein (Burmese: လှသမိန်; 7 February 1923 – 12 January 2000) was a Burmese scholar and writer, specializing in Burmese culture, the Burmese language, and Burmese history.

== Early life and education ==
Hla Thamein was born Hla Tin on 7 February 1923, in the town of Letpadan, British Burma, near Pegu (now Bago), and grew up in Okpho. He matriculated from high school in 1945.

== Career ==
Hla Thamein began working at the Guide Daily Press in 1946 and other printing presses for 7 years. From there, he joined the Burma Translation Office, and became appointed as a senior culture officer at the Ministry of Culture, rising to become the chief editor at the Myanmar Language Commission until his retirement in 1980.

Throughout his career, he wrote almost 200 books, thousands of journal articles, and published a few research works. He also taught Burmese to foreign diplomatic corps.

Together with Madamme Benot he compiled French-Burmese and Burmese-French dictionaries. He also helped Arremiri Aschi to compile Burmese-German and German-Burmese dictionaries.

== Death and legacy ==
Hla Thamein died on 12 January 2000 in Yangon. His son, Hla Phone Aung, is also a writer and editor.

== Publications ==
Note: Hla Thamein's name is romanized as "Lha Saminʻ " in Western libraries.

- Dictionnaire birman-français
- Birmanisches Marionettentheater
