= Sanda Dewi =

Sanda Dewi စန္ဒာဒေဝီ

Chief queen consort of Burma
- Tenure: 15 June 1568 – 10 October 1581
- Predecessor: Atula Thiri Maha Yaza Dewi
- Successor: Hanthawaddy Mibaya

Queen of the Northern Palace
- Tenure: April 1553 – 15 June 1568
- Predecessor: Khin Myat
- Successor: Thiri Yaza Dewi

Chief queen consort of Prome
- Tenure: December 1532 – 19 May 1542
- Predecessor: Shwe Zin Gon
- Successor: Salin Mibaya
- Born: 1517/1518 (Note: Chronicles (Maha Yazawin Vol. 2 2006: 111) and (Hmannan Vol. 2 2003: 133) say she was 7 (in eighth year) when she was taken prisoner at Ava/Inwa (on 22 March 1525 per (Sein Lwin Lay 2006: 105–106)) to Prome/Pyay.); Ava
- Died: 1580s? Pegu?
- Spouse: Narapati of Prome; Minkhaung of Prome; Bayinnaung
- Issue: A son (by Minkhaung); Min Khin Saw (by Bayinnaung)
Names
- Sanda Dewi; Birth name: Thiri Hpone Htut
- House: Ava
- Father: Narapati II of Ava
- Mother: Dhamma Dewi of Ava
- Religion: Theravada Buddhism

Sanda Dewi (Burmese: စန္ဒာဒေဝီ [sàɰ̃dà dèwì]; Pali: Candādevī) was one of the three principal queens of King Bayinnaung of Burma from 1553 to 1581. She was also a queen of the last two kings of Prome Kingdom from 1532 to 1542. She was the maternal grandmother of Natshinnaung, king of Toungoo.

== Brief ==
The queen was born Thiri Hpone Htut (သီရိဘုန်းထွဋ် [θìɹḭ pʰóʊɰ̃ tʰʊʔ]) to King Shwenankyawshin of Ava and Queen Dhamma Dewi in 1517/1518. After her father was killed in action against the forces of the Confederation of Shan States and the Prome Kingdom on 25 March 1527, the young princess was brought to Prome (Pyay) by King Thado Minsaw of Prome. Later at Prome, she was married to one of Thado Minsaw's grandsons, King Narapati who ruled from 1532 to 1539. After Narapati died, she was married to his younger brother Minkhaung. She had a son with Minkhaung.

When Prome fell to Toungoo forces in May 1542, the king and queen of Prome were sent to Toungoo. But c. April 1553, Minkhaung was executed for suspicion of plotting against Bayinnaung. Thiri Hpone Htut then became Bayinnaung's queen, with the title of Sanda Dewi. They had a daughter, Khin Saw, who was mother of Natshinnaung, the future rebel king of Toungoo.

== Ancestry ==
Ancestry of Queen Sanda Dewi

8. Thihathura of Ava
4. Minkhaung II
9. Ameitta Thiri Maha Dhamma Dewi of Ava
2. Narapati II of Ava
10. Thihapate I of Pakhan
5. Atula Thiri Dhamma Dewi of Ava
11. Shwe Einthi of Twinthin
1. Sanda Dewi
12. Thihapate I of Pakhan
6. Thihapate II of Pakhan
13. Shwe Einthi of Twinthin
3. Dhamma Dewi of Ava
7. (unnamed)

== In popular culture ==
She was portrayed by Kanang Damronghat in the 2003 Thai television drama Kasattriya (กษัตริยา) under the name Phra Raja Devi Chandra, and appeared the King Naresuan film series, seated next to King Bayinnaung., Thai television drama The Last Duel (หงสาวดี) (2026) Portrayed by Chalisa Chawb.

== Bibliography ==
- Harvey, G. E. (1925). History of Burma: From the Earliest Times to 10 March 1824. London: Frank Cass & Co. Ltd.
- Kala, U (1724). Maha Yazawin (in Burmese). Vol. 1–3 (2006, 4th printing ed.). Yangon: Ya-Pyei Publishing.
- Royal Historical Commission of Burma (1832). Hmannan Yazawin (in Burmese). Vol. 1–3 (2003 ed.). Yangon: Ministry of Information, Myanmar.
- Sein Lwin Lay, Kahtika U (1968). Mintaya Shwe Hti and Bayinnaung: Ketumadi Taungoo Yazawin (in Burmese) (2006, 2nd printing ed.). Yangon: Yan Aung Sarpay.

Sanda Dewi Toungoo Dynasty Born: 1517 Died: c. 1580s
Royal titles
Preceded by Atula Thiri	Chief queen consort of Burma; 15 June 1568 – 10 October 1581	Succeeded by Hanthawaddy Mibaya
Preceded by Khin Myat	Queen of the Northern Palace; April 1553– 15 June 1568	Succeeded by Thiri Yaza Dewi
Preceded by Shwe Zin Gon	Chief queen consort of Prome; December 1532 – 19 May 1542	Succeeded by Salin Mibaya
