= Minye Thihathu II of Toungoo =

Maha Dhamma Yaza မဟာဓမ္မရာဇာ မင်းရဲသီဟသူ Minye Thihathu II of Toungoo

King of Toungoo
- Reign: c. February 1597 – 11 August 1609
- Coronation: 21 March 1603
- Predecessor: Minkhaung II
- Successor: Natshinnaung

Viceroy of Toungoo
- Reign: June 1584 – c. February 1597
- Predecessor: Minkhaung II
- Successor: Natshinnaung
- Born: c. 6 August 1550; Wednesday, c. 7th waning of Wagaung 912 ME; Toungoo (Taungoo)
- Died: 11 August [O.S. 1 August] 1609; Tuesday, 11th waxing of Wagaung 971 ME (aged ~59); Toungoo (Taungoo)
- Spouse: Min Khin Saw; Myo Myat Hpone Wai
- Issue: Natshinnaung; Minye Kyawswa of Toungoo; Minye Thihathu III; Minye Kyawhtin II of Kawliya; Khin Shwe Nan
- House: Toungoo
- Father: Minkhaung II of Toungoo
- Mother: Laygyun Mibaya
- Religion: Theravada Buddhism

Minye Thihathu II of Toungoo (Burmese: မင်းရဲ သီဟသူ, pronounced [mɪ́ɴjɛ́ θìha̰ðù]; c. 6 August 1550 – 11 August 1609) was king of the breakaway kingdom of Toungoo (Taungoo) from 1597 to 1609. His kingdom was one of several small states that emerged following the collapse of Toungoo Empire. He is best known in Burmese history for his role in the sack of Pegu (Bago) in 1599 that ended the Toungoo Empire.

He was viceroy of Toungoo from 1584 to 1597 during the reign of his first cousin King Nanda. After breaking away, he entered into an alliance with King Raza II of Arakan, and they captured Pegu in December 1599. The allies thoroughly looted the city before burning it down two months later. They also drove back a Siamese invasion, and agreed to jointly administer Lower Burma outside of Siamese-controlled Martaban (Mottama). But they lost control of Lower Burma in 1603 when the Portuguese governor of Syriam (Thanlyin) in the service of Arakan switched sides to Portuguese Goa. The allies' attempt to regain Syriam in 1603–04 failed.

He spent his last years rebuilding the city of Toungoo and other war ravaged regions around his kingdom. But he also saw his kingdom increasingly boxed in by the Portuguese from the south and Ava (Inwa) from the north. He died a year before Ava took over Toungoo.

== Background ==
Minye Thihathu was the eldest child of Viceroy Minkhaung II of Toungoo and his chief consort Laygyun Mibaya, and was born in Toungoo (Taungoo) c. 6 August 1550. (Note: Inferred from chronicle reporting, his birth date was one of the following: 30 July 1550 (Full moon of Wagaung 912 ME), 6 August 1550 (7th waning of Wagaung 912), or 13 August 1550 (14th waning of Wagaung 912). Chronicles (Maha Yazawin Vol. 3 2006: 108) and (Hmannan Vol. 3 2003: 114) say that he commissioned a new palace at age 52 years and 3 months (3 months into 53rd year), and occupied the new palace at 52 years and 7 months (7 months into 53rd year). According to (Maha Yazawin Vol. 3 2006: 104), he commissioned a new palace at his coronation ceremony on 8th waxing of Nadaw 964 ME (21 November 1602) and entered the new palace on 10th waxing of Late Tagu 964 ME (21 March 1603). It means he was born on or after 11th waxing of Wagaung 912 (24 July 1550) and on or before 8th waxing of Tawthalin 912 ME (19 August 1550). But since he was a Wednesday born, he was born on 30 July, 6 August or 13 August 1550.) His father was a half brother of King Bayinnaung of the Toungoo dynasty. His mother was a daughter of King Bayin Htwe of Prome (Pyay), and great-granddaughter of King Narapati of Ava. He was born during his father brief insurrection against Bayinnaung, following the assassination of King Tabinshwehti. He had four full siblings (a brother and three sisters) and a half-sister.

Ancestry of Minye Thihathu II

8. Taungkha Min
4. Minye Thihathu I of Toungoo
9. Kayenawaddy
2. Minkhaung II of Toungoo
10. Kywe Sit Min
5. Sister of Shin Myo Myat
11. (Unnamed)
1. Minye Thihathu II
12. Thado Minsaw of Prome
6. Bayin Htwe of Prome
13. Myat Hpone Pyo
3. Laygyun Mibaya
14. Minye Kyawswa II of Kalay
7. Chit Mi of Prome
15. Min Hpone Htut of Prome

== Early career ==
=== Governor of Tharrawaddy (c. 1564–74) ===
Although chronicles provide no details on his early life, the young prince apparently made an impression on his uncle the king. When he was about 14, he was appointed governor of Tharrawaddy (Thayawadi), a small town in present-day Bago Region, with the style of Minye Kyawhtin (မင်းရဲကျော်ထင်). In October 1564, the king gave his 14-year-old nephew the command of the 12,000-man Fifth Army for the upcoming Lan Na and Lan Xang campaigns. While it was not unusual that a young Burmese prince was asked to go to the front, it was uncommon that the 14-year-old was given such a high position. Five other army commanders of the 64,000-strong invasion force were the king, the crown prince, his father, and his two other uncles, all of whom were at least a generation older, and had plenty of military experience. To be sure, he was there to represent the high king in an army largely consisted of Siamese regiments. In fact, his Siamese "deputies" all had prior military experience. (Note: (Maha Yazawin Vol. 2 2006: 268–272): Governors of Phitsanulok, Sukhothai and Sawankhalok initially, briefly fought against Bayinnaung's invasion forces in 1563 before joining them. They participated in Bayinnaung's subsequent capture of Ayutthaya in February 1564.)

His army participated in the capture of Vientiane in January 1565, and spent months trekking the Laotian hills in their fruitless pursuit of King Setthathirat of Lan Xang. He had already turned 15 when he arrived back at Pegu (Bago) in October 1565. In October 1568, he was again called to lead the 5000-strong Fifth Army, made up of troops from Lan Na and Kengtung, to put down rebellions in southern Siam and Lan Xang. Southern Siam's rebellion was put down in August 1569 but Lan Xang remained at large. Like in 1565, his army participated in the 1569 invasion of Lan Xang.

At age 20, he was married to his half-cousin Min Khin Saw, daughter of Bayinnaung by Queen Sanda Dewi on 1 May 1571.

=== Heir-apparent of Toungoo (1574–84) ===
In 1574, he returned to his native Toungoo, and became the heir-apparent there. He participated in two more military campaigns in the remaining years of Bayinnaung. He led an army in the 1575–76 campaign against a rebellion in the northern Shan states of Mohnyin and Mogaung. He was the co-commander-in-chief of the Arakan campaign in 1581. But his armies saw little action as the campaign was called off soon after King Bayinnaung's death in October 1581 by the new king Nanda.

He returned to a deceptively calm country, which then was "probably the largest empire in the history of Southeast Asia" and an "absurdly overextended empire". The transfer of power had gone smoothly; all key major vassal rulers, who ruled what until recently used to be sovereign kingdoms, initially pledged allegiance to the new king, while adopting a wait-and-see attitude. For his part, Nanda did not trust his vassals especially his own kinsmen Minkhaung II of Toungoo and Thado Minsaw of Ava. When Thado Minsaw revolted in 1583–84, Minkhaung sided with Nanda, who suppressed the rebellion in April 1584.

== Viceroy of Toungoo (1584–97) ==
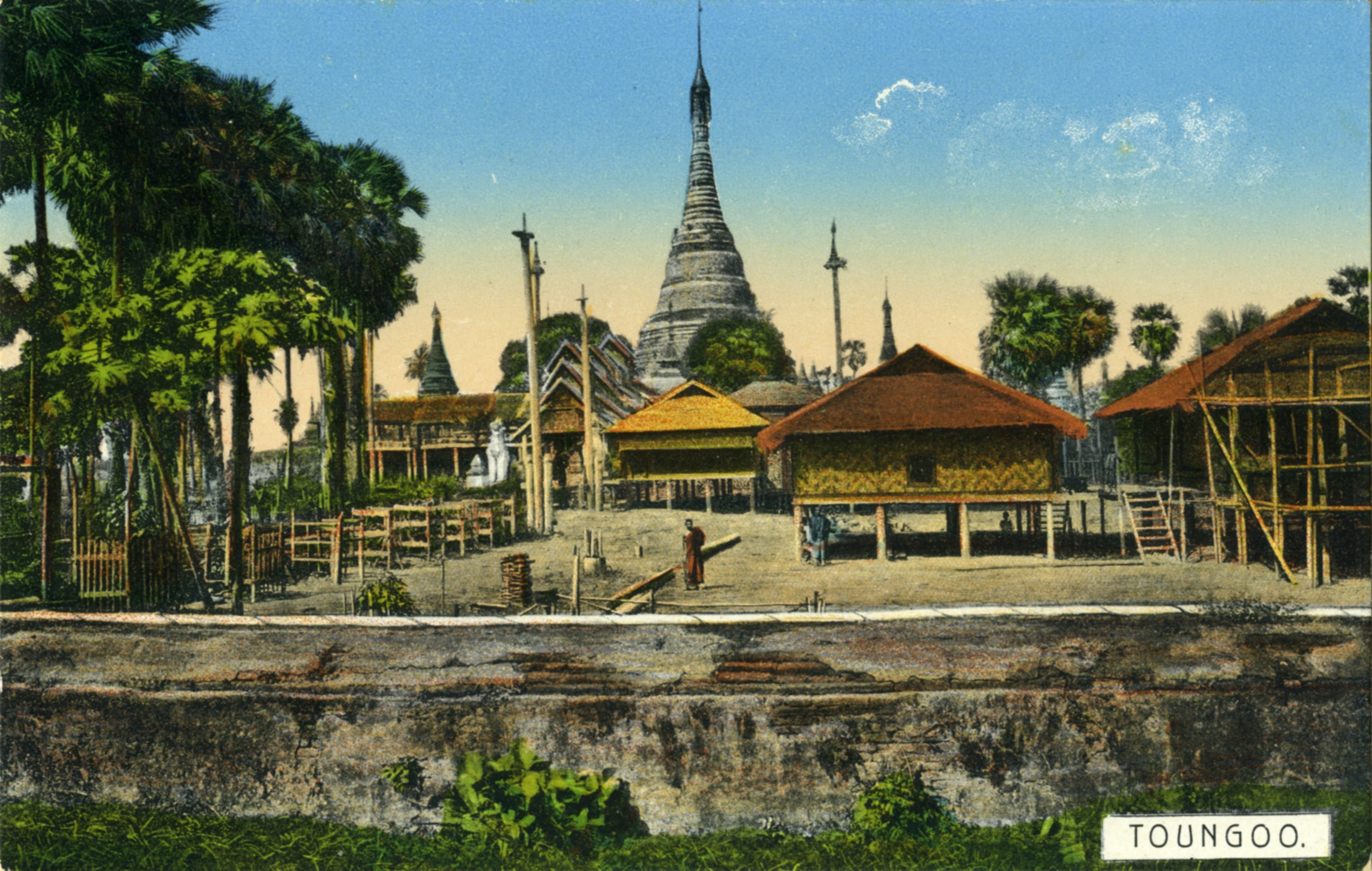
Old Toungoo c. 1900

=== Nominal vassal ===
Minkhaung's support of Nanda was crucial in his son succeeding him as viceroy. Less than two months after the Ava campaign, in June 1584, Minkhaung died. Nanda agreed to Minye Kyawhtin's accession, granting him the title Minye Thihathu, King of Toungoo, the same style used by their grandfather Mingyi Swe. For his part, Minye Thihathu II pledged loyalty to his half-cousin, and brother-in-law.

However, he and other vassal rulers were only nominally loyal to the high king. They used Nanda's preoccupation with Siam, which revolted in May 1584, to gain greater autonomy for themselves, only contributing nominally to the war effort. In all, Minye Thihathu went to the front only in the 1586–87 invasion of Siam, contributing just two regiments (2000 men). He sent a single regiment each in the 1590–91 and 1592–93 invasions. He provided no support in suppressing the 1590–92 rebellion in Mogaung (present-day Kachin State).

=== In defense of Lower Burma (1594–95) ===
The period of relative autonomy ended in 1593. By then, all five invasions of Siam (1584–93) had ended in failure, and Nanda had finally given up on winning back Siam. He now turned his attention to reasserting his authority closer to home. Minye Thihathu had to pay attention because Toungoo was surrounded on three sides by the states ruled by Nanda and his sons (Ava in the north, Prome in the west and Pegu in the south). When Nanda asked him to lead an army to put down a Siam-backed rebellion in Moulmein (Mawlamyaing) in October 1594, he agreed. But his 8,000-man army was badly defeated outside Moulmein by the Siamese army. At Pegu, Minye Thihathu was severely reprimanded by Nanda, before being allowed to return to Toungoo.

But he was soon asked for help again by Nanda. In December 1594, a 12,000-strong Siamese army led by King Naresuan laid siege to Pegu. Nanda had not expected an invasion of Pegu itself, and in desperation asked Prome, Toungoo and Lan Na for help. Minye Thihathu was in no hurry. Since he could not break the siege on his own in any case, he reinforced his city's defenses while he waited for the troops from Lan Na to arrive. It was only in March that he left with his army alongside Lan Na troops for Pegu. He left his eldest son Natshinnaung in charge of the fortified city.

The combined Toungoo and Lan Na armies broke the four-month-old siege, and drove back the Siamese army on 6 April [O.S. 27 March] 1595. Meanwhile, Prome forces led by Thado Dhamma Yaza III of Prome, instead of breaking the siege at Pegu, revolted against his father Nanda, and marched to Toungoo in a brazen attempt to consolidate central Burma. The Prome army laid siege to Toungoo for two weeks, and retreated only after Minye Thihathu rushed back with his army.

=== Break from Pegu ===
By then, everyone was out entirely for himself. Prome had taken over western central Burma up to Pakhan in the north. After the close call, Minye Thihathu decided to defend his own turf, and not help Nanda. Other vassals came to the same conclusion. Then in 1597 Nanda ordered that the rulers of Toungoo, Lan Na and Upper Burma send their first born sons to Pegu, essentially to be kept as hostages. They all refused. Minye Thihathu and Nawrahta Minsaw both formally renounced all tributary ties to Nanda. Others like Nyaungyan of Upper Burma and Vorapita of Lan Xang may not have formally declared independence but they essentially broke away as well. (Note: Chronicles say Nyaungyan never formally declared independence but surviving royal orders by Nyaungyan indicate that he did. (Than Tun Vol. 2 1985: 11): Nyaungyan without Nanda's permission declared that Ava would be his capital on 19 April 1597. (Than Tun Vol. 1 1983: 18–19): On 14 November 1598 (1st waning of Tazaungmon 960 ME), Nyaungyan declared the extent of his kingdom as the Toungoo Empire at its peak. (Stuart-Fox 2008: 38): Lan Xang did not officially renounce tributary ties to Burma until 1603.)

== King of Toungoo (1597–1609) ==
=== Conquest of Pegu (1598–99) ===
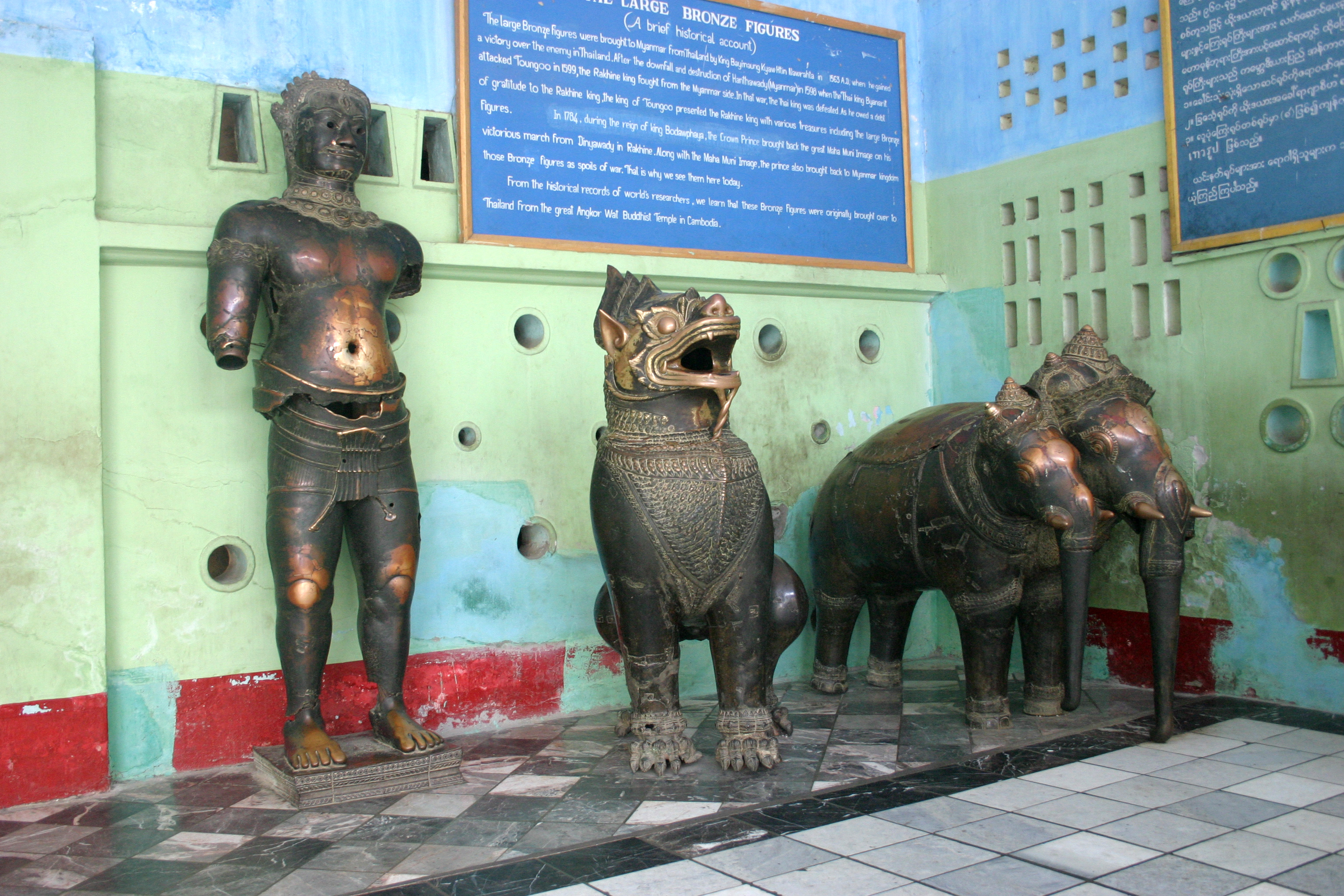
Surviving Khmer bronze statue of the 30 statues taken from Ayutthaya in 1564, taken to Mrauk-U in 1600 by the Arakanese, and to Amarapura in 1785 by Thado Minsaw.

Nanda was in a free fall. Over the next year, his power further deteriorated in the two remaining regions he still ruled: the Pegu province and the Irrawaddy delta. Most able bodied men had fled elsewhere. Minye Thihathu eyed Pegu for the city's enormous riches as well as access to maritime trade of Lower Burma. He entered into an alliance with King Raza II of Arakan. The allies agreed to a joint attack on whatever remained of the empire, and share the spoils. He chose Arakan, the farthest kingdom, figuring that after getting their share of the loot, the Arakanese would return home and not be a rival for Lower Burma.

In March 1598, Minye Thihathu moved deep into Pegu's territory, posting a 5000-man army at Kawliya, 60 km northeast of Pegu. On 10 November [O.S. 31 October] 1598, 30,000-strong Arakanese land and naval forces left Mrauk-U for Lower Burma. The Arakanese navy seized the main port city of Syriam (Thanlyin) in March 1599. In April, the allies laid siege to Pegu. About nine months into the siege, Nanda's heir-apparent Minye Kyawswa defected on a promise of good treatment but was promptly executed. After the defection, the king surrendered on 19 December [O.S. 9 December] 1599. The fallen king and his family were sent to Toungoo.

The victors divided the enormous wealth of Pegu, accumulated over the past 60 years as the capital of Toungoo Empire. The gold, silver and precious stones were equally divided. The Arakanese share included several brazen cannon, 30 Khmer bronze statues, and a white elephant. Toungoo got the Tooth relic and Alms Bowl of Ceylon and other sacred religious artifacts. Toungoo's share of the loot alone totaled more than a dozen caravans, each consisting of 700 elephants and horses. Meanwhile, they received the news that King Naresuan and his army were marching toward Lower Burma. While he planned to hold Lower Burma, Minye Thihathu's first priority was to get the loot to the secure confines of Toungoo. On 15 February [O.S. 5 February] 1600, (Note: Date per Hmannan Yazawin chronicle (Hmannan Vol. 3 2003: 103): 2nd waxing of Tabaung 961 ME = 15 February 1600. Maha Yazawin gives 8th waxing of Tabaung 961 ME (21 February 1600 NS).) he and his army returned with their loot to Toungoo, leaving the Arakanese in charge of the city. The Arakanese army methodically stripped the palace and the city of whatever remaining treasures, and set fire to the city. The Kanbawzathadi Palace and the city of Pegu, rebuilt by Bayinnaung in 1565–68 was burned down. The Arakanese then left for Syriam, and shipped the loot off to Mrauk-U. The Toungoo Empire, "the most adventurous and militarily successful in the country's history", ceased to exist.

Nareusan and his army arrived at Pegu on 23 February [O.S. 13 February] 1600, (Note: (Damrong 2001: 162) says Naresusan arrived at Pegu on the 10th waxing day of Fourth Siamese month, eight days after the viceroy of Toungoo left. But the editor (Chris Baker) or the translator (Aung Thein) inserted/translated the Fourth Siamese month as April. When Damrong wrote it in the 1920s, the Siamese calendar had not changed to the present day form: The First Siamese month was Mikkhasira (มิคสิร), not January as mandated in 1941. Thus, the Fourth Siamese month in Damrong's time would still have been (Phakkhun, ผัคคุณ), which is equivalent to the Burmese month Tabaung. And since Hmannan says Minye Thihathu left Pegu on 2nd waxing of Tabaung, and since Naresuan arrived eight days later, Naresuan arrived on 10th waxing of Phakkhun/Tabaung 961 ME.) only to find a smoldering deserted city. Without realizing that the Arakanese forces were still in Syriam to the south, he marched north.

=== Siamese invasion of Lower Burma (1600) ===
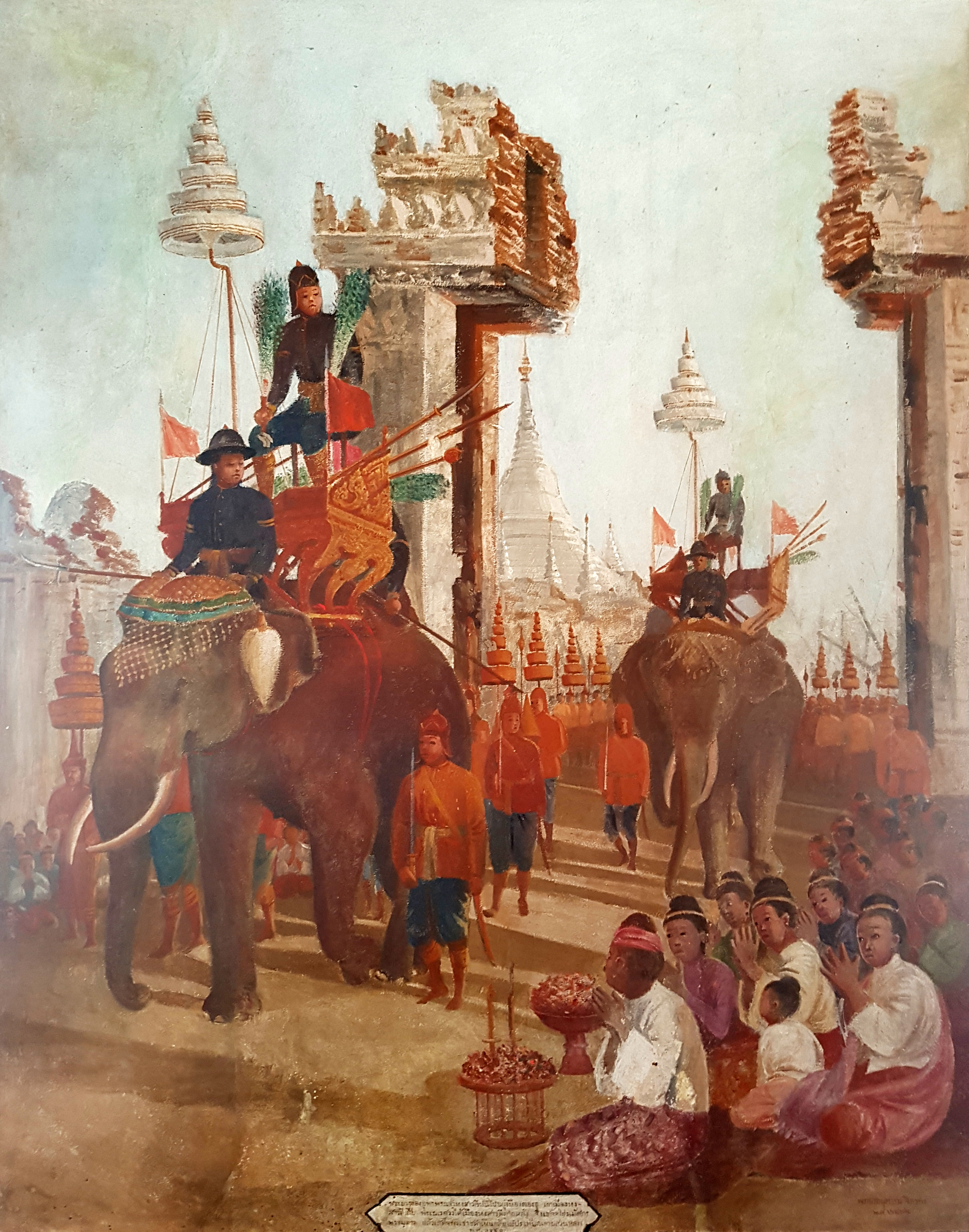
Thai depiction of Naresuan entering Pegu in 1600

Minye Thihathu and his army arrived back at Toungoo on 3 March [O.S. 22 February] 1600. Naresuan and the Siamese army arrived a few weeks later, and laid siege to the city. The Siamese troops tried to drain the city's moats by building a channel to the Paunglaung river. But the ambitious plan was cut short when their supplies stopped coming. The Arakanese forces, which Naresuan had not counted on remaining in Lower Burma, had been cutting off Siamese supply lines, and had returned to Pegu. Faced with the possibility of being encircled, Naresuan called off the siege on 6 May [O.S. 26 April] 1600, (Note: (Maha Yazawin Vol. 3 2006: 101) and (Hmannan Vol. 3 2003: 105): Saturday, 10th waning of Kason 962 ME = 6 May 1600.) and made a break for the border. But he had to go through a gauntlet of Arakanese ambushes, and took heavy losses before reaching the border. Still, Nareusan had successfully extended his control to the entire Tenasserim coast to Martaban (Mottama).

=== Sharing control of Lower Burma with Arakan ===
With the Siamese threat still so close, Minye Thihathu agreed to holding Lower Burma together with Arakan. He may not have had a choice in the matter especially since it was the Arakanese that primarily defeated the Siamese invasion. In a key concession, he agreed to Arakanese control of Syriam, the main port of Lower Burma in exchange for a share of the tax revenue from the port. In June 1600, King Raza appointed a Portuguese captain named Filipe de Brito e Nicote (Note: The standard chronicles give the name as Nga Zinga. Mainstream (Western) scholarship identifies Nga Zinga as Filipe de Brito e Nicote. But per (Than Tun 2011: 128–141), Pawtugi Yazawin, the history of the Portuguese written by their descendants, says De Brito was neither Nga Zinga nor governor of Syriam.) in his service as governor, and left a garrison consisted mainly of foreign mercenaries.

Despite his dependence on Syriam's revenues, Minye Thihathu did nothing when other rulers tried to take over the port. In 1601, the Syriam garrison repulsed two separate attacks by Yan Naing, the lord of Prome, and Binnya Law, a Mon lord. Later in the year, the garrison came under siege by Binnya Dala, the Siamese appointed viceroy of Martaban, for seven months until May 1602. Binnya Dala then made peace with De Brito in a marriage of alliance between his daughter and De Brito's son Simon. All the while, Minye Thihathu kept a series of garrisons near Syriam and Martaban to prevent the warfare from spilling over but nothing else. By then, even the authority of the Arakanese king over the Portuguese led garrison was nominal. De Brito had been in contact with Aires de Saldanha, Viceroy of Goa, to make Syriam a Portuguese colony.

=== Coronation ===
On 21 March [O.S. 11 March] 1603, Minye Thihathu was crowned king with the title of Maha Dhamma Yaza (မဟာဓမ္မရာဇာ) while his chief queen took the title of Atula Agga Maha Dewi (အတုလအဂ္ဂ မဟာဒေဝီ). His eldest son Natshinnaung was made heir-apparent. He also give his eldest younger brother the title Thado Dhamma Yaza (သတိုးဓမ္မရာဇာ), the style of rulers of Prome, indicating that he had designs on Prome, the kingdom to his west.

=== Loss of Lower Burma ports ===
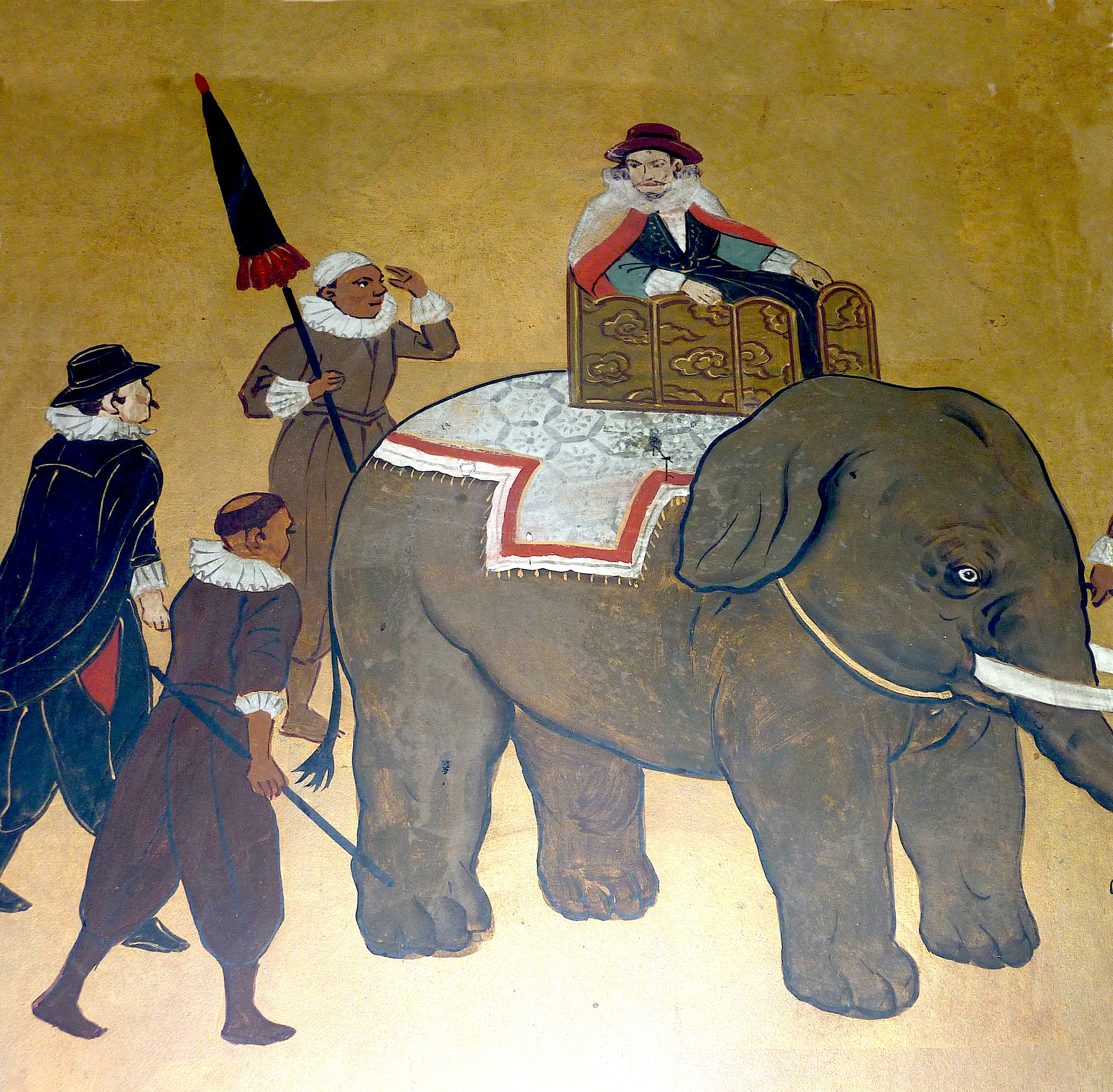
de Brito c. 1600s

His designs on Prome would have to wait. C. March/April 1603, (Note: (Than Tun 2011: 135): De Brito was appointed governor of Syriam by the viceroy of Goa, and left Goa in March 1603. He probably got back to Syriam in March or April 1603.) the Portuguese at Syriam declared their allegiance to the Portuguese Empire, and renounced ties to both Arakan and Toungoo.

In response, Toungoo and Arakan launched a joint attack on Syriam in the dry season of 1603–04. Minye Thihathu himself led the Toungoo army. But the Arakanese navy, consisted of a hundred ships and over a hundred war boats, was defeated by a few Portuguese warships near Cape Negrais, and their commander Crown Prince Min Khamaung was captured. The Arakanese king himself followed up with another 300-boat navy, and with the Toungoo forces jointly laid siege to the city. But Syriam defenses held. In the following negotiations, in 1604, the Arakanese agreed to a ransom of 50,000 ducats for the release of the crown prince, and to Syriam's status as a Portuguese colony.

=== Final years (1604–09) ===
In his last years, Minye Thihathu saw his kingdom increasingly squeezed by a resurgent Ava and a powerful Portuguese Syriam. The Portuguese takeover of Syriam (along with the Arakanese withdrawal) essentially ended Toungoo's hold over Lower Burma. In the following years, the Portuguese projected their power throughout the delta, and gained the allegiance of delta lords. Toungoo's borders were pushed back to Pegu, and the kingdom was now completely landlocked. The loss of maritime trade and revenue from the seaports adversely affected Toungoo's economy. In later years, even the Pegu border was routinely breached by the Portuguese. Chronicles state that Minye Thihathu's troops were powerless to stop the Portuguese looting the relic chambers of the Buddhist pagodas around Pegu.

Meanwhile in the north, King Anaukpetlun, following the work begun by his father King Nyaungyan, had reunified Upper Burma and cis-Salween Shan States by 1606, and captured Prome in 1608.

Toungoo was next. But Minye Thihathu did not live to see the showdown. He died on 11 August [O.S. 1 August] 1609 (Note: Chronicles (Maha Yazawin Vol. 3 2006: 108) and (Hmannan Vol. 3 2003: 114) say that he died on Tuesday, 15th waxing of Wagaung 971 ME, which translates to Saturday, 15 August 1609. But 15th waxing is a typographical error. First, it is uncommon to state "15th waxing" instead of "full moon". Secondly, the chronicles say that Natshinnaung's coronation ceremony was held on Friday, 6th waning of Wagaung 971 ME, which translates to Friday, 21 August 1609. It means the last possible Tuesday in the waxing part of the month the king could have died on was 11th waxing, which was Tuesday, 11 August 1609 NS. The Burmese numerals 1 (၁) and 5 (၅) are quite similar when written longhand.) in Toungoo. He was succeeded by Natshinnaung.

== Administration ==
After the Siamese invasion, he launched a major construction works program to rebuild the city of Toungoo and war ravaged areas around the city. He resettled people into his rebuilt city. The present-day quarters of Yodaya Dan ("Siamese Quarter"), Pabedan ("Blacksmith Quarter"), "Taik Tan" (formerly, Kye-Taik Tan, "Revenue Building Quarter") date from his time.

== List of military campaigns ==
Campaign	Duration	Troops commanded	Notes
Lan Na and Lan Xang	1564–65	12,000 men, 600 horses, 50 elephants	Led the Fifth Army, based out of northern Siam, and mainly consisted of Siamese troops. The Siamese regiments were led by their own lords including Maha Thammarachathirat of Phitsanulok (as well as governors of Sukhothai and Sawankhalok). Saw no action. Part of three armies that invaded Lan Xang. The armies took Vientiane in January 1565. They chased Lan Xang troops in the Laotian countryside for months but could not capture their leader King Setthathirat.
Siam	1568–69	5000 men, 500 horses, 50 elephants	Led the Fifth Army, consisted of regiments from Lan Na and Keng Tung.
Lan Xang	1569–70	5 regiments	Led the Fifth Army, now part of the Southern Army Group. Invaded Lan Xang via Phitsanulok. Recaptured Vientiane but still could not catch Setthathirat who remained active in the countryside.
Mohnyin and Mogaung	1575–76	9 regiments	Led an army (part of a 22,000-strong army group) to put down a rebellion the two Shan states
Arakan	1581	11,000	Led one of two armies that reinforced Toungoo troops in Arakan (Rakhine). Invaded via the Taungup Pass.
Siam	1586–87	2 regiments	Led two regiments from Toungoo.
Siam	1590–91	1 regiment	Sent one regiment led by his brother Prince of Kawliya
Siam	1592–93	1 regiment	Sent one regiments led by his eldest son Natshinnaung
Moulmein (Mawlamyaing)	1594–95	8,000	Led the 8000-strong army, charged with putting down a rebellion in Moulmein (Mawlamyaing). Toungoo supplied a single regiment, however. Driven back by Siamese troops.
Pegu	1598–99	5000	Led the Toungoo army in a joint operation with Mrauk-U (Arakan)
Siamese siege of Toungoo	1600	unspecified	Led the defense of the city.
Syriam	1603–04	5000 men, 300 horses, 30 elephants	Led the Toungoo army in a joint operation with Mrauk-U (Arakan)

== Bibliography ==
- Aung-Thwin, Michael A.; Maitrii Aung-Thwin (2012). A History of Myanmar Since Ancient Times (illustrated ed.). Honolulu: University of Hawai'i Press. ISBN 978-1-86189-901-9.
- Damrong Rajanubhab (1928). Chris Baker (ed.). Our Wars with the Burmese: Thai–Burmese Conflict 1539–1767. Translated by Aung Thein (2001 ed.). Bangkok: White Lotus. ISBN 974-7534-58-4.
- Harvey, G. E. (1925). History of Burma: From the Earliest Times to 10 March 1824. London: Frank Cass & Co. Ltd.
- Htin Aung, Maung (1967). A History of Burma. New York and London: Cambridge University Press.
- Kala, U (1724). Maha Yazawin (in Burmese). Vol. 1–3 (2006, 4th printing ed.). Yangon: Ya-Pyei Publishing.
- Lieberman, Victor B. (2003). Strange Parallels: Southeast Asia in Global Context, c. 800–1830, volume 1, Integration on the Mainland. Cambridge University Press. ISBN 978-0-521-80496-7.
- Phayre, Lt. Gen. Sir Arthur P. (1883). History of Burma (1967 ed.). London: Susil Gupta.
- Royal Historians of Burma (c. 1680). U Hla Tin (Hla Thamein) (ed.). Zatadawbon Yazawin (1960 ed.). Historical Research Directorate of the Union of Burma.
- Royal Historical Commission of Burma (1832). Hmannan Yazawin (in Burmese). Vol. 1–3 (2003 ed.). Yangon: Ministry of Information, Myanmar.
- Sein Lwin Lay, Kahtika U (1968). Mintaya Shwe Hti and Bayinnaung: Ketumadi Taungoo Yazawin (in Burmese) (2006, 2nd printing ed.). Yangon: Yan Aung Sarpay.
- Sandamala Linkara, Ashin (1931). Rakhine Yazawinthit Kyan (in Burmese). Vol. 1–2 (1997–1999 ed.). Yangon: Tetlan Sarpay.
- Stuart-Fox, Martin (2008). Historical Dictionary of Laos. Scarecrow Press. ISBN 9780810864115.
- Than Tun (1983). The Royal Orders of Burma, A.D. 1598–1885. Vol. 1. Kyoto: Kyoto University.
- Than Tun (2011). "23. Nga Zinga and Thida". Myanmar History Briefs (in Burmese). Yangon: Gangaw Myaing.

Minye Thihathu II of Toungoo Toungoo dynasty Born: c. 6 August 1550 Died: 11 August 1609
Regnal titles
Preceded by Tabinshwehti	King of Toungoo c. February 1597 – 11 August 1609	Succeeded by Natshinnaung
Royal titles
Preceded by Minkhaung II	Viceroy of Toungoo; June 1584 – c. February 1597	Succeeded by Natshinnaung
Preceded by	Governor of Tharrawaddy in or before October 1564 – 27 February 1574	Succeeded by Nawrahta Minsaw
