= Chit Mi of Prome =

Chit Mi ချစ်မိ

Queen of the Northern Palace of Prome
- Tenure: 1527 – 1532
- Predecessor: unknown
- Successor: unknown
- Born: c. 1490s Prome (Pyay); Prome Kingdom
- Died: 1540s?
- Spouse: Bayin Htwe
- Issue: Minkhaung of Prome; Minkhaung Medaw; Laygyun Mibaya unnamed son
- House: Prome
- Father: Minye Kyawswa II of Kale
- Mother: Min Hpone Htut of Prome
- Religion: Theravada Buddhism

Bodaw Chit Mi (Burmese: ဘိုးတော် ချစ်မိ, pronounced [bódɔ̀ tɕɪʔ mḭ]) was one of two principal queens of King Bayin Htwe of Prome. She was the mother of King Minkhaung of Prome, and a great-grandmother of Natshinnaung, the last king of the breakaway kingdom of Toungoo.

== Bibliography ==
- Kala, U (1724). Maha Yazawin (in Burmese). Vol. 1–3 (2006, 4th printing ed.). Yangon: Ya-Pyei Publishing.
- Royal Historical Commission of Burma (1832). Hmannan Yazawin (in Burmese). Vol. 1–3 (2003 ed.). Yangon: Ministry of Information, Myanmar.

Chit Mi of Prome Prome Kingdom
Royal titles
Unknown	Queen of the Northern Palace of Prome; 1527–1532	Unknown
