= Yaza Dewi (Binnya Ran I) =

Yaza Dewi ရာဇဒေဝီ

Chief Queen Consort of Hanthawaddy
- Tenure: c. 1424 – 1446?
- Predecessor: unknown
- Successor: Ye Mibaya
- Spouse: Binnya Ran I
- House: Hanthawaddy Pegu
- Religion: Theravada Buddhism

Yaza Dewi (Burmese: ရာဇဒေဝီ, Burmese pronunciation: [jàza̰ dèwì]; also known as Na Yaza Dewi (နာရာဇဒေဝီ, [nà jàza̰ dèwì])) was a principal queen of King Binnya Ran I of Hanthawaddy. She was most likely the king's chief queen consort since the 1485/86 Shwedagon Pagada inscriptions by King Dhammazedi list King Binnya Ran I and Queen Na Yaza Dewi as the royal donors in 798 ME (1436/37). (Note: (Pan Hla 2005: 368, footnote 1): The reverse side of the Mon-language inscription lists the prior kings and queens who donated at the pagoda including King Rama Rajadhiraj (Binnya Ran I) and his queen Na Rajadevi (နာရာဇဒေဝီ; Na Yaza Dewi). The name နာ "Na" is not a familiar Burmese name or title. It may be a Mon-language name, and/or most probably part of a longer title whose earlier parts are no longer visible. The legibility of Dhammazedi's Shwedagon inscriptions, at least seen in the Burmese language version of the inscription, is poor. The Burmese version of the inscription, as seen in (SMK Vol. 5 1998: 78–81 for the obverse; 82–85 for the reverse), contains several lines and words that are no longer legible. Indeed, the Burmese version no longer contains the list of donors to the Pagoda. Furthermore, this Na Yaza Dewi probably was not Queen Soe Min Wimala Dewi whose official title at Pegu, per (Hmannan Vol. 2 2003: 73), was Thiri Pawara Maha Dhamma Yaza Dewi. In any case, Queen Soe Min became a principal queen only in 1431. Binnya Ran who came to power in either 1424/25 or 1426/27 most likely had a chief queen prior to Queen Soe Min.)

== Bibliography ==
- Nyein Maung, ed. (1972–1998). Shay-haung Myanma Kyauksa-mya [Ancient Burmese Stone Inscriptions] (in Burmese). Vol. 1–5. Yangon: Archaeological Department.
- Pan Hla, Nai (1968). Razadarit Ayedawbon (in Burmese) (8th printing, 2005 ed.). Yangon: Armanthit Sarpay.
- Royal Historical Commission of Burma (1832). Hmannan Yazawin (in Burmese). Vol. 1–3 (2003 ed.). Yangon: Ministry of Information, Myanmar.

Yaza Dewi (Binnya Ran I) Hanthawaddy Dynasty
Royal titles
Unknown	Queen of Hanthawaddy c. 1424 – 1446?	Succeeded by Ye Mibaya
