= Thinkhaya of Pagan =

Thinkhaya သင်္ခယာ

Governor of Pagan
- Reign: by 1380/81 – 1413?
- Predecessor: Sithu
- Successor: Tarabya I of Pakhan
- Monarch: Swa Saw Ke (1380s?–1400); Tarabya (1400); Minkhaung I (1400–1413)
- Born: Thayet?
- Died: 1413? Pagan (Bagan)?
- Spouse: Saw Min Pu
- Issue: Saw Shwe Khet; Soe Min Wimala Dewi; Atula Thiri; Uzana; Thinkhaya
- Father: Min Shin Saw of Thayet
- Mother: ?

Thinkhaya (Burmese: သင်္ခယာ, pronounced [θɪ̀ɴkʰəjà]; also known as Uzana) was governor of Pagan (Bagan), a vassal state of Ava. According to the royal chronicles, he was governor of Pagan from at least since 1380/81 and at least until 1410 when he fought in the Forty Years' War against the southern Hanthawaddy kingdom. (Note: While chronicles' first explicit mention of him as Uzana of Pagan (Hmannan Vol. 1 2003: 414) was only in 1380/81 when he was considered by the Ava court to be the vassal king of Arakan. His last mention in the war was in the 1409–10 campaign when he commanded a regiment in 1st Army, per (Hmannan Vol. 1 2003: 476–477).)

A contemporary stone inscription states his title as Athinkhaya, lord of Pagan. The inscription also states that King Minkhaung I and Razadarit had just exchanged htis (royal white umbrellas), meaning they had agreed to a peace treaty, in 764 ME (1402/1403).

He was the father of Gov. Saw Shwe Khet of Prome, Queen Soe Min Wimala Dewi of Hanthawaddy, Queen Atula Thiri Maha Yaza Dewi of Ava, Cmdr. Uzana of the Southern Cavalry, and Gov. Thinkhaya of Sagu. He was also the maternal grandfather of King Leik Munhtaw of Hanthawaddy and King Thihathura of Ava.

Thinkhaya was succeeded by Tarabya as governor of Pagan in 1413. It is unclear if he had died or was replaced.

== Bibliography ==
- Maha Sithu (2012) [1798]. Kyaw Win; Thein Hlaing (eds.). Yazawin Thit (in Burmese). Vol. 1–3 (2nd ed.). Yangon: Ya-Pyei Publishing.
- Royal Historical Commission of Burma (2003) [1832]. Hmannan Yazawin (in Burmese). Vol. 1–3. Yangon: Ministry of Information, Myanmar.

Thinkhaya of Pagan Ava Kingdom
Royal titles
Preceded by Sithu	Governor of Pagan by 1380/81 – 1413	Succeeded by Tarabya I of Pakhan
