= Ye Mibaya =

Ye Mibaya ရာယ် မိဖုရား

Chief Queen Consort of Hanthawaddy
- Tenure: 1446 – 1451
- Predecessor: Yaza Dewi
- Successor: unknown
- Spouse: Binnya Waru
- House: Hanthawaddy Pegu
- Religion: Theravada Buddhism

Ye Mibaya (Mon: ရာယ်; Burmese: ရာယ် မိဖုရား, Burmese pronunciation: [jɛ̀ mḭbəjá] (Note: Transliteration based on the approximate modern Burmese pronunciation of the Mon name ရာယ်, whose Mon pronunciation most likely retains the "r" sound, and may be closer to Re (or Raw). (Pan Hla 2005: 368, footnote 1) does not provide a Burmese phonetic spelling of ရာယ် that can be used to transliterate the name into a foreign language by Burmese speakers.)) was a principal queen of King Binnya Waru of Hanthawaddy. She was most likely the king's chief queen consort since the 1485/86 Shwedagon Pagada inscriptions by King Dhammazedi list King Binnya Waru and Queen Ye as the royal donors at the pagoda. (Note: (Pan Hla 2005: 368, footnote 1): The reverse side of the Mon-language inscription lists the prior kings and queens who donated at the pagoda including King Binnya Waru and his queen Ye. The name ရာယ် "Ye/Re" is not a familiar Burmese name or title. It may be a Mon-language name, and/or most probably part of a longer title which is no longer completely visible. The legibility of Dhammazedi's Shwedagon inscriptions, at least seen in the Burmese language version of the inscription, is poor. The Burmese version of the inscription, as seen in (SMK Vol. 5 1998: 78–81 for the obverse; 82–85 for the reverse), contains several lines and words that are no longer legible. Indeed, the Burmese version no longer contains the list of donors to the Pagoda.)

== Bibliography ==
- Nyein Maung, ed. (1972–1998). Shay-haung Myanma Kyauksa-mya [Ancient Burmese Stone Inscriptions] (in Burmese). Vol. 1–5. Yangon: Archaeological Department.
- Pan Hla, Nai (1968). Razadarit Ayedawbon (in Burmese) (8th printing, 2005 ed.). Yangon: Armanthit Sarpay.

Ye Mibaya Hanthawaddy Dynasty
Royal titles
Preceded by Yaza Dewi	Chief Queen Consort of Hanthawaddy; 1446 – 1451	Unknown
