= Shin Sawbu =

Shin Sawbu ရှင်စောပု
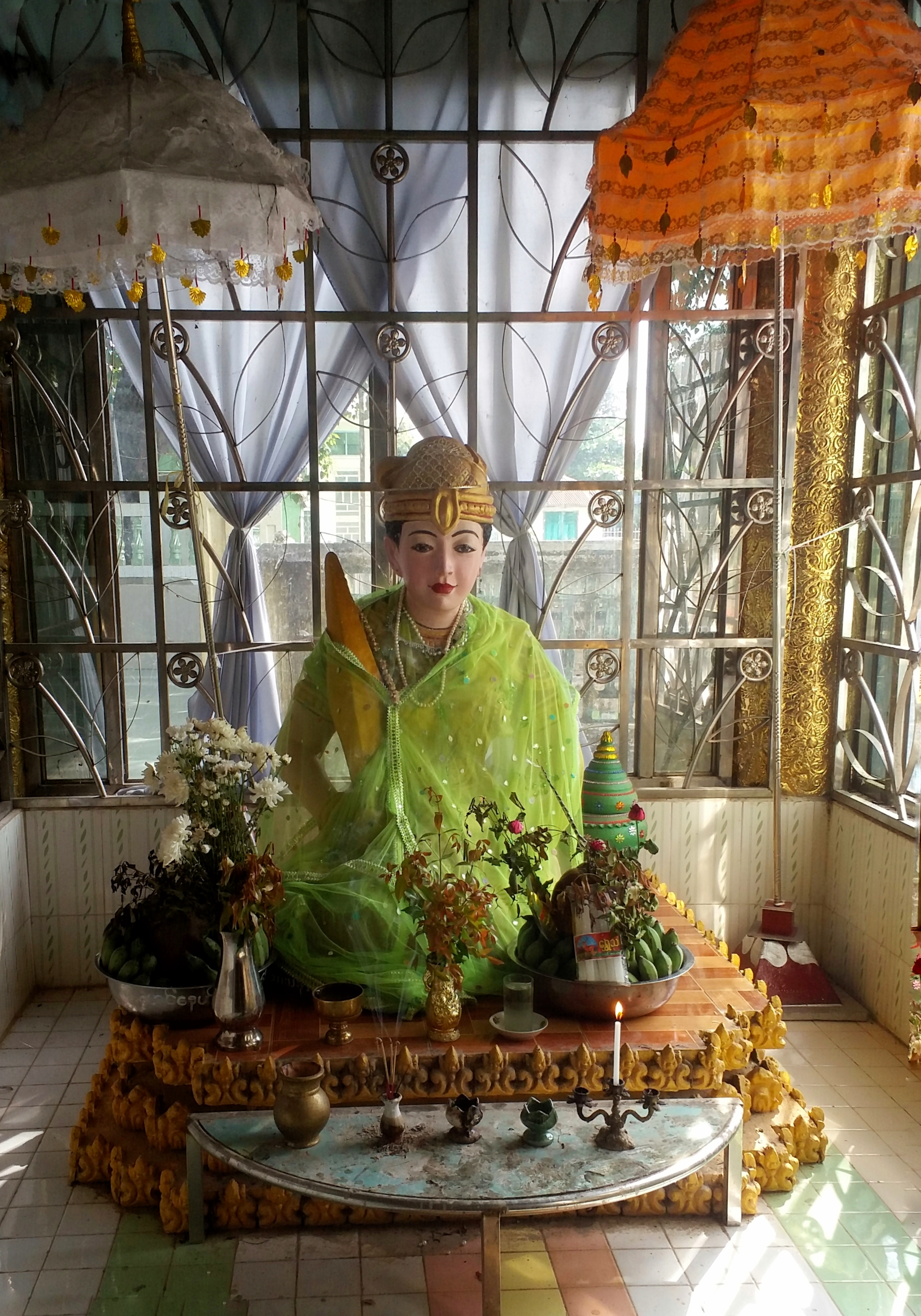
- Statue of Queen Shin Sawbu

Queen regnant of Hanthawaddy
- Reign: 1454 – 1471
- Predecessor: Leik Munhtaw
- Successor: Dhammazedi
- Regent: Dhammazedi (from 1460)

Queen Mother of Hanthawaddy
- Tenure: 1446 – 1451
- Monarch: Binnya Waru

Queen consort of the Central Palace of Ava
- Tenure: August 1426 – 1429
- Predecessor: herself
- Successor: Dhamma Dewi of Ava

Queen consort of the Central Palace of Ava
- Tenure: December 1423 – August 1425
- Predecessor: Min Pyan of Ava
- Successor: herself
- Born: 11 February 1394; Wednesday, 12th waxing of Tabaung 755 ME; Pegu (Bago); Hanthawaddy kingdom
- Died: 1471 (aged 77); Dagon; Hanthawaddy kingdom
- Burial: Sanchaung
- Consort: Binnya Bwe (c. 1413–1419); Thihathu (1423–1425); Tarabya Minye Kyawhtin (1425–1426); Mohnyin Thado (1426–1429)
- Issue: Binnya Waru; Mi Pakahtaw
Names
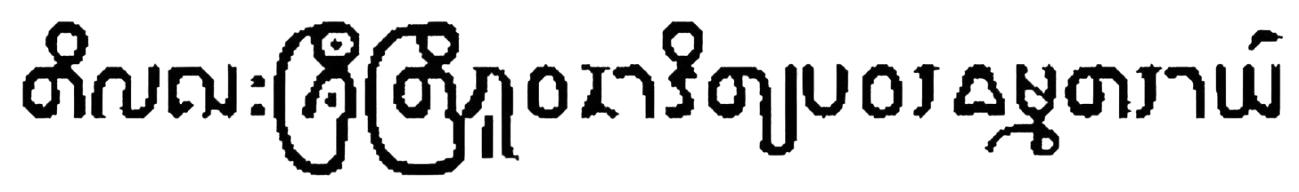
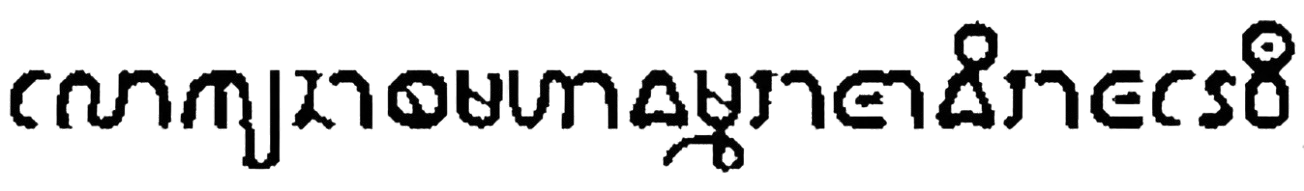
- Ti La Ñaḥ Śri Træ̆ Bhū Wa Nā Di Tya Pa Wa Ra Dham Ta Rāy Lo Kya Nā Tha Ma Hā Dham Rā Ja Da Wǐ
- House: Hanthawaddy
- Father: Razadarit
- Mother: Thuddhamaya
- Religion: Theravada Buddhism

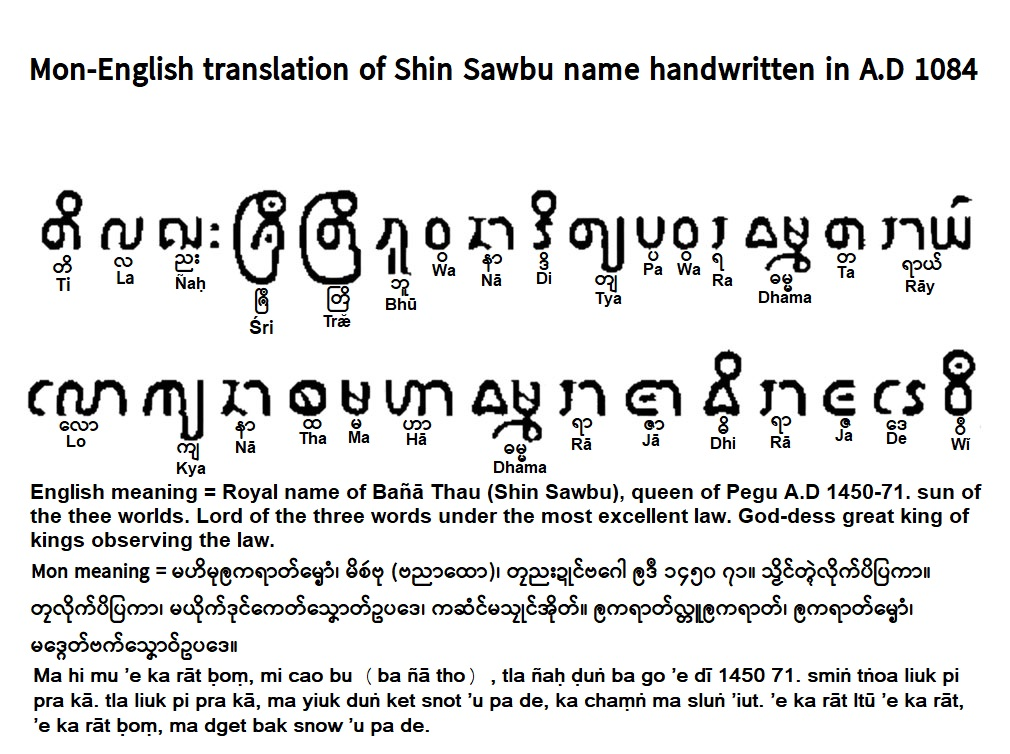
Name meaning Mon and English.

Shin Sawbu (Burmese: ရှင်စောပု, pronounced [ʃɪ̀ɰ̃ sɔ́ bṵ]; Mon: မိစဴဗု,; 1394–1471) was queen regnant of Hanthawaddy from 1454 to 1471. Queen Shin Sawbu is also known as Binnya Thau (Mon: ဗြဴဗညာထဝ်,) or Old Queen in Mon. Queen Shin Sawbu and Queen Jamadevi of Haripunjaya are the two most famous among the small number of queens who ruled in mainland Southeast Asia.

== Early life ==
Shin Sawbu was the only daughter of the Mon King Razadarit who had two sons as well. She was born on 11 February 1394 (Wednesday, 12th waxing of Tabaung of 755 ME) to the junior queen Thuddhamaya (သုဒ္ဓမာယာ). At birth she was given the name Vihāradevī (lit. 'queen of the monastery' in Sanskrit and Pali). At age 20, she was married to Binnya Bwe (Smin Chesao), Razadarit's nephew and had a son, Binnya Waru and two daughters, Netaka Taw and Netaka Thin. Her husband died when she was just 25.

== Residence at Ava ==
In 1421, Sawbu's father King Razadarit died. The king's eldest son Binnya Dhammaraza ascended the throne but his younger brothers Binnya Ran and Binnya Kyan rebelled. By the invitation of Binnya Kyan, King Thihathu of Ava came down with an army in November 1423 (Natdaw 785 ME). (Note: Burmese chronicles do not agree on the invasion date. Maha Yazawin (Kala Vol. 2 2006: 58) says the invasion began in Natdaw 785 ME (4 Nov 1423 to 2 December 1423) but Hmannan Yazawin (RHC Vol. 2 2003: 56) says it began a year earlier in Natdaw 784 ME (19 Oct 1422 to 16 November 1422). However the editors of the 2006 edition of Maha Yazawin side with the November 1423 date.) Binnya Dhammaraza pacified his brothers by making Binnya Ran the crown prince as well as giving the governorship of the Irrawaddy delta, and Binnya Kyan the governorship of Martaban. Crown Prince Binnya Ran in a gesture of peace, presented his sister Shin Sawbu to Thihathu, who, in turn presented a princess of Ava to marry Binnya Ran. It was December 1423. (Note: Maha Yazawin (Kala Vol. 2 2006: 56) says Binnya Ran made the offer one month into the invasion. It means Pyatho 785 ME (2 December 1423 to 31 December 1423).)

When Shin Sawbu went to Ava, she was 29 years old, a widow and a mother with a son and two daughters. During the time she resided at Ava, she did not have any additional children. King Thihathu was very fond of her but he died during a military expedition in the north in 1425. Shin Sawbu remained in Ava for four more years. During her residence at Ava, Shin Sawbu became the patron of two Mon monks, Dhammanyana and Pitakahara, who resided at the Ariyadhaza monastery at Sagaing near Ava. In 1429, at the age of 35, the queen escaped with the help of her Mon monk preceptors and returned to Pegu accompanied by them.

== Reign at Pegu ==
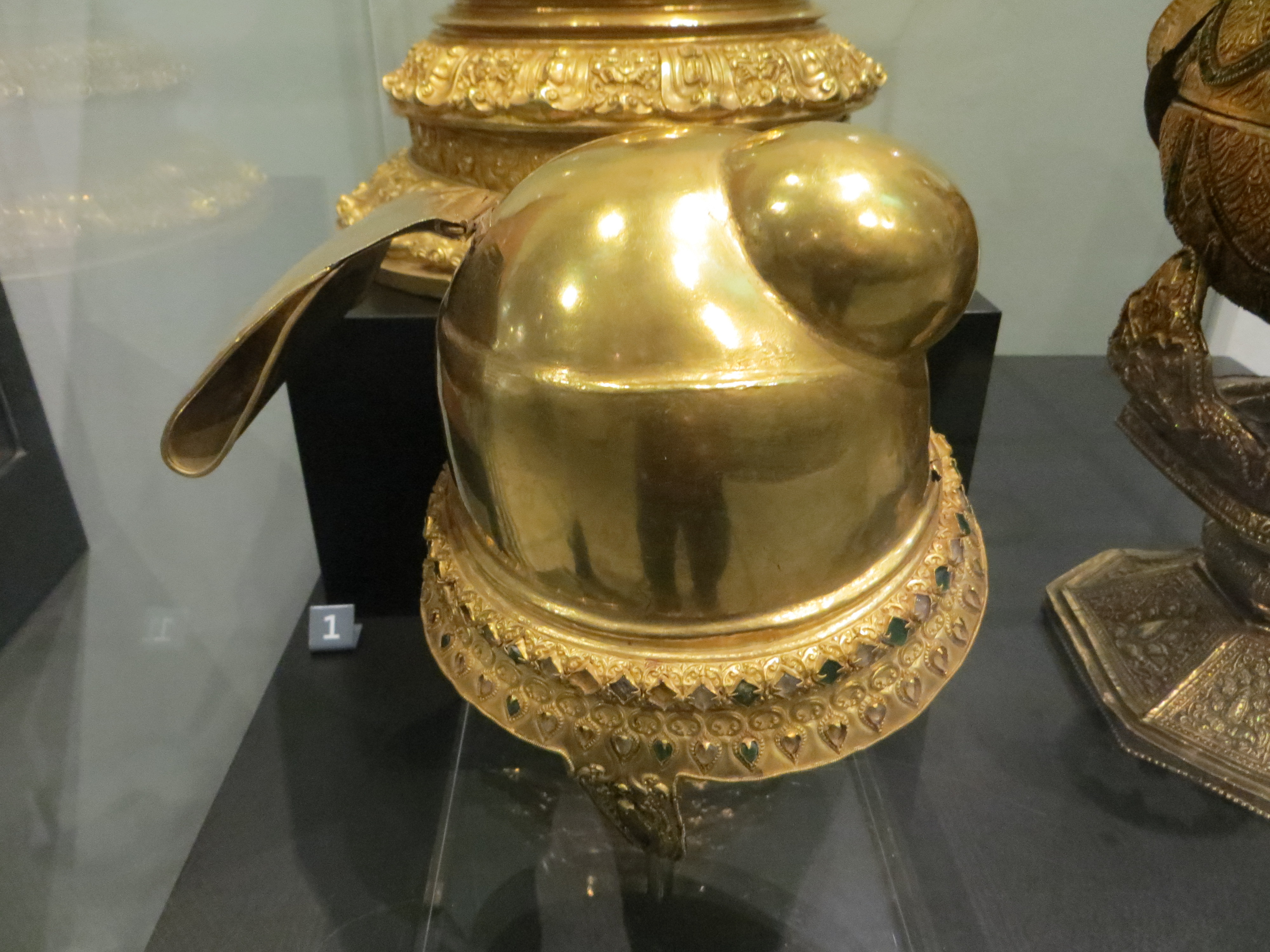
Ceremonial helmet worn by Shin Sawbu, now at the V&A Museum, London

All members of Pegu's male line to the throne having been exhausted, Shin Sawbu ascended the throne as queen in early 1454. Two of her brothers, Binnya Dhammayaza and Banya Ran I, and one of her sons, Binnya Waru, had already ruled as kings of Pegu.

In 1457, shortly after ascending the throne, the Buddhist world celebrated the two thousandth anniversary of the Buddha's Paranirvana which in Southeast Asia is dated to the year 543 BCE.

After ruling Pegu for around seven years, in 1460 she decided to abdicate and move from Pegu to Dagon where she could lead a life of religious devotion next to the Shwedagon pagoda.

Shin Sawbu chose a monk to succeed her on the throne of Pegu. The monk Pitakahara, who had helped her escape from Ava, left the sangha, was given the titles Punnaraja and Dhammazedi, and became her son-in-law and a suitable heir to the throne by marrying her younger daughter Mipakathin.

== Reign at Dagon ==
Shin Sawbu lived in Dagon next to the Shwedagon Pagoda until the end of her life in 1471. Even after she moved to Dagon she is said to have still worn a crown.

The actual handing over of power from Shin Sawbu to Dhammazedi, who became king under the title Ramadhipati in the year 1457, is commemorated in an inscription written in the Mon language.

In Dagon, the queen devoted her time and attention to the Shwedagon pagoda, enlarging the platform around the pagoda, paving it with stones and placing stone posts and lamps around the outside of the pagoda. She extended the glebe lands supporting the pagoda to Danok. Almost everything that Shin Sawbu did, she did in multiples of four:

"There were four white umbrellas, four golden alms-bowls, four earthenware vessels, and four offerings were made each day. Twenty-seven men prepared the lamps each day. There were twenty men as guardians of the pagoda treasury. There were four goldsmith's shops, four orchestras, four drums, four sheds, eight doorkeepers, four sweepers, and twenty lamp lighters. She built round and strengthened the sevenfold wall. Between the walls, Her Majesty Banya Thau had them plant palmyra and coconut trees."

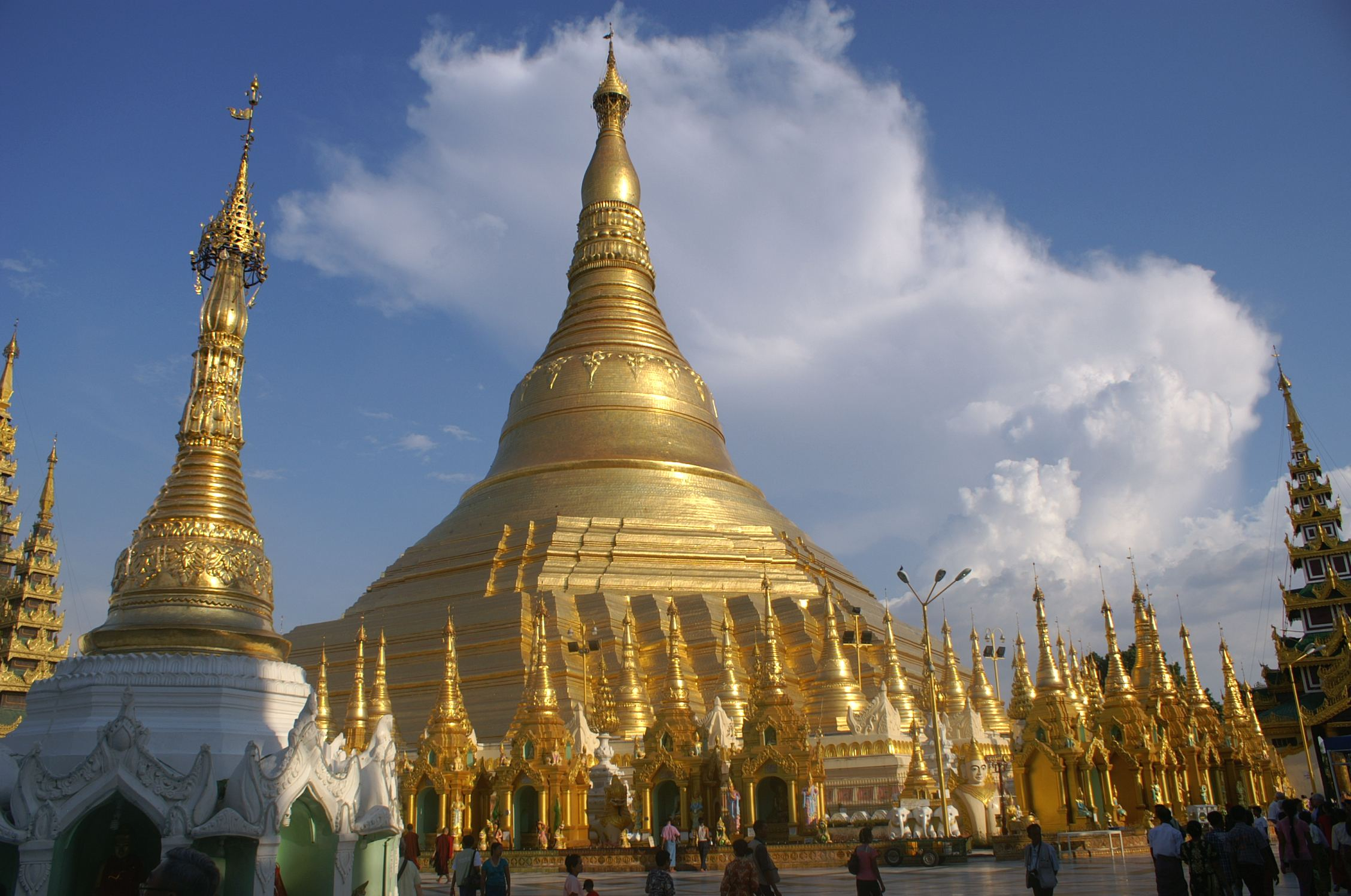
Shwedagon pagoda in Dagon (now Yangon)

She also had her own weight in gold (25 viss) beaten out into gold leaf and covered the Shwedagon pagoda with this gold leaf. The inhabitants of Dagon donated 5,000 viss of bronze to the pagoda.

== Stone inscriptions ==
Three inscriptions in stone have been found from Shin Sawbu's reign.

The first inscription, known as Kyaikmaraw I commemorates a land dedication. On 25 September 1455, the queen dedicated land to the Kyaikmaraw pagoda that she had built. The inscription records that jewels, precious objects, and the revenues of a place named "Tko' Mbon" were given to the Moh Smin [Royal Promontory] pagoda at Myatheindan near Martaban. The second part of the inscription provides benedictions for those coming to pay their respects to the pagoda and makes many references to Buddhist scripture. The third part of the inscription outlines the torments of hell. The inscription is rich in linguistic, religious, and historical information with Burmese linguistic influences and the word "caw" or "chao" meaning "lord" from a Tai language used supposedly because "this title had been given to the Wareru dynasty by the Thai king."

== Mon folk traditions ==
At the end of the nineteenth century, some Mons are said to have regarded the British Queen Victoria as the reincarnation of Shin Sawbu.

The story of how the queen chose a successor runs as follows. After ruling for only seven years, she decided to abdicate. She devised a method to choose which one of the two monks who had accompanied her during her residence in Ava should succeed her as ruler:

"One morning when they came to receive the royal rice, she secreted in one of their bowls a pahso (layman's dress) [male sarong, skirt-like dress] together with little models of the five regalia; then, having prayed that the lot might fall on the worthier, she returned the bowls. Dhammazedi. To whom the fateful bowl fell, left the sacred order, received her daughter in marriage, and assumed the government. The other monk, in his disappointment, aroused suspicion and was executed in Paunglin, north of Dagon. The lords also resented the choice at first but became reconciled owing to Dhammazedi's high character; when some of them continued murmuring that he was not of royal race, Shinsawbu had a beam taken out of the and carved into a Buddha image, and showed it to them saying 'Ye say he is of common blood, he cannot be your King. See here this common wood – yesterday it was trodden in the dust of your feet, but to-day, is it not the Lord and do we not bow before it?'."

Singer provides an alternative story with the governor of Pathein, Binnya Ein, married to Shin Sawbu's elder daughter Mipakahtau, rebelling because he was not appointed king ahead of Dhammazedi. This rebellion ends when he is poisoned.

Baña Thau means "Old Queen" in the Mon language. Harvey relates the story of how this name originated taken from the "Thatonhnwemun Yazawin" chronicle:

"Once while being carried around the city in her gorgeous palanquin, sword in hand and crown on head, she heard an old man exclaim, as her retinue pushed him aside, "I must get out of the way, must I? I am an old fool, am I? I am not so old that I could not get a child, which is more than your old queen could do!" Thunderstruck at such irreverence, she meekly accepted it as a sign from heaven, and thereafter styled herself 'The Old Queen'."

The Mon history Nidana Ramadhipati Katha provides an alternative story of how Baña Thau ended up living in Ava claiming that she was already ruling at Pegu as queen when she was abducted and brought to Ava and made chief queen.

== Dispute over duration of reign ==
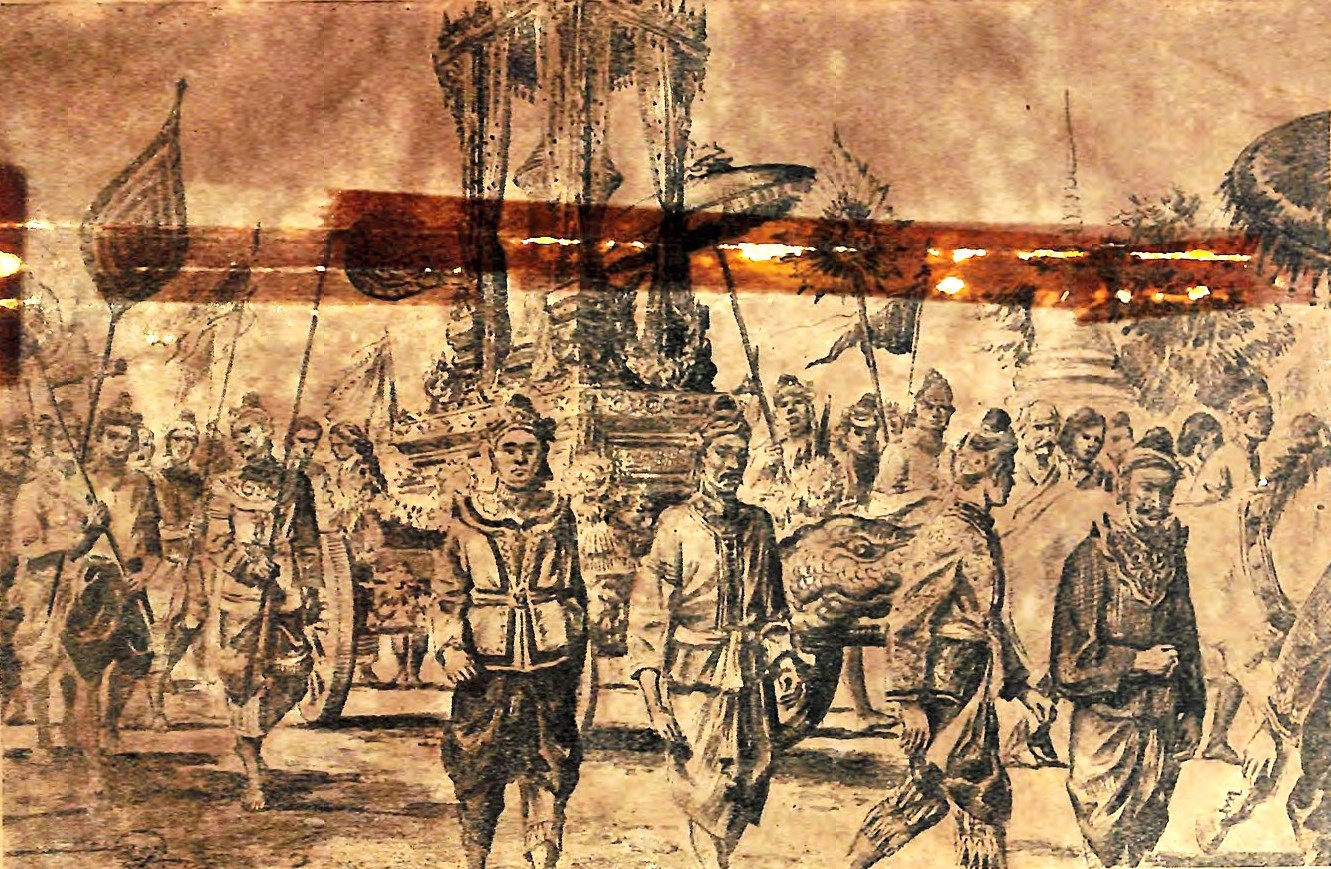
Funeral procession of Queen Shin Sawbu. An illustration from Rachathirat, a Thai version of Razadarit Ayedawbon, 1946 printed edition. Noted that the artist depicted this funeral in Thai royal tradition.

Some hold that Shin Sawbu ruled for seven years, others seventeen years. Shorto first hypothesized that she might have ruled jointly with Dhammazedi. Guillon holds that Sawbu and Dhammazedi ruled jointly, with Dhammazedi ruling over Pegu and Shinsawbu ruling over Dagon. Dagon had long been the traditional appanage of Mon queens.

== Palace and burial locations ==
Furnival claimed that "the ramparts of Shin Sawbu's residence at Dagon" were the colonial era "bunkers of the golf course near the Prome Road," but others claim these ruins are, in fact, a wall built in 1841.

The stupa that contained her remains is said to be at a monastery in Sanchaung Township of modern-day Yangon near the Shwedagon Pagoda on the grounds of a monastery once named the Shin Sawbu Tomb Monastery, which is located west of Pyay Road (Prome Road) on Shin Saw Pu Road (Windsor Road).

== Historiography ==
Various Burmese chronicles do not agree on the key dates of the queen's life.

| Event | Slapat Rajawan (1766) | Mon Yazawin (Shwe Naw) | Maha Yazawin (1724) | Hmannan Yazawin (1832) |
|---|---|---|---|---|
| Birth | c. 1406 (Note: (Schmidt 1906: 135): She died in 832 ME (1470/71) in her 65th year (at age 64), implying that she was born c. 1406.) | Nov/Dec 1395 (Note: (Shwe Naw 1922: 69): She was born on a Wednesday in 757 ME in the season of Byeissa (ဗြိစ္ဆာ), which corresponds to Scorpio. It means she was born around November/December 1395.) | 19 February 1396 (Note: Wednesday, 12th waxing of Tabaung 757 ME, which translates to Saturday, 19 February 1396.) | 11 February 1394 (Note: Wednesday, 12th waxing of Tabaung 755 ME, which translates to Wednesday, 11 February 1394.) |
| Marriage to Smin Sithu | | not reported | 1410/11 (Note: 772 ME (1410/11) when she was in her 15th year (aged 14).) | 1413/14 (Note: 775 ME (1413/14) when she was in her 20th year (aged 19).) |
| Birth of son Binnya Waru and death of Smin Sithu | | not reported | 1420/21 (Note: 782 ME (1420/21)) | 1418/19 (Note: 780 ME (1418/19) when she was in her 25th year (aged 24).) |
| Ava years | | 1422–1427 | c. early 1424 – 1434/35 (Note: The Maha Yazawin is inconsistent.: In one section, she was wedded to King Thihathu of Ava c. December 1423 or January 1424.; In another section, she married King Thihathu in 786 ME (1424/25), when she was in her 29th year (aged 28).) | c. January 1423 – c. November 1429 (Note: She married King Thihathu of Ava c. late January 1423. She spent six years and ten months in Ava before fleeing to Pegu; she was in her 36th year (aged 35) at the time.) |
| Reign | 1463/64–1470/71 | 1445/46–1470/71 | 1448/49–1470/71; 1453/54–1470/71 (summary section) | 1452/53–1470/71; 1453/54–1470/71 (summary section) |
| Death | 1470/71 | 1470/71 | 1470/71 | 1470/71 |
| Age at death | 64 | 75 | 75 | 77 |

== Commemorations ==
- Shin Saw Pu Road, a road in Yangon

== Bibliography ==
- Forchammer Notes on the Early History and Geography of British Burma – I. The Shwedagon Pagoda, II. The First Buddhist Mission to Suvannabhumi, publ. Superintendent Government Printing, Rangoon 1884.
- Fraser (1920) "Old Rangoon" Journal of the Burma Research Society, volume X, Part I, pp. 49–60.
- Furnivall, Syriam Gazetteer.
- Guillon, Emmanuel (tr. ed. James V. Di Crocco) (1999) The Mons: A civilization of Southeast Asia, Bangkok: The Siam Society.
- Halliday, Robert (2000) (Christian Bauer ed.) The Mons of Burma and Thailand, Volume 2. Selected Articles, Bangkok: White Lotus.
- Harvey, G.E. (1925) History of Burma: From the earliest times to 10 March 1824 the beginning of the English conquest, New York: Longmans, Green, and Co.
- Sayadaw Athwa [The Monk of Athwa], Burmese translation of his Talaing History of Pegu used by Phayre, now in the British Museum, being manuscripts OR 3462–4.
- Saya Thein (1910) "Shin Sawbu," Journal of the Burma Research Society

[Summarizing the "Thaton-hnwe-mun Yazawin" below, but also giving the slightly different chronology of the Burmese chronicle "Hmannan Yazawin"]

- Saya Thein (1912) "Rangoon in 1852" Journal of the Burma Research Society.
- Schmidt, P.W. (1906) Slapat ragawan datow smim ron. Buch des Ragawan, der Konigsgeschichte, publ. for Kais. Akademie der Wissenschaften by Holder, Vienna, pp. 133–135
- Shorto, Harry Leonard (1958) "The Kyaikmaraw inscriptions," Bulletin of the School of Oriental and African Studies (BSOAS), 21(2): 361–367.
- Shorto (1971) A dictionary of Mon inscriptions from the sixth to the sixteenth centuries. London: Oxford University Press.
- Shorto (tr.) (no date) Unpublished typescript translation of pp. 34–44, 61–264 of Phra Candakanto (ed.) Nidana Ramadhipati-katha (or as on binding Rajawamsa Dhammaceti Mahapitakadhara), authorship attributed to Bannyadala (c. 1518–1572), Pak Lat, Siam, 1912.
- Singer, Noel F. (1992) "The Golden Relics of Bana Thau," Arts of Asia, September–October 1992. [Contains many interesting and original historical interpretations]
- Thaton-hnwe-mun Yazawin, unpublished manuscript cited in Harvey, p. 117, the facts about Baña Thau in this chronicle are summarised in (Hmawbi Saya Thein, 1910)
- Athwa, Sayadaw (1766). "Slapat des Ragawan der Königsgeschichte". Die äthiopischen Handschriften der K.K. Hofbibliothek zu Wien (in German). 151. Translated by P.W. Schmidt (1906 ed.). Vienna: Alfred Hölder.
- Shwe Naw, ed. (1785). Mon Yazawin (Shwe Naw) (in Burmese). Translated by Shwe Naw (1922 ed.). Yangon: Burma Publishing Workers Association Press.

Shin Sawbu Hanthawaddy Dynasty Born: 11 February 1394 Died: 1471
Regnal titles
| Preceded by Leik Munhtaw | Queen regnant of Hanthawaddy; 1454–1471 | Succeeded by Dhammazedi |
Royal titles
| Preceded by Min Pyan of Ava | Queen of the Central Palace of Ava; 1423–1425 | Succeeded by herself |
| Preceded by herself | Queen of the Central Palace of Ava; 1426–1429 | Succeeded by Dhamma Dewi of Ava |
