= Slapat Rajawan =

- Author: Sayadaw Athwa
- Original title: သုပတ် ရာဇာဝင် ဒတောဝ် သ္ငီ ရောင်
- Translator: P.W. Schmidt (to German); R. Halliday (to English)
- Language: Mon
- Series: Burmese chronicles
- Genre: Chronicle, History
- Publication date: 14 December 1766 (Note: (Schmidt 1906: III-6) states in German "im Jahre 1128 1766 der christlichen Zeitrechnung am 12 Tage der zunehmenden Hälfte des Monats Miggasiro an einem Sonntag." The author completed the manuscript on Sunday, 12th waxing of Nadaw 1128 ME (Saturday, 13 December 1766). The date is more probably Sunday, 13th waxing of Nadaw 1128 ME (14 December 1766). (Schmidt 1906: III-6–7) further states that the manuscript Schmidt used for his translation was a copy of the original, and the copying was completed on Friday, 4th waxing of Nayon, 1207 ME (9 May 1845) -- in German "1207 am 4 Tage der zunehmenden Hälfte des Monats Ġeh an einem Freitag.")
- Publication place: Kingdom of Burma
- English publication date: 1923
- Media type: print

Slapat Rajawan Datow Smin Ron (Mon: သုပတ် ရာဇာဝင် ဒတောဝ် သ္ငီ ရောင်; lit. 'History of Kings'), more commonly known as Bago Yazawin, is a Mon language chronicle that covers 17 dynasties from the legendary times to the Hanthawaddy period. Written by an ethnic Mon monk, the chronicle was a religion/legend-centric chronicle although it does cover secular history from Sri Ksetra and Pagan to Hanthawaddy periods. As the Hmannan Yazawin chronicle would follow later, Slatpat linked its kings to the Buddha and Buddhist mythology. It was translated into German by P.W. Schmidt in 1906, and into English by R. Halliday in the Journal of the Burma Research Society in 1923. Schmidt's 1906 publication contains a reprint of a Mon language manuscript of the chronicle.

== Versions ==
Though the chronicle was written in 1766, it apparently has at least two versions (Note: The versions used by (Phayre 1873) and (Schmidt 1906)) with uncertain provenance. The provenance of the version used by Schmidt and Halliday traces not to Lower Burma but to Siam. (Note: (Schmidt 1906: III-6) and (Aung-Thwin 2005: 98): The manuscript used by Schmidt was first sent to C.O. Blagden in 1892 by H.L. Eales, an official engaged in the census of Burma of 1891. Eales, in turn, had obtained it from Maung Dut, an ethnic Mon revenue officer in the colonial administration. Dut had acquired it from a Maung Deik of Saingdi, a village near Pegu. Deik said he had gotten it from his great-grandfather, one Bala Theiddi, who had brought it back to Burma after a campaign against Siam during Bodawpaya's reign. The original manuscript from Siam was then said to have been given to a monk of Kokainggyi but the son of Bala Theiddi was said to have a copy of it prior to the donation. The manuscript Blagden got from Eales was that son's copy, the original having been lost. In all, the manuscript's origin can be traced back only to Siam although it presumably was written by Sayadaw Athwa of Pegu.) The version used by Phayre was based on the Burmese translation by Shwe Kya, of a manuscript by Sayadaw Athwa. Phayre stated that "the chronology of the narrative is very confused", and that "neither the author nor the translator, however, has attempted to correct the manifest errors which exist."

=== Foundation of Pegu ===
Both versions state that Pegu (Bago) was founded in 1116 Buddhist Era (572/573 CE). (Note: See (Phayre 1873: 32) and (Schmidt 1906: 20, 101).) Schmidt's manuscript states that the town was founded on the 1st waxing of the month of Mak of 1116 BE (c. 19 January 573 CE). (Note: (Schmidt 1906: 101): In German: "Als der erhabene Buddha das Parinibbān während tausend hundert 16 Jahre inne hatte im Jahre der Stadt, nach Festsetzung, 514, im Monat Māk, am 1. der Monatshälfte, am 2. Tage, errichtete König In die zum ersten Anfang.") It also states that the year 1116 BE is equivalent to the year 514 of the "third era of the city", which Schmidt could not decipher. However, according to Phayre, one of the "native records" says that Pegu was founded in 514 Myanmar Era (1152/1153 CE). If so, the Slapat's 1st waxing of Tabodwe 514 would be 27 December 1152, equivalent to 1st waxing of Tabodwe 1696 BE (not 1116 BE).

=== Reign dates ===
Though both were written by one Sayadaw Athwa, several differences exist between the Schmidt's 1906 translation and Phayre's 1873 History of Pegu which may contain Phayre's corrections.

Monarch	Reign per Schmidt's manuscript (1906)	Reign per Phayre (1873)	Notes
Binnya U	710–745 ME (1348/49–1383/84 CE)	710–747 ME (1348/49–1385/86 CE)	
Razadarit	745–783 (1383/84–1421/22)	747–785 (1385/86–1423/24)	Called Siharaga in Schmidt's version
Binnya Dhammaraza	783–786 (1421/22–1424/25)	785–788 (1423/24–1426/27)	
Binnya Ran I	786–818 (1424/25–1456/57)	788–808 (1426/27–1446/47)	
Binnya Waru	818–821 (1456/57–1459/60)	808–812 (1446/47–1450/51)	
Binnya Kyan	821–825 (1459/60–1463/64)	812–815 (1450/51–1453/54)	
Leik Munhtaw	825–825 (1463/64–1463/64)	815–815 (1453/54–1453/54)	
Shin Sawbu	825–832 (1463/64–1470/71)	815–822 (1453/54–1460/61)	
Dhammazedi	832–853 (1470/71–1491/92)	822–853 (1460/61–1491/92)	
Binnya Ran II	853–888 (1491/92–1526/27)	853–888 (1491/92–1526/27)	
Takayutpi	888–900 (1526/27–1538/39)	888–900 (1526/27–1538/39)	

== Bibliography ==
- Aung-Thwin, Michael A. (2005). The Mists of Rāmañña: The Legend that was Lower Burma (illustrated ed.). Honolulu: University of Hawai'i Press. ISBN 9780824828868.
- Phayre, Major-General Sir Arthur P. (1873). "The History of Pegu". Journal of the Asiatic Society of Bengal. 42. Calcutta: 23–57, 120–159.
- Schmidt, P.W. (1906). "Slapat des Ragawan der Königsgeschichte". Die äthiopischen Handschriften der K.K. Hofbibliothek zu Wien (in German). 151. Vienna: Alfred Hölder.
