= Mon Yazawin (Shwe Naw) =

Chronicle about the Hanthawaddy Kingdom as well as of earlier Mon polities

- Original title: မွန်ရာဇဝင်
- Translator: Shwe Naw
- Language: Burmese
- Series: Burmese chronicles
- Genre: Chronicle, History
- Publication date: 30 January 1785 (original manuscript); 1922 (machine published)
- Pages: 111

Mon Yazawin (Burmese: မွန်ရာဇဝင်, pronounced [mʊ̀ɴ jàzəwɪ̀ɴ]; also spelled Mun Yazawin), translated from Mon into Burmese by Shwe Naw, is a chronicle about the Hanthawaddy kingdom as well as of earlier Mon polities. It is one of the two extant chronicles named "Mon Yazawin" (or "Mun Yazawin").

== Provenance ==
There are two known extant chronicles with the Burmese language name of မွန်ရာဇဝင် (Mon Yazawin). The subject of this article was first machine published in 1922.

According to J.A. Stewart, the source of the 1922 publication, whose title he transliterated as Mun Yazawin, was a 19th-century compilation (and translation into Burmese) of older Mon language manuscripts by one U Shwe Naw. (Note: (Aung-Thwin 2017: 221–222, 337): citing (Stewart in Journal of the Burma Research Society, Vol. 13, No. 2, 1923: 69–76)) Stewart continued that the reference Mon manuscripts were actually those collected by Sir Arthur Purves Phayre from Siam; and that Shwe Naw's Burmese language manuscript was found at the Mingun Pitaka Taik (Mingun Library) at Sagaing. According to Michael Aung-Thwin who followed up on Stewart's statement, the only Mon language history manuscript found in the Sir Arthur Phayre Collection in the British Library is a palm-leaf manuscript, cataloged as History of the Talaings. (Note: (Aung-Thwin 2017: 222): The Mon language palm-leaf manuscript for History of the Talaings is cataloged as OR 3414 in the British Library. Note that Aung-Thwin, who does not read Mon, does not state that the text is indeed the work (or one of the works) Shwe Naw used to compile the Mon Yazawin chronicle.) Furthermore, the epilogue section of the 1922 publication states that the manuscript—presumably the Mon language manuscript Phayre collected—was completed on the 6th waning of Tabodwe 1146 ME (30 January 1785).

== Subject matter ==
The chronicle mainly covers the history of Martaban–Pegu monarchs from Wareru to Takayutpi. It also contains brief early histories of the Thuwunnabhumi and Hanthawaddy kingdoms. The chronicle's chronology is highly unreliable. Not only are many of its dates wildly divergent from other chronicles' dates for the same events, but the dates in different sections of the chronicle do not agree with one another. (Note: See (Mon Yazawin 1922). Shwe Naw did not check the dates with those of other chronicles. For example, (Mon Yazawin 1922: 39) says King Wareru seized the governorship of Martaban on the 6th waxing of Tabodwe 1064 ME (6 January 1703) whereas all other chronicles say 643 ME (1281/82) or 646 ME (1284/85). Nor is it consistent with its own dates. Although it says Wareru seized the governorship in 1064 ME (1702/03), (Mon Yazawin 1922: 44–45) reports 83 years and 7 monarchs later, the eighth king Binnya U ascended the throne in 1060 ME (1698/99).)

The following table is a summary of the monarchs of the Wareru dynasty as reported in the chronicle.

Monarch	Age at accession	Reign duration	Age at death	Relationship with predecessor	Notes
Wareru	24 (in 1064 ME)	37	61	founder	(Note: (Mon Yazawin 1922: 44): King Wareru became king in his 25th year (at age 24), reigned for 37 years and died in his 62nd year (age 61). This is different from the reporting by the Razadarit Ayedawbon chronicle (Pan Hla 2005: 35–36), which says Wareru ruled for 22 years and died in his 54th year (at age 53). It shows that the Mon Yazawin contains three copying errors: (1) it has mixed the age at accession and the duration of reign; (2) its 25 years is probably 21 years since the Burmese numeral ၁ (1) can be mis-copied as ၅ (5); (3) its 37 years is probably 33 years since the Burmese numeral ၃ (3) can be mis-copied as ၇ (7). After taking the corrections into account, Wareru's age at death would be 53 years, same as Razadarit's reporting.)
Hkun Law	59	4	63	younger brother	
Saw O	19	6	31	son	
Saw Zein	18	7	25	younger brother	
Zein Pun	not reported	7 days	not reported	usurper	
Saw E	not reported	49 days	not reported	son of Saw O	
Binnya E Law	21	23	44	son of Hkun Law	
Binnya U	21 (in 1060 ME), and 24	35	59	son of Saw Zein	(Note: The chronicle (Mon Yazawin 1922: 45) says Binnya U came to power in his 22nd year (at age 21) in 1060 ME [sic]; then on the next page (Mon Yazawin 1922: 46), it says U became king in his 25th year (at age 24). The Razadarit Ayedawbon (Pan Hla 2005: 161) says U became king in his 26th year, and died in his 61st year.)
Razadarit	not reported	38	not reported	son	(Note: The chronicle (Mon Yazawin 1922: 46–49) spends only 3+ pages on King Razadarit, and does not provide the king's age at accession or at death.)
Binnya Dhammaraza	28	3	31 (in 1075 ME)	son	
Binnya Ran I	28 (in 1075 ME)	32	60	younger brother	
Thunekkhat Yaza	21	5	26	son of Binnya Dhammaraza [sic]	
Binnya Kyan	24	3	27	younger brother	
Leik Munhtaw	not reported	7 months	not reported	son of Binnya Ran I	
Shin Sawbu	49	25	74 (in 832 ME)	daughter of Razadarit	
Dhammazedi	47	27	74	son-in-law	
Binnya Ran II	22	35	57 (in 888 ME)	son	
Takayutpi	15	not reported	not reported	son	

== Bibliography ==
- Aung-Thwin, Michael A. (2017). Myanmar in the Fifteenth Century. Honolulu: University of Hawai'i Press. ISBN 978-0-8248-6783-6.
- Pan Hla, Nai (2005) [1968]. Razadarit Ayedawbon (in Burmese) (8th printing ed.). Yangon: Armanthit Sarpay.
- Shwe Naw, ed. (1922) [1785]. Mon Yazawin (in Burmese). Translated by Shwe Naw. Yangon: Burma Publishing Workers Association Press.
