= Binnya Kyan =

Binnya Kyan ဗညားကျန်း

King of Hanthawaddy
- Reign: 30 May 1451 – c. June 1453
- Predecessor: Binnya Waru
- Successor: Leik Munhtaw
- Born: c. 1420 (Note: The chronicle Mon Yazawin (Shwe Naw 1922: 55) says he died at age 27 (28th year) in 1445 after having reigned for 3 years, meaning he was born c. 1417/18. But the chronicle also says he was younger than his predecessor Binnya Waru by two years. Since Binnya Waru was born in 1418/19 per Hmannan Yazawin, Binnya Kyan was probably born around 1420/21.)
- Died: c. June 1453; Pegu
- Father: Binnya Dhammaraza
- Religion: Theravada Buddhism

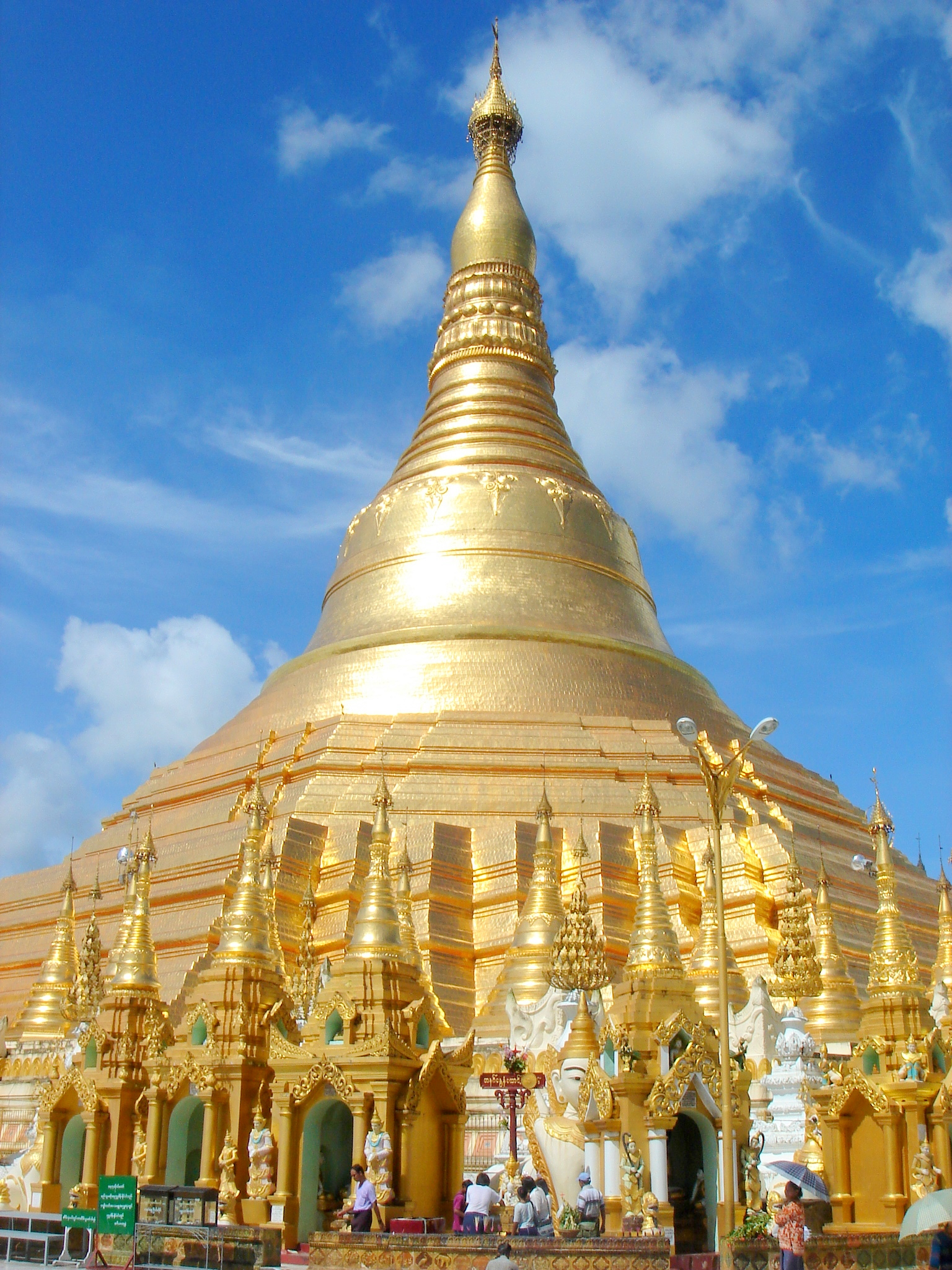
Shwedagon Pagoda

Binnya Kyan (Burmese: ဗညားကျန်း, pronounced [bəɲá dʑáɰ̃]; c. 1420–1453) was the 13th king of the Hanthawaddy Pegu Kingdom in Burma from 1451 to 1453. Binnya Kyan, son of King Binnya Dhammaraza, came to power after assassinating his cousin King Binnya Waru in 1451. One notable project of his reign was the raising of the height of Shwedagon Pagoda to 92 metres (302 ft) from 20 metres (66 ft). The king himself was murdered in 1453 by his first cousin Leik Munhtaw who seized the throne. Despite his raising of the height of the Shwedagon, the king murdered so many of his rivals that by the time he himself was murdered, his killer, first cousin Leik Munhtaw was the last living male descendant of King Razadarit.

== Historiography ==
Various Burmese chronicles do not agree on the key dates of the king's life.

Chronicles	Birth–Death	Age	Reign	Length of reign	Reference
Maha Yazawin	not reported	not reported	June 1450 – 1451/52 and 1450/51–1453/54	1 and 3	(Note: Maha Yazawin is inconsistent. (Maha Yazawin Vol. 2 2006: 81) says he reigned between 812 ME (1450/51) and 813 ME (1451/52). But in its summary section of Hanthawaddy kings, (Maha Yazawin Vol. 2 2006: 140), the chronicle says he reigned between 812 ME and 815 ME (1453/54).)
Slapat Rajawan	c. 1436–1463/64	27	1459/60–1463/64	3	
Hmannan Yazawin	not reported	not reported	June 1450 – 1452/53 and 1450/51–1453/54	2 and 3	(Note: Hmannan Yazawin is inconsistent. (Hmannan Vol. 2 2003: 91) says he reigned between 812 ME (1450/51) and 814 ME (1452/53). But in its summary section of Hanthawaddy kings, (Hmannan Vol. 2 2003: 185), the chronicle says he reigned between 812 ME and 815 ME (1453/54).)
Mon Yazawin (Shwe Naw)		27		3	

== Bibliography ==
- Athwa, Sayadaw (1766). "Slapat des Ragawan der Königsgeschichte". Die äthiopischen Handschriften der K.K. Hofbibliothek zu Wien (in German). 151. Translated by P.W. Schmidt (1906 ed.). Vienna: Alfred Hölder.
- Harvey, G. E. (1925). History of Burma: From the Earliest Times to 10 March 1824. London: Frank Cass & Co. Ltd.
- Kala, U (1724). Maha Yazawin (in Burmese). Vol. 1–3 (2006, 4th printing ed.). Yangon: Ya-Pyei Publishing.
- Pan Hla, Nai (1968). Razadarit Ayedawbon (in Burmese) (8th printing, 2005 ed.). Yangon: Armanthit Sarpay.
- Phayre, Lt. Gen. Sir Arthur P. (1883). History of Burma (1967 ed.). London: Susil Gupta.
- Royal Historical Commission of Burma (1832). Hmannan Yazawin (in Burmese). Vol. 1–3 (2003 ed.). Yangon: Ministry of Information, Myanmar.
- Shwe Naw, ed. (1785). Mon Yazawin (Shwe Naw) (in Burmese). Translated by Shwe Naw (1922 ed.). Yangon: Burma Publishing Workers Association Press.

Binnya Kyan Hanthawaddy Dynasty Born: c. 1420 Died: June 1453
Regnal titles
Preceded by Binnya Waru	King of Hanthawaddy; 1451–1453	Succeeded by Leik Munhtaw
