= Binnya Waru =

Binnya Waru ဗညားဗရူး

King of Hanthawaddy
- Reign: 1446–1451
- Predecessor: Binnya Ran I
- Successor: Binnya Kyan
- Born: c. 1418; Pegu (Bago)
- Died: 30 May 1451; New moon (15th waning) of Nayon 813 ME (Note: Chronicles do not agree on his death year or the manner in which he died. According to Slapat Rajawan, he died in the year in which the court astrologers specifically had advised him not to declare the year as a great leap year (with both leap month and leap day) for he would surely die. The king, the chronicle continues, refused saying that he would not alter the schedule, and he died on the night of the leap day (New moon / 15th waning of Nayon). Main chronicles Maha Yazawin and Hmannan Yazawin say that he was assassinated in Waso 812 ME (10 June 1450 to 8 July 1450), having reigned for four years. But 812 ME was not a leap year, while 813 ME was a great leap year; the king likely died on New Moon of Nayon 813 ME (30 May 1451).); Pegu
- Consort: Ye Mibaya
- House: Wareru
- Father: Binnya Bye
- Mother: Shin Sawbu
- Religion: Theravada Buddhism

Binnya Waru (Burmese: ဗညားဗရူး, pronounced [bəɲá bəjú]; Mon: ဗညားဗရောဝ်; c. 1418–1451) was the 12th king of the Hanthawaddy kingdom in Burma from 1446 to 1451. He was a nephew and adopted son of King Binnya Ran I after whom he succeeded to the Hanthawaddy throne. The king was known for his strict disciplinary rule. He reportedly liked to travel around the kingdom disguised as a commoner to observe the affairs firsthand, and meted out justice even to those who committed petty crimes. Binnya Waru was killed by his first cousin Binnya Kyan, son of King Binnya Dhammaraza, in 1451.

== Brief ==
Binnya Waru was born to Shin Sawbu, a daughter of King Razadarit and Binnya Bye, Razadarit's nephew. He had two sisters Netaka Taw and Netaka Thin. His father died in 1419. In 1423, his mother Shin Sawbu was sent to Ava as a present to King Thihathu of Ava by his uncle Crown Prince Binnya Ran. A year later, after Binnya Ran became king after poisoning King Binnya Dhammaraza, another one of his uncles, Binnya Ran adopted the parent-less Waru as his own. In 1430, his mother Shin Sawbu fled Ava and returned to Pegu. But none of her children, Waru included, recognized her since she had been away for seven years.

He ascended the throne in 1446 after his uncle Binnya Ran I's death and Shin Saw Bu became his queen mother. He reigned for about five years.

== Historiography ==
Various Burmese chronicles do not agree on the key dates of the king's life.

Chronicles	Birth–Death	Age	Reign	Length of reign	Reference
Maha Yazawin (1724)	1420/21–June 1450	29 or 30	1446–June 1450	4	(Note: (Maha Vol. 2 2006: 82): He was assassinated in Waso 812 ME (10 June 1450 to 8 July 1450).)
Slapat Rajawan (1766)	c. 1434 [sic]–1459/60	25	1456/57–1459/60	4 [sic]	(Note: Slapat is inconsistent. (Schmidt 1906: 129) says the king died in 821 ME (1459/60) after having reigned 4 years in his 26th year (aged 25). But the chronicle (Schmidt 1906: 121) also says he came to power in 818 ME (1456/57), which means he could not have ruled for 4 years. Furthermore, he could not have been born c. as the chronicle suggests since his father had been dead for at least 10 years in 1434.)
Mon Yazawin (Shwe Naw) (1785)		26		5	
Hmannan Yazawin (1832)	1418/19–June 1450	31 or 32	1446–June 1450	4	

== Bibliography ==
- Athwa, Sayadaw (1766). "Slapat des Ragawan der Königsgeschichte". Die äthiopischen Handschriften der K.K. Hofbibliothek zu Wien (in German). 151. Translated by P.W. Schmidt (1906 ed.). Vienna: Alfred Hölder.
- Harvey, G. E. (1925). History of Burma: From the Earliest Times to 10 March 1824. London: Frank Cass & Co. Ltd.
- Kala, U (1724). Maha Yazawin (in Burmese). Vol. 1–3 (2006, 4th printing ed.). Yangon: Ya-Pyei Publishing.
- Phayre, Lt. Gen. Sir Arthur P. (1883). History of Burma (1967 ed.). London: Susil Gupta.
- Royal Historical Commission of Burma (1832). Hmannan Yazawin (in Burmese). Vol. 1–3 (2003 ed.). Yangon: Ministry of Information, Myanmar.
- Shwe Naw, ed. (1785). Mon Yazawin (Shwe Naw) (in Burmese). Translated by Shwe Naw (1922 ed.). Yangon: Burma Publishing Workers Association Press.

Binnya Waru Hanthawaddy Dynasty Born: c. 1418 Died: 30 May 1451
Regnal titles
Preceded by Binnya Ran I	King of Hanthawaddy; 1446–1451	Succeeded by Binnya Kyan
Royal titles
Preceded by Binnya Ran I	Heir to the Hanthawaddy Throne; 14?? – 1446	Succeeded by Dhammazedi
