= 1790 in science =

The year 1790 in science and technology involved some significant events.

== Astronomy ==
- Armagh Observatory, founded in Ireland by Richard Robinson, 1st Baron Rokeby, Archbishop of Armagh, begins to function.
- Johann Tobias Lowitz observes a complex halo display in St. Petersburg.

== Biology ==
- English ornithologist John Latham publishes his Index Ornithologicus, including a scientific description of the black swan.
- English botanical illustrator James Sowerby begins publication of his English Botany, with text by James E. Smith.
- Goethe publishes Metamorphosis of Plants.

== Chemistry ==
- July 31 – Samuel Hopkins of Vermont is granted a patent for a potash production technique, the first issued under the 1st United States Congress's Patent Act of 1790.
- Publication in Montpellier of Jean-Antoine Chaptal's Élémens de chimie, in which he coins the word nitrogen (nitrogène).
- Adair Crawford, working with William Cruickshank, proposes the existence of the alkaline earth metal located near Strontian in Scotland which will later be isolated at strontium.

== Physiology and medicine ==
- First recorded case of artificial insemination when British surgeon John Hunter helps impregnate a linen draper's wife.

== Technology ==
- January 30 – Henry Greathead's Original rescue life-boat is tested on the River Tyne in England.

== Awards ==
- Copley Medal: Not awarded

== Births ==
- February 3 – Gideon Mantell, English paleontologist (died 1852)
- March 12 – John Frederic Daniell, English chemist and physicist (died 1845)
- May 23 – Jules Dumont d'Urville, French explorer (died 1842)
- May 30 – John Herapath, English physicist (died 1868)
- July 4 – George Everest, Welsh surveyor and geographer (died 1866)
- October 25 – Robert Stirling, Scottish inventor (died 1878)
- November 17 – August Ferdinand Möbius, German mathematician (died 1868)
- December 9 – Friederike Lienig, Latvian entomologist (d. 1855)
- December 19 – William Edward Parry, English Arctic explorer (died 1855)

== Deaths ==
- February 5 – William Cullen, Scottish physician and chemist (born 1710)
- March 22 – Anthony Addington, English physician (born 1713)
- April 17 – Benjamin Franklin, American statesman and polymath, known for his experiments with electricity (born 1706)
- July 17 – Johann II Bernoulli, Swiss mathematician (born 1710)
