= Binnya Kyan of Martaban =

Binnya Kyan; ဗညားကျန်း

Viceroy of Martaban
- Reign: 1422–1442/43
- Predecessor: Binnya Dhammaraza (as governor)
- Successor: Tala Mi Saw? (as governor)
- Monarch: Binnya Dhammaraza (1422–1424); Binnya Ran I (1424–1442/43)

Governor of Dala
- Reign: by 1414–1422
- Predecessor: unknown
- Successor: Binnya Ran I (in revolt)
- Monarch: Razadarit (1414–1421); Binnya Dhammaraza (1421–1422)
- Born: c. 1395: Pegu (Bago); Hanthawaddy kingdom
- Died: 1442/43: Martaban (Mottama); Hanthawaddy kingdom
- Father: Razadarit
- Religion: Theravada Buddhism

Binnya Kyan (Mon: ဗညာကေန်; Burmese: ဗညားကျန်း, Burmese pronunciation: [bəɲá dʑáɴ]; also spelled Banya Kyan or Binya Keng; c. 1395 – 1442/43) was viceroy of Martaban from 1422 to 1442/43. A son of King Razadarit (r. 1384–1421), Kyan was also governor of Dala from 1414 to 1422, with the title of Binnya Dala.

The prince fought in the Forty Years' War against the northern Ava Kingdom between 1413 and 1418. However, after his father's death in 1421, he sought Ava's assistance during the subsequent power struggle with his elder brothers Binnya Dhammaraza and Binnya Ran. He quickly soured on the plundering Ava forces, reached a power sharing deal with his brothers, and drove back the invaders. He subsequently became viceroy of the province of Martaban where he exercised considerable autonomy. He died in 1442 (or 1443) and was succeeded by his sister.

== Early life ==
Binnya Kyan was a son of King Razadarit of Hanthawaddy Pegu. His mother's name is lost to history. Probably born in the mid 1390s, (Note: Given that his two elder half-brothers were born in 1393 per (Schmidt 1906: 20–21, 118–119) and (Pan Hla 2005: 203), and that he first went to the front alongside his two elder brothers in 1413 per (Yazawin Thit Vol. 1 2012: 245) and (Hmannan Vol. 2 2003: 17), Kyan was probably not much younger than his elder brothers.) the prince grew up at the royal palace in Pegu (Bago) with two elder half-brothers—Binnya Dhammaraza and Binnya Ran—and a younger (half-?) brother Binnya Set. (Note: (Hmmanan Vol. 2 2003: 55): Kyan was younger than both Dhammaraza and Ran. (Pan Hla 2005: 357, footnote 1): According to Pak Lat Chronicles, he was known by the title Anu-Yaza, which according to the editor Pan Hla, can be interpreted as the third prince. As for Binnya Set, chronicles do not say who his mother was.) He also had three (half-) sisters: Tala Mi Kyaw, Tala Mi Saw and Shin Saw Pu. (Note: In addition to Shin Saw Pu, the Razadarit Ayedawbon chronicle (Pan Hla 2005: 224) mentions two more daughters of King Razadarit—Tala Mi Kyaw and Tala Mi Saw.)

Kyan's childhood coincided with the emergence of Pegu as a major power in the region in the 1390s. The kingdom was finally at peace after Razadarit had defeated multiple internal rebellions as well as three invasions by the northern Burmese-speaking Ava Kingdom between 1385 and 1391. Razadarit did renew the war with Ava in 1401 and in 1408 (Note: (Pan Hla 2005: 205) for the 1401–1402 invasion; (Yazawin Thit Vol. 1 2012: 228) and (Hmannan Vol. 1 2003: 477) for the 1408 Arakan expedition.) but Kyan and his brother princes did not take part in the war effort until the 1412–1413 dry season campaign. In April/May 1413, Kyan and his two elder brothers were asked by their father to lead the defense of Dala (modern Twante Township and Dala Township in Yangon Region).

== Prince of Dala ==
In the following five years, the prince proved himself to be a capable commander in several key battles during the Ava–Hanthawaddy War (1408–1418). He became governor of Dala in 1414, and led the defense of the strategic town in 1414–1415 and 1417–1418.

=== Battle of Dala (1413) ===
"Why, when I was a lad of sixteen with only two score men at my back, I won half my kingdom. Minkhaung has a real son; you sons of mine are useless."

— King Razadarit in a motivational speech to his sons

Kyan began his military career when the tide of war had decidedly turned to Ava's favor. Under the leadership of Crown Prince Minye Kyawswa, Ava attacks had increasingly threatened to topple the Mon-speaking kingdom. Indeed, just prior to Kyan's first trip to the front, Razadarit famously motivated his sons that while King Minkhaung of Ava had a brilliant son in Minye Kyawswa, his own sons were completely useless.

The speech apparently worked. In May 1413, the princes drove back Minye Kyawswa's forces outside the town of Dala (modern Twante). In the battle, Kyan, despite being the youngest, led the main battalion (500 troops) while the two elder princes commanded smaller battalions (300 men each) from the flanks. His battalion was however nearly defeated by Minye Kyawswa's cavalry but his brothers came to the rescue, and the Hanthawaddy forces won the day.

=== Appointment at Dala (by 1414) ===
In the following year, Razadarit put his sons in charge of key towns en route to the capital Pegu. By October 1414, (Note: (Yazawin Thit Vol. 1 2012: 251, 253): The appointments took place before Razadarit evacuated to Martaban in Tazaungmon 776 ME (13 October 1414 to 11 November 1414).) when Ava invaded again, Kyan had been made governor of Dala with the title of Binnya Dala (ဗညားဒလ, [bəɲá dəla̰], "Lord of Dala"); the middle son Binnya Ran was in charge of Syriam (Thanlyin) while the eldest son Binnya Dhammaraza was posted at Pegu. To be sure, the king did appoint experienced commanders to aid his sons. At Dala, the king appointed Gen. Smin Awa Naing and 70 military advisers to aid Kyan.

=== Battle of Dala (1414–1415) ===
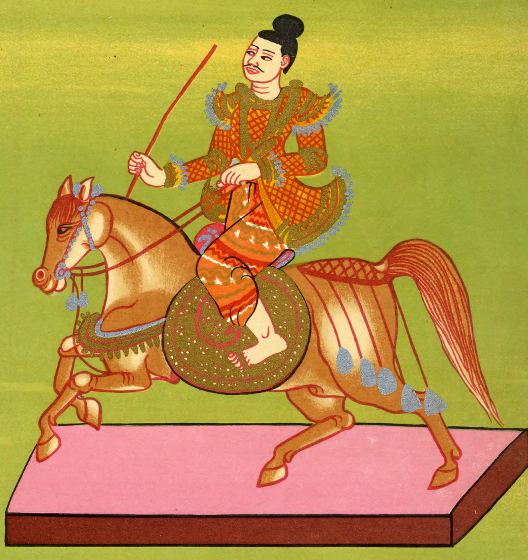
Minye Kyawswa represented as the Min Kyawzwa nat

Kyan was a key figure in one of the most famous battles in Burmese military history. By December, Minye Kyawswa's forces had overcome fierce Hanthawaddy stands at Khebaung, Bassein and Myaungmya, and conquered the entire western delta province. Ava forces then invaded the central Pegu province, laying siege to Dala, Syriam and Dagon. The crown prince himself led the siege of Dala. Kyan withstood the siege but by early February the town was starving. Razadarit sent Commander Emundaya to inform the town's defenses that help was on the way, and to hold on for a few more weeks. (Note: How Emundaya slipped in and out of Ava lines is a legendary tale still retold to date. According to the chronicles (Maha Yazawin Vol. 2 2006: 40–42), (Yazawin Thit Vol. 1 2012: 255–256), (Hmannan Vol. 2 2003: 33–35), Emundaya pretended to have defected to the Ava side near the Dala front. He then managed to get on a front line patrol before making a rush to the Dala side. He informed the Dala leadership about the upcoming help. He then left Dala by acting as a corpse tied to a raft on the river, which slipped through Ava patrols. He made it back to Pegu unharmed.)

For Kyan and his general Awa Naing, the help could not come soon enough. The Pegu command finally settled on a battle plan on 22 February 1415, and the armies led by Razadarit himself left for Dala only on 2 March 1415. (Note: (Yazawin Thit Vol. 1 2012: 256): Full moon of Tabaung 776 ME = 22 February 1415; 8th waning of Tabaung 776 ME = 2 March 1415) A few days later, while Minye Kyawswa at the Syriam front, the Hanthawaddy army broke the siege of Dala. This set up the famous battle outside Dala. On 13 March 1415, Ava forces returned with Minye Kyawswa himself leading the charge on his favorite war elephant. Razadarit fielded a sizable army to meet the enemy. Kyan and his two elder brothers each led a vanguard regiment. The brothers could not stop Minye Kyawswa, who broke through the lines. However, the crown prince of Ava was mortally wounded while fighting Gen. Awa Naing's regiment. Ava forces remained in the vicinity for a few more months. Kyan himself was almost captured by the enemy at the outskirts of Dala but he managed to escape on horseback.

=== Battle of Dala (1417–1418) ===
Kyan did not participate in Pegu's unsuccessful attack on Ava's southern province of Toungoo (Taungoo) in 1416–1417. He was forced to defend Dala when Ava's new crown prince Thihathu invaded in the following dry season. Ava forces captured Dagon but could not break Hanthawaddy defenses at Syriam or Dala. At Dala, Kyan successfully withstood Ava's repeated charges. It was the last campaign during the reigns of kings Minkhaung I of Ava and Razadarit, both of which ended in 1421.

== In rebellion ==
In late 1421, kings Minkhaung and Razadarit suddenly died within two months of each other. While Thihathu succeeded without incident at Ava, the succession at Pegu was not orderly. The reason was that Razadarit, who was not yet 54, had not appointed an heir apparent. The eldest son Dhammaraza claimed the throne by primogeniture but Kyan and Ran disagreed. (Their other brother Binnya Set was no longer in contention; the prince of Dagon was captured by Ava forces, and taken back to Ava (Inwa) in 1418.)

A frantic power struggle ensued. Kyan at Dala and Ran at Syriam initially entered into an alliance in opposition of Dhammaraza. But no one trusted each other. Kyan raced to seize Dagon (modern downtown Yangon), the town immediately north of Dala, and northwest of Syriam. Meanwhile, the forces loyal to Dhammaraza took Dala. Ran did not take kindly to Kyan's takeover of Dagon, and accepted an offer from Dhammaraza to become crown prince. Kyan was now holed up at Dagon without any allies, and in desperation, sought assistance from the archenemy Ava. In early 1422, Kyan retook Dala with the help of two regiments sent by Thihathu.

But Kyan immediately became disenchanted with his allies. The prince was disgusted by the looting and deportation of townsfolk by the Ava forces. He soon entered into secret talks with Dhammaraza, and quickly reached agreement with his brother. In exchange for his support, Dhammaraza agreed to restore Kyan to his post at Dala, and then to assign a substantial post, to be determined later. Dhammaraza sent another army to Dala while Kyan treacherously engineered the murder of principal officers of the Ava army inside Dala. Only about half the Ava troops made it back to their base at Prome (Pyay).

The looming Ava threat helped Kyan and Ran in their subsequent negotiations with Dhammaraza, who ultimately agreed to share power. He gave the Bassein province (modern Ayeyarwady Region) in the west to Ran, and the Martaban province (modern Mon State and southern Kayin State) in the east to Kyan, leaving only the Pegu province (modern Yangon Region and southern Bago Region) for himself. Kyan was satisfied. The city of Martaban (Mottama) was not only the original capital of the dynasty, but also a prosperous entrepôt that produced lucrative tax revenues. The prince left Dala for Martaban before November 1422. (Note: (Yazawin Thit Vol. 1 2012: 267–268) and (Hmannan Vol. 2 2003: 55–56): before Ava's invasion began in Nadaw 784 ME (14 November 1422 to 12 December 1422))

== Viceroy of Martaban ==
At Martaban, Kyan ruled the province like a sovereign. He did not interfere in the subsequent power struggle between Dhammaraza and Ran, who brazenly occupied Dala and Dagon, part of the Pegu province, as soon as Kyan left for Martaban. Kyan did not offer any help to Ran when Ava invaded in November/December 1422. His quasi-independent rule at Martaban continued even after Dhammaraza was assassinated by poison by one of his queens in 1424. Ran took over the throne but allowed Kyan to exercise considerable autonomy at Martaban.

The pact between the two brothers lasted. In exchange for his autonomy, Kyan shared Martaban's lucrative commercial revenues with the crown. He ruled the province for another 18 years until his death. Kyan was succeeded by his sister, who may have been Princess Tala Mi Saw. (Note: (Phayre 1873: 120) and (Aung-Thwin 2017: 262) say that Kyan was succeeded by his sister who was married to a high ranking official. Neither source explicitly names the sister. The chronicle Razadarit Ayedawbon (Pan Hla 2005) mentions only three daughters of Razadarit: Tala Mi Kyaw, Tala Mi Saw and Shin Saw Pu. The succeeding sister could not be Tala Mi Kyaw, who per (Pan Hla 2005: 224) was captured by Ava forces in 1402, and was never returned. Nor could she be Princess Shin Saw Pu, who had been unmarried since 1429, and later became queen regnant of Hanthawaddy per (Hmannan Vol. 2 2003: 92). None of the main chronicles mentions Shin Saw Pu's stay at Martaban in any case. This leaves Tala Mi Saw, who per (Pan Hla 2005: 224) was married to the famous general Smin Bayan Upakaung.)

== Bibliography ==
- Athwa, Sayadaw (1906) [1766]. "Slapat des Ragawan der Königsgeschichte". Die äthiopischen Handschriften der K.K. Hofbibliothek zu Wien (in German). 151. Translated by P.W. Schmidt. Vienna: Alfred Hölder.
- Aung-Thwin, Michael A. (2017). Myanmar in the Fifteenth Century. Honolulu: University of Hawai'i Press. ISBN 978-0-8248-6783-6.
- Harvey, G. E. (1925). History of Burma: From the Earliest Times to 10 March 1824. London: Frank Cass & Co. Ltd.
- Kala, U (2006) [1724]. Maha Yazawin (in Burmese). Vol. 1–3 (4th printing ed.). Yangon: Ya-Pyei Publishing.
- Maha Sithu (2012) [1798]. Myint Swe; Kyaw Win; Thein Hlaing (eds.). Yazawin Thit (in Burmese). Vol. 1–3 (2nd printing ed.). Yangon: Ya-Pyei Publishing.
- Pan Hla, Nai (2005) [1968]. Razadarit Ayedawbon (in Burmese) (8th printing ed.). Yangon: Armanthit Sarpay.
- Phayre, Major Gen. Sir Arthur P. (1873). "The History of Pegu". Journal of the Asiatic Society of Bengal. 42. Oxford University.
- Royal Historical Commission of Burma (2003) [1832]. Hmannan Yazawin (in Burmese). Vol. 1–3. Yangon: Ministry of Information, Myanmar.

Binnya Kyan of Martaban Hanthawaddy Dynasty Born: c. 1395 Died: 1442/43
Royal titles
Preceded by Binnya Dhammaraza as governor	Viceroy of Martaban; 1422–1442/43	Succeeded by Tala Mi Saw? as governor
Unknown	Governor of Dala by 1414–1422	Succeeded by Binnya Ran I
