= Mi Ta-Lat =

Mi Ta-Lat မည်တလတ်

Principal Queen Consort of Hanthawaddy
- Tenure: 1421 – 1424
- Spouse: Binnya Dhammaraza
- House: Hanthawaddy Pegu
- Father: Smin Awa Naing
- Religion: Theravada Buddhism

Mi Ta-Lat (Burmese: မည်တလတ်, Burmese pronunciation: [mì tə laʔ]) was a principal queen consort of King Binnya Dhammaraza of Hanthawaddy Pegu. Daughter of Governor General Smin Awa Naing, Ta-Lat was married to Prince Dhammaraza by 1415. (Note: Yazawin Thit (Yazawin Thit Vol. 2 2012: 263) and Hmannan (Hmannan Vol. 2 2003: 48): King Minkhaung I addressed Awa Naing as (နောင်တော် ခမက်တော်; naungdaw, khamettaw, "royal elder brother", "royal in-law"). (Hmannan Vol. 2 2003: 48) adds the reason he was addressed that way is that Awa Naing's daughter Mi Ta-Lat was married to Dhammaraza. Furthermore, the referral was made soon after Minye Kyawswa's death (13 March 1415).)

== Bibliography ==
- Maha Sithu (2012) [1798]. Kyaw Win; Thein Hlaing (eds.). Yazawin Thit (in Burmese). Vol. 1–3 (2nd ed.). Yangon: Ya-Pyei Publishing.
- Royal Historical Commission of Burma (2003) [1832]. Hmannan Yazawin (in Burmese). Vol. 1–3. Yangon: Ministry of Information, Myanmar.
