= Binnya Dhammaraza =

Binnya Dhammaraza ဗညား ဓမ္မရာဇာ

King of Hanthawaddy
- Reign: c. December 1421 – c. late 1424
- Predecessor: Razadarit
- Successor: Binnya Ran I
- Born: c. January 1393 c. Tabodwe 754 ME; Pegu (Bago); Hanthawaddy kingdom
- Died: c. late 1424 (aged 31); 786 ME; Pegu; Hanthawaddy Kingdom
- Consort: Mi Ta-Lat
- Issue: Binnya Kyan
- House: Wareru
- Father: Razadarit
- Religion: Theravada Buddhism

Binnya Dhammaraza (Mon: ဗညာ ဓမ္မရာဇာ, Burmese: ဗညား ဓမ္မရာဇာ, Burmese pronunciation: [bəɲá dəma̰jàzà]; also spelled Banya Dhamma Yaza; 1393–1424) was king of Hanthawaddy Pegu from 1421 to 1424. His short reign was marked by rebellions by his half-brothers Binnya Ran and Binnya Kyan; renewed invasions by the Ava Kingdom; and various court intrigues. He never had any real control beyond the capital Pegu (Bago), and was poisoned by one of his queens in 1424. He was succeeded by Binnya Ran.

== Early life ==
Born c. early 1393, (Note: The Slapat Rajawan (Schmidt 1906: 20–21, 118–119) says Binnya Dhammaraza came to power in his 29th year (at age 28) in 783 ME (30 March 1421 to 29 March 1422), meaning he was born in 1392 or 1393. Since King Razadarit died c. early Tabodwe 783 ME (December 1383), in order for Dhammaraza to be still aged 28 at his accession, he must have been born in or after Tabodwe 754 ME (13 January 1393 to 10 February 1393). The Razadarit Ayedawbon says Binnya Dhammaraza was older than Binnya Ran I who the chronicle (Pan Hla 2005: 203) says was born before Kason 755 ME (11 April 1393 to 10 May 1393). In sum, Binnya Dhammaraza and Binnya Ran were born sometime between January and April 1393, with Dhammaraza born before Ran.) Binnya Dhammaraza was a son of King Razadarit of Hanthawaddy (r. 1384–1421). His mother's name is lost to history although she may have been one of the principal queens since her son became the heir-presumptive. (Note: His mother was most probably not Queen Thuddhamaya, who delivered Binnya Ran shortly after. Given that he was the heir-presumptive, Dhammaraza was likely born to a senior queen. According to the Razadarit (Pan Hla 2005: 203), Razadarit's first chief queen Piya Yaza Dewi died around 1392/1393, and the king subsequently raised three senior queens around the same period: Yaza Dewi, Lawka Dewi, Thiri Maya Dewi.) According to the Pak Lat Chronicles, his childhood princely title was Binnya Kyan (Mon: ဗညာကေန်, Burmese: ဗညားကျန်း, [bəɲá tɕáɴ]). He had at least three younger (half-) brothers, and at least three (half-) sisters.

As the eldest living son of Razadarit, (Note: Razadarit's eldest child and son Baw Law Kyan Daw was executed in 1390.) the prince grew up as the heir-presumptive at the royal palace in Pegu (Bago). His childhood coincided with the emergence of his father's kingdom as a major power in the region in the 1390s. He and his brother princes saw no war in their formative years. Even when Razadarit twice renewed the war against the northern Ava Kingdom in 1401 and in 1408, the princes did not part in the war until the 1412–1413 dry season. The king famously motivated his sons that while King Minkhaung of Ava had a brilliant son in Minye Kyawswa, his own sons were completely useless.

== Ava war ==
Prompted by Razadarit's tirade, Dhammaraza and his brother princes went to war. To be sure, the Pegu high command initially was not sure about Dhammaraza's abilities. Despite being the eldest, Dhammaraza was not the first son to go to the front. It was Dhammaraza's younger half-brother and rival Prince Binnya Bassein (future King Binnya Ran I) that went to the Prome front in November 1412. When Dhammaraza went to the front for the first time in May 1413, he was already 20 years old, an old age for princes of the era to take the field for the first time, and he did not command the main army. He and Binnya Bassein commanded smaller armies at the flanks while Prince Binnya Dala (future Viceroy Binnya Kyan of Martaban), the youngest of the three, commanded the main army.

Dhammaraza proved capable. In his first battle, outside Dala (modern Twante), he and Binnya Bassein drove back Minye Kyawswa after Binnya Dala's main army had been defeated. The performance won him the honor of defending the capital Pegu in 1414–1415 when Razadarit decided to retreat to Martaban. Binnya Bassein and Binnya Dala bore the brunt of Ava's attacks but it was Dhammaraza that led the counterattack. On 13 March 1415, in one of the most famous battles in Burmese military history, Dhammaraza's vanguard regiment took on Minye Kyawswa. Although he was driven back and other Hanthawaddy forces were nearly defeated, the crown prince of Ava was mortally wounded in the battle.

A larger assignment followed. In 1416, Razadarit appointed Dhammaraza to lead an invasion of Toungoo (Taungoo), Ava's southeastern territory. But the prince and his army (7 regiments, 7000 men, 500 horses, 30 elephants) were decisively defeated outside Toungoo by Prince Thihathu of Prome. The quick and severe defeat apparently dimmed Dhammaraza's star. When Ava invaded in 1417–1418, he was not involved in the frontline battles as were his younger brothers. He did not get a chance to redeem himself as the war entered a lull for the rest of Razadarit's reign—to 1421.

== Rise to power ==
The war did not produce a breakout performer among Razadarit's sons. Although Dhammaraza's record was less than stellar, Binnya Bassein (now known as Binnya Ran), and in Binnya Dala (now known as Binnya Kyan) too had uneven performances. The war, however, did eliminate a potential claimant when Ava forces captured another son of Razadarit, Prince Binnya Set of Dagon, and brought him back to Ava in 1418. In any case, when Razadarit suddenly died from a hunting accident in 1421, the still energetic 53-year-old king had not formally anointed an heir-apparent. He had at most given only governorships to his sons: Dhammaraza at Martaban (Mottama), Ran at Syriam (Thanlyin), and Kyan at Dala (Twante). (Note: At the time of Razadarit's death, the eldest son of Razadarit named Binnya Kyan [sic] was governor of Martaban per the Pak Lat Chronicles (Pan Hla 2005: 357); and per (Hmannan Vol. 2 2003: 26, 55) the middle brother Binnya Ran was in charge of Syriam, and the youngest Binnya Kyan was governor of Dala.)

By primogeniture, Dhammaraza claimed the throne. But Ran and Kyan openly contested. Dhammaraza's chief rival was Ran, who was only a few months younger than him, and deemed the alternative by the court. Although Chief Minister Dein Mani-Yut did not take sides between Dhammaraza and Ran, the eldest prince apparently garnered enough support at the court to be crowned king at Pegu. His regnal title, according to Pak Lat, was Thudaw Dhamma Razadarit.

== Reign ==
=== Initial rebellions ===
Upon Dhammaraza's accession at Pegu, Ran and Kyan immediately revolted out of fortified towns just within 120 km south of the capital. Ran held the key port of Syriam while Kyan seized Dagon (modern downtown Yangon) across the river from Syriam. Dhammaraza quickly pacified Ran by making him heir apparent. But he took a tougher line against Kyan by sending an army to take Dala. The expedition was successful but it also cornered Kyan, who now sought help from King Thihathu of Ava.

=== Renewal of war with Ava ===
Ava was eager to take advantage. Thihathu, who himself had ascended the Ava throne just two months before Dhammaraza's accession at Pegu, quickly sent down two regiments (2000 troops). In early 1422, Kyan's army aided by Ava troops defeated the Pegu army at Dala. Kyan had army commanders Smin Maw-Khwin and Smin Pun-Si, Dhammaraza loyalists, executed.

Pegu now faced a serious foreign-backed rebellion at its doorstep. Fortunately for Dhammaraza, Kyan had a change of heart. Disgusted by the looting and deportation of townsfolk by Ava troops at Dala, the prince entered into secret negotiations with Dhammaraza to drive out the Ava troops. An initial deal was quickly reached. In exchange for Kyan's support, Dhammaraza agreed to restore Kyan to his post at Dala, and then to assign a substantial post, to be determined later. The king sent another army to Dala while Kyan treacherously engineered the murder of principal officers of the Ava army inside Dala. Only about half the Ava troops made it back to their base at Prome (Pyay).

=== Appeasement ===
Knowing that Ava would return in the dry season, Dhammaraza desperately tried to keep the support of his brothers by sharing power. He gave the Bassein province (modern Ayeyarwady Region) in the west to Ran, and the Martaban province (modern Mon State and southern Kayin State) in the east to Kyan, leaving only the Pegu province (modern Yangon Region and southern Bago Region) to himself.

But the appeasement did not work. While Kyan was satisfied, and moved to Martaban, Ran wanted more. The crown prince still had the support of a court faction, and harbored ambitions to be king. As soon as Kyan left for Martaban, Ran brazenly occupied Dala and Dagon, which belonged to the Pegu province. According to Phayre, Ran's "ungrateful conduct" was a result of the king being hamstrung by various court factions. Before the eve of Ava's dry season invasion, Ran actually controlled the most territory—the entire Irrawaddy delta as well as the southern Pegu province—while the king controlled just around the capital. (Ran was also in control of Tharrawaddy, a territory claimed by Ava.)

=== Second Ava invasion ===
Indeed, Dhammaraza did not have a country to defend when Ava invaded in November/December 1422. (Note: (Hmannan Vol. 2 2003: 56): Nadaw 784 ME = 14 November 1422 to 12 December 1422) It was Ran's delta region that 14,000-strong Ava forces led by Gen. Thado and Prince Min Nyo invaded by land and river. Ran's forces were no match for more numerous Ava forces, which quickly seized the entire delta and Dala. Ran fell back to defend from his last possession at Dagon, which was heavily fortified. A month into the siege, in January 1423, Ran proposed a marriage alliance by offering his younger sister Shin Saw Pu to Thihathu. He also acknowledged Ava's control of Tharrawaddy. (Note: (Phayre 1873: 120): Binnya Ran controlled (or at least claimed) Tharrawaddy, early in his rebellion against Dhammaraza. (Yazawin Thit Vol. 2 269): In 1423, Thihathu went on an elephant hunting trip at Tharrawaddy upon his return trip from Dagon, having married Shin Saw Pu.) At Ava, Thihathu accepted the offer, and sailed down the Irrawaddy with 7000 more troops. After the marriage between Thihathu and Shin Saw Pu at Dagon, Ava forces withdrew.

=== Aftermath ===
In all, Dhammaraza was a total bystander in the affairs with Ava. The king remained at the capital only with nominal authority. The stalemate went on for about another year and a half. After a reign of about three years, the king died, apparently poisoned by one of his queens. The poisoning may have been "instigated, it is supposed, by Binnya Ran", who succeeded. Binnya Dhammaraza was 31 (in his 32nd year).

== Family ==
Not much is known about the king's immediate family. One of his consorts was Mi Ta-Lat, daughter Governor–General Smin Awa Naing. He and Ta-Lat had been married at least since 1415. (Note: Both Yazawin Thit (Yazawin Thit Vol. 2 2012: 263) and Hmannan (Hmannan Vol. 2 2003: 48) say that Smin Awa Naing referred to Razadarit as his elder brother and parent-in-law (နောင်တော် ခမက်တော်; naungdaw, khamettaw). (Hmannan Vol. 2 2003: 48) adds that the reason as to why Awa Naing referred to Razadarit that way was that Awa Naing's daughter Mi Ta-Lat was married to Dhammaraza. Furthermore, the referral was made soon after Minye Kyawswa's death (13 March 1415).) He had a son, King Binnya Kyan (r. 1451–1453).

== Historiography ==
Most of the Burmese chronicles provide little information about the king's life. Only the Slapat Rajawan explicitly mentions his year of accession, age at accession, length of reign, and age at death altogether. Part of the information in the following table is derived from the available information in the chronicles about his half-siblings Queen Shin Saw Pu and King Binnya Ran I.

Source	Birth–Death	Age at accession	Age at death	Reign	Length of reign	Reference
Razadarit Ayedawbon (c. 1560s)	by April 1393 – 1424/25	at least 28	at least 31	1421/22–1424/25	3 years	(Note: (Pan Hla 2005: 197, 203): Ran was born before Kason 755 ME (11 April 1393 to 10 May 1393). Since Dhammaraza was older than Ran, he must have been born before April/May 1393 as well. (Pan Hla 2005: 356, footnote 1): Binnya Dala's version of the chronicle says Razadarit died in 783 ME (30 March 1421 to 29 March 1422). (Pan Hla 2005: 369): Binnya Dhammaraza reigned 3 years.)
Maha Yazawin (1724)	by April 1395 – 1426/27	at least 28	at least 31	1423/24–1426/27	3	(Note: Approximate birth date derived from Shin Saw Pu's birth date of Wed, 12th waxing of Tabaung 757 ME [sic] (Saturday, 19 February 1396) per (Maha Yazawin Vol. 2 2006: 82). This means her full brother Binnya Ran was likely born by c. April 1395, if not earlier. Since Dhammaraza was older than Ran, he must have been born by April 1395. (Maha Yazawin Vol. 2 2006: 56–57): Razadarit died in the following year after Minkhaung I's death in 784 ME, and was succeeded by Dhammaraza. (Maha Yazawin Vol. 2 2006: 140): Dhammaraza reigned three years.)
Slapat Rajawan (1766)	c. 1393	28 (29th year)	31 (32nd year)	1421/22–1424/25	3	
Mon Yazawin (Shwe Naw) (1785, 1922)	c. 1682–1713/14 [sic]		31 (32nd year)	1710/11–1713/14 [sic]	3	(Note: (Shwe Naw 1922: 49): The king died in 1075 ME (1713/1714 CE) in his 32nd year (at age 31).)
Yazawin Thit (1798)	unmentioned	unmentioned	unmentioned	1421/22–?	unmentioned	(Note: (Yazawin Thit Vol. 1 2012: 265): Minkhaung died in 783 ME; Razadarit died two months later in the same year (783 ME), and was succeeded by Dhammaraza.)
Hmannan Yazawin (1832)	by April 1393 – 1426/27	at least 30	at least 33	1423/24–1426/27	3	(Note: Approximate birth date derived from Shin Saw Pu's birth date of Wed, 12th waxing of Tabaung 755 ME (11 February 1394) per (Hmannan Vol. 2 2003: 92). This means her full brother Binnya Ran was likely born by c. April 1393, if not earlier. Since Dhammaraza was older than Ran, he must have been born by April 1393.)
Pak Lat Chronicles (1912)	?–1423/24	?	?	1420/21–1423/24	3	

== Bibliography ==
- Athwa, Sayadaw (1906) [1766]. "Slapat des Ragawan der Königsgeschichte". Die äthiopischen Handschriften der K.K. Hofbibliothek zu Wien (in German). 151. Translated by P.W. Schmidt. Vienna: Alfred Hölder.
- Aung-Thwin, Michael A. (2017). Myanmar in the Fifteenth Century. Honolulu: University of Hawai'i Press. ISBN 978-0-8248-6783-6.
- Harvey, G. E. (1925). History of Burma: From the Earliest Times to 10 March 1824. London: Frank Cass & Co. Ltd.
- Htin Aung, Maung (1967). A History of Burma. New York and London: Cambridge University Press.
- Kala, U (2006) [1724]. Maha Yazawin (in Burmese). Vol. 1–3 (4th printing ed.). Yangon: Ya-Pyei Publishing.
- Maha Sithu (2012) [1798]. Kyaw Win; Thein Hlaing (eds.). Yazawin Thit (in Burmese). Vol. 1–3 (2nd ed.). Yangon: Ya-Pyei Publishing.
- Pan Hla, Nai (2005) [1968]. Razadarit Ayedawbon (in Burmese) (8th printing ed.). Yangon: Armanthit Sarpay.
- Phayre, Major Gen. Sir Arthur P. (1873). "The History of Pegu". Journal of the Asiatic Society of Bengal. 42. Oxford University.
- Phayre, Lt. Gen. Sir Arthur P. (1967) [1883]. History of Burma. London: Susil Gupta.
- Royal Historical Commission of Burma (2003) [1832]. Hmannan Yazawin (in Burmese). Vol. 1–3. Yangon: Ministry of Information, Myanmar.
- Shwe Naw, ed. (1922) [1785]. Mon Yazawin (Shwe Naw) (in Burmese). Translated by Shwe Naw. Yangon: Burma Publishing Workers Association Press.

Binnya Dhammaraza Hanthawaddy Dynasty Born: c. January 1393 Died: c. late 1424
Regnal titles
Preceded by Razadarit	King of Hanthawaddy; 1421–1424	Succeeded by Binnya Ran I
Royal titles
Preceded by Baw Law Kyan Daw	Heir-presumptive of Hanthawaddy; 1393–1421	Succeeded by Binnya Ran I
