= Leik Munhtaw =

Leik Munhtaw လိပ်မွတ်ထော

King of Hanthawaddy
- Reign: c. June 1453 – January 1454
- Predecessor: Binnya Kyan
- Successor: Shin Sawbu
- Born: c. 1432; Pegu (Bago); Hanthawaddy kingdom
- Died: c. January 1454; Pegu (Bago); Hanthawaddy kingdom
- Father: Binnya Ran I
- Mother: Soe Min Wimala Dewi
- Religion: Theravada Buddhism

Leik Munhtaw (Burmese: လိပ်မွတ်ထော, pronounced [leiʔ mʊ̀ɰ̃ tʰɔ́]; Mon: မမောဟ်ထာဝ်; c. 1432–1454) was the 14th king of the Hanthawaddy Pegu Kingdom in Burma for seven months in 1453–54. He came to power by assassinating his first cousin King Binnya Kyan. Binnya Kyan himself had come to power in 1451 by murdering his cousin King Binnya Waru, and went on to kill off male descendants of King Razadarit. Leik Munhtaw, son of King Binnya Ran I and a grandson of Razadarit, got to Binnya Kyan, also a grandson of Razadarit, first. Leik Munhtaw went on to kill more rivals. In early 1454, palace ministers killed Leik Munhtaw, leaving no male heir of Razadarit's line. The ministers chose his daughter Shin Sawbu to be the next ruler of Hanthawaddy.

== Brief ==
Various Burmese chronicles do not agree on the key dates of the king's life.

| Chronicles | Birth–Death | Age | Reign | Length of reign | Reference |
|---|---|---|---|---|---|
| Maha Yazawin | c. 1438–1451/52 and c. 1438–1453/54 | ~13 and ~15 | 1451/52 and 1453/54 | 7 months | (Note: (Maha Yazawin Vol. 2: 70): He was born after his mother was given to Binnya Ran in 798 ME (1436/37), later corrected by Hmannan as 792 ME (1430/31). The chronicle also reports two different death dates: (Maha Vol. 2 2006: 81) gives 813 ME (1451/52) while the summary section of Hanthawaddy kings (Maha Yazawin Vol. 2 2006: 140) gives 815 ME (1453/54).) |
| Slapat Rajawan | not reported | not reported | 1463/64 | 7 months | |
| Hmannan Yazawin | c. 1432–1452/53 and c. 1432–1453/54 | ~21 and ~22 | 1452/53 and 1453/54 | 7 months | (Note: (Hmannan Vol. 2: 74): He was born after his mother was given to Binnya Ran in 1430/31. The chronicle also reports two different death dates: (Hmannan Vol. 2 2003: 91) gives 814 ME (1452/53) while its summary of Hanthawaddy kings section (Hmannan Vol. 2 2003: 185) gives 815 ME (1453/54).) |
| Mon Yazawin (Shwe Naw) | not reported | not reported | c. 1445/46 | 7 months | (Note: (Shwe Naw 1922: 55) says Leik Munhtaw reigned for 7 months but does not provide any other information. (Shwe Naw 1922: 69) says his successor Shin Sawbu reigned for 25 years and died in 832 ME (1470/71), which implies that Leik Munhtaw died c. 807 ME (1445/46).) |

== Bibliography ==
- Athwa, Sayadaw (1766). "Slapat des Ragawan der Königsgeschichte". Die äthiopischen Handschriften der K.K. Hofbibliothek zu Wien (in German). 151. Translated by P.W. Schmidt (1906 ed.). Vienna: Alfred Hölder.
- Harvey, G. E. (1925). History of Burma: From the Earliest Times to 10 March 1824. London: Frank Cass & Co. Ltd.
- Kala, U (1724). Maha Yazawin (in Burmese). Vol. 1–3 (2006, 4th printing ed.). Yangon: Ya-Pyei Publishing.
- Phayre, Lt. Gen. Sir Arthur P. (1883). History of Burma (1967 ed.). London: Susil Gupta.
- Royal Historical Commission of Burma (1832). Hmannan Yazawin (in Burmese). Vol. 1–3 (2003 ed.). Yangon: Ministry of Information, Myanmar.
- Shwe Naw, ed. (1785). Mon Yazawin (Shwe Naw) (in Burmese). Translated by Shwe Naw (1922 ed.). Yangon: Burma Publishing Workers Association Press.

Leik Munhtaw Hanthawaddy Dynasty Born: c. 1432 Died: c. January 1454
Regnal titles
| Preceded by Binnya Kyan | King of Hanthawaddy c. June 1453 – January 1454 | Succeeded by Shin Sawbu |
