= Furnivall =

Furnivall or Furnival is a surname. Notable people with the surname include:

- Frederick James Furnivall (1825–1910), co-creator of the New English Dictionary
- Kate Furnivall British historical novelist
- Percy Furnivall (1868–1938), British surgeon
- John Sydenham Furnivall (1878–1960), British civil servant in Burma
- Gerard de Furnival, Norman knight
