= Binnya Ran I =

Binnya Ran I ပထမ ဗညာရာံ ပထမ ဗညားရံ

King of Hanthawaddy
- Reign: 1424–1446
- Predecessor: Binnya Dhammaraza
- Successor: Binnya Waru
- Born: c. April 1393 c. Kason 755 ME; Pegu (Bago)
- Died: c. September 1446 (aged 53) c. early Thadingyut 808 ME (Note: (Pan Hla 2005: 361, footnote 2): Per Pak Lat Chronicles, he died at age 53 (54th year) in 808 ME (30 March 1446 to 29 March 1447). (Hmanann Vol. 2 2003: 88) suggests he was dead by 5th waxing of Thadingyut 808 ME (25 September 1446).); Pegu (Bago)
- Consort: Yaza Dewi; Soe Min Wimala Dewi; Saw Min Aung
- Issue: Leik Munhtaw
- Rama Razadarit
- House: Wareru
- Father: Razadarit
- Mother: Thuddhamaya
- Religion: Theravada Buddhism

Binnya Ran I (Mon: ပထမ ဗညာရာံ; Burmese: ပထမ ဗညားရံ, Burmese pronunciation: [pətʰəma̰ bəɲá jàɰ̃]; 1393–1446) was king of Hanthawaddy Pegu from 1424 to 1446. As crown prince, he ended the Forty Years' War with the rival Ava Kingdom in 1423. He came to the throne after poisoning his brother King Binnya Dhammaraza in 1424. As king, Binnya Ran largely kept his kingdom at peace for much of his 20-year reign when Ava was struggling to keep its territories intact. He pursued an opportunistic policy to keep Ava weak, helping Toungoo's rebellion against Ava between 1437 and 1442 during which he placed his son as the viceroy of Toungoo. When Ava reconquered Toungoo in 1442, he did not resume a large-scale war against Ava.

== Crown Prince ==
Binnya Ran was born to Queen Thuddhamaya and King Razadarit. After Razadarit's death, Binnya Dhammaraza became king. Binnya Ran and Binnya Kyan immediately revolted against their elder brother. Binnya Dhammaraza pacified Binnya Ran for a time by making him the heir-apparent and governor of Pathein (Bassein) and the entire Irrawaddy delta. Binnya Dhammaraza also pacified Binnya Kyan by making him governor of Martaban. But Binnya Ran was not satisfied. He soon extended his territory, and occupied Dagon (Yangon) in 1423. When Ava forces came to occupy Dala opposite Dagon, Binnya Ran presented his elder sister Shin Sawbu to Thihathu, and bought peace. Ava forces withdrew, ending the Forty Years' War between Ava and Hanthawaddy Pegu.

In 1424, Binnya Ran poisoned Binnya Dhammaraza and became the eleventh king of Hanthawaddy. His reign name, as reported in Mon language inscriptions, was Rama Razadarit (ရာမ ရာဇာဓိရာဇ်; Pali: Rāma Rājādhirāj).

== Reign ==
As king, Binnya Ran allowed Binnya Kyan to remain as governor of Martaban where the latter exercised almost independent authority. He soon became involved with the dynastic intrigues of Ava Kingdom. In 1426, Mohnyin Thado ascended the Ava throne. In 1429, his sister Shin Sawbu fled secretly from Ava back to Pegu. Binnya Ran received his elder sister with great honor. In the same year, Thinkhaya III, the governor of Toungoo sought Binnya Ran's alliance against Ava by presenting a daughter. Binnya Ran agreed and attacked Prome (Pyay) together with Toungoo governor's forces. Mohnyin Thado broke up the alliance by giving a niece, Soe Min Wimala Dewi, to Binnya Ran. The Pegu king accepted the peace offer as he did not want renewed fighting.

The alliance was one of convenience for Binnya Ran. He was happy to see that Mohnyin Thado was having trouble with Shan raids into Avan territory throughout the 1430s. When Toungoo revolted again in 1437, Binnya Ran readily provided assistance for Toungoo. With his help, Toungoo defeated Ava, and Binnya Ran's son Minsaw became the viceroy of Toungoo. However, King Minye Kyawswa I of Ava reconquered Toungoo in 1440, and appointed Tarabya, a Shan chief. For the remainder of his reign, he was content to see Ava had its hands full with Ming Chinese invasions and Shan raids.

Binnya Ran died after a reign of approximately 22 years, and was succeeded by nephew and adopted son Binnya Waru, a son of Shin Sawbu.

== Historiography ==
Various Burmese chronicles do not agree on the key dates of the king's life.

| Chronicles | Birth–Death | Age | Reign | Length of reign | Reference |
|---|---|---|---|---|---|
| Razadarit Ayedawbon | c. April 1393–? | | | | (Note: (Pan Hla 2005: 203): He was born before Kason [of 755 ME].) |
| Maha Yazawin and Hmannan Yazawin | ?–1446/47 | not reported | 1426/27–1446/47 | 20 | (Note: (Hmanann Vol. 2 2003: 88) suggests he was dead by the 5th waxing of Thadingyut 808 ME (25 September 1446).) |
| Slapat Rajawan | c. 1395–1456/57 | 61 | 1424/25–1456/57 | 32 | |
| Pak Lat | c. 1393–1446/47 (or c. 1395–1446/47) | 53 (or 51) | 1423/24–1446/47 | 23 | (Note: Pak Lat reporting is inconsistent. (Pan Hla 2005: 361, fn 1): Pak Lat says that Binnya Ran I became king at age 28 (29th year) at 785 ME (30 March 1423 to 28 March 1424), meaning he was born c. 1395; and that he died at age 53 (54th year) in 808 ME (30 March 1446 to 29 March 1447), meaning he was born c. 1393.) |
| Mon Yazawin (Shwe Naw) | c. 1685–1745/46 [sic] | 60 | 1713/14–1745/46 [sic] | 32 | (Note: (Shwe Naw 1922: 49): Binnya Dhammaraza died in 1075 ME (1713/1714 CE), followed by Binnya Ran I, who reigned for 32 years and died in his 61st year (at age 60).) |

== Bibliography ==
- Athwa, Sayadaw (1766). "Slapat des Ragawan der Königsgeschichte". Die äthiopischen Handschriften der K.K. Hofbibliothek zu Wien (in German). 151. Translated by P.W. Schmidt (1906 ed.). Vienna: Alfred Hölder.
- Fernquest, Jon (Autumn 2006). "Crucible of War: Burma and the Ming in the Tai Frontier Zone (1382–1454)". SOAS Bulletin of Burma Research. 4 (2).
- Harvey, G. E. (1925). History of Burma: From the Earliest Times to 10 March 1824. London: Frank Cass & Co. Ltd.
- Kala, U (1724). Maha Yazawin (in Burmese). Vol. 1–3 (2006, 4th printing ed.). Yangon: Ya-Pyei Publishing.
- Maha Sithu (1798). Myint Swe; Kyaw Win; Thein Hlaing (eds.). Yazawin Thit (in Burmese). Vol. 1–3 (2012, 2nd printing ed.). Yangon: Ya-Pyei Publishing.
- Pan Hla, Nai (1968). Razadarit Ayedawbon (in Burmese) (8th printing, 2005 ed.). Yangon: Armanthit Sarpay.
- Phayre, Lt. Gen. Sir Arthur P. (1883). History of Burma (1967 ed.). London: Susil Gupta.
- Royal Historical Commission of Burma (1832). Hmannan Yazawin (in Burmese). Vol. 1–3 (2003 ed.). Yangon: Ministry of Information, Myanmar.
- Shwe Naw, ed. (1785). Mon Yazawin (Shwe Naw) (in Burmese). Translated by Shwe Naw (1922 ed.). Yangon: Burma Publishing Workers Association Press.
- Than Tun (1985). The Royal Orders of Burma, A.D. 1598–1885. Vol. 2. Kyoto University. hdl:2433/173789.

Binnya Ran I Hanthawaddy Dynasty Born: c. April 1393 Died: c. September 1446
Regnal titles
| Preceded by Binnya Dhammaraza | King of Hanthawaddy c. 1424–1446 | Succeeded by Binnya Waru |
Royal titles
| Preceded by Binnya Dhammaraza | Heir to the Hanthawaddy Throne c. 1421–1424 | Succeeded by Binnya Waru |
