= Soe Min Wimala Dewi =

Soe Min Wimala Dewi; စိုးမင်း ဝိမလ ဒေဝီ

Queen consort of Pegu
- Tenure: c. February 1431 – c. September 1446
- Born: Pagan (Bagan)
- Died: Pegu (Bago)?
- Spouse: Binnya Ran I
- Issue: Leik Munhtaw
- Father: Thinkhaya of Pagan
- Mother: Saw Min Pu
- Religion: Theravada Buddhism

Soe Min Wimala Dewi (Burmese: စိုးမင်း ဝိမလ ဒေဝီ, pronounced [só mɪ́ɴ wḭməla̰ dèwì]) was a queen consort of King Binnya Ran I of Hanthawaddy. Soe Min was of Ava royalty, and was given to Binnya Ran in a marriage of state in 1431. Her title at Pegu was Thiri Pawara Maha Dhamma Yaza Dewi (Pali: Siripavaramahādhammarājadevī). She was the mother of King Leik Munhtaw of Hanthawaddy.

== Ancestry ==
Soe Min was born to Saw Min Pu and Gov. Thinkhaya of Pagan (Bagan). She was a half cousin as well as niece of King Minkhaung I of Ava (Note: Hmannan (Hmannan Vol. 2 2003: 82) says Thinkhaya of Pagan was the youngest paternal uncle of King Minkhaung I. But Thinkhaya could not have been a full paternal uncle since Minkhaung's father Swa Saw Ke did not have any full younger brothers. It means Thinkhaya was born to a junior wife of Min Shin Saw of Thayet. Moreover (Hmannan Vol. 2 2003: 74) says she was also a niece of Minkhaung I.) although she was about four decades younger. Her eldest sibling Saw Shwe Khet was viceroy of Prome (Pyay). Her younger sister Atula Thiri Maha Yaza Dewi was the chief queen of King Narapati I of Ava.

Ancestry of Queen Soe Min Wimala Dewi

8. Kyawswa of Pagan
4. Min Shin Saw of Thayet?
9. Saw Soe of Pagan
2. Thinkhaya of Pagan
10. unnamed
5. unnamed
11. unnamed
1. Soe Min
12. Min Letwe of Sikyay
6. Thinkhaya of Wadi
13. unnamed
3. Saw Min Pu
14. Yandathu II of Lanbu
7. Saw Pale of Wadi
15. Saw Chit-Ke

== Bibliography ==
- Royal Historical Commission of Burma (2003) [1832]. Hmannan Yazawin (in Burmese). Vol. 1–3. Yangon: Ministry of Information, Myanmar.
