= Percy Furnivall =

British cardiac surgeon

Percy Furnivall FRCS
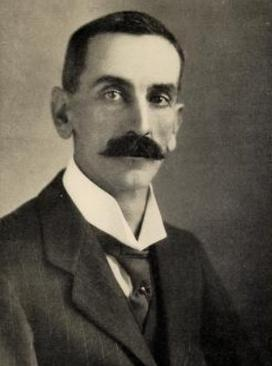
- Born: 5 April 1868; London
- Died: 3 May 1938 (aged 70); Northam, Devon
- Education: University College School
- Known for: Cycling; Heart surgery
- Medical career
- Profession: Physician
- Field: Surgeon
- Sub-specialties: Colorectal surgery

Percy Furnivall FRCS (5 April 1868 – 3 May 1938) was a British colorectal surgeon who was a champion cyclist in the 1880s and wrote an early book on athletic performance, Physical Training for High Speed Competitions, that was published in 1888.

He was Hunterian professor of pathology and surgery, assistant surgeon to the Metropolitan Hospital, surgeon to St Mark's Hospital for Diseases of the Rectum and assistant surgeon to the London Hospital. In 1903 he operated on John Long to repair a knife wound to the chest in what has been described as the first known case of heart surgery in Britain.

He retired early due to ill-health and died of throat cancer in 1938 having prompted a debate in the columns of the British Medical Journal about the merits of surgery compared to X-rays and radium in the treatment of cancer.

== Early life and family ==
Percy Furnivall was born in London on 5 April 1868 to Frederick James Furnivall and Eleanor Nickel Dalziel. A sister, Ena, died in infancy. His father lost his inherited wealth in the failure of the Overend and Gurney bank in 1867 and thereafter lived on what he could make by writing. He was the second editor of the Oxford English Dictionary.

Percy married Olive Mary Butlin, the eldest daughter of Sir Henry Trentham Butlin, with whom he had three daughters.

== Cycling ==
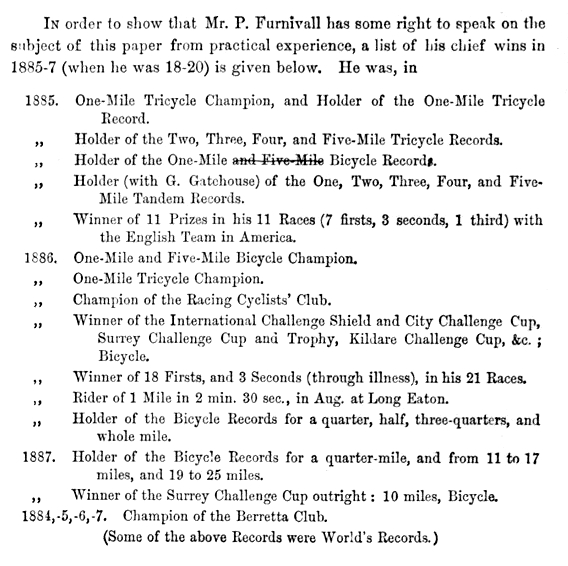
List of Percy Furnivall's race results

Furnivall was a champion amateur bicyclist, tricyclist, and tandemist in the 1880s and won 11 prizes during a tour of the United States. In 1886 he was the champion one and five-mile bicyclist, and in 1887 was the record-holder for the quarter-mile bicycle race. He wrote an early book on athletic performance, Physical Training for High Speed Competitions, that was published in 1888.

In addition to diet recommendations for the cyclist, Furnivall advised abstention from alcohol and tobacco, and streamlined clothing designed "not to catch the wind, and yet to leave all the joints free play". He also warned the cyclist never to forget "that you are a sportsman and a gentleman."

An acrostic titled "Lays of the Track. XI Ye Champion" by F.F.S. appeared in The Bicycling News in 1886 as follows:

P eerless he stands, our Champion of the wheel,
E xcelling all who ride the 'steed of steel';
R ich in the qualities that make a man,
C areful to act on honour's noble plan;
Y ielding to none who dare the [mimic] fight,

F amed for his worth, and matchless in his might.
U pon that name, that cyclers proudly hail,
R ests no unworthy stain, no blot to pale,
N o flaw to dim the lustre, or to shade;
I ts lasting glory, Time will never fade.
V ictor and modest-combination rare!-
A sportsman thorough-aye, without compare:
L ong may he claim the wheelman's pride of place,
L ong skim the path his sterling merits grace!

== Surgical career ==
After attending University College School, he took up a post as house surgeon at St Bartholomew's Hospital and became an anatomy demonstrator.

His essay "The pathology, diagnosis, and treatment of the various neoplasms met with in the stomach, small intestine, caecum, and colon", won him the 1897 Jacksonian prize and in 1901 he chose the subject "Neoplasms of the stomach and intestine" when he was appointed Hunterian professor of pathology and surgery. He became assistant surgeon to the Metropolitan Hospital, was also elected surgeon to St Mark's Hospital for Diseases of the Rectum and in January 1899 he was made assistant surgeon to the London Hospital.

In 2019, findings from Furnivall's surgical logbook were presented in a public lecture at the Worshipful Society of Apothecaries. Included was the case of John Long who had a knife wound to the chest repaired in 1903, the first known case of heart surgery in Britain. He has been described as "Britain's first heart surgeon".

== Description ==
Furnivall was described by Henry Souttar in an obituary for the British Medical Journal as a "tall gaunt figure in a great fur coat, smoking an enormous cigar, stepping out from one of the earliest of motor cars" while Plarr's Lives of the Fellows commented that he was "outspoken and somewhat caustic in his remarks" but not tactless.

== Illness and death ==
In 1919, Furnivall took early retirement due to ill-health and subsequently moved to Northam in North Devon.

He was diagnosed with throat cancer in 1937 and as a result received treatment using x-rays and radium. In February 1938 he wrote to the British Medical Journal to describe his own experiences of his treatment, saying "I would not wish my worst enemy the prolonged hell I have been through with radium neuritis and myalgia for over six months." His correspondence prompted a debate in the columns of the journal that reflected the wider debate in the medical community between those who favoured the new treatments for cancer of radium and x-rays and those that favoured the traditional treatment of surgery which they saw as having fewer injurious side-effects. He died on 3 May 1938.

== Selected publications ==
- Physical Training for High Speed Competitions. Chatto & Windus, London, 1888.
- Vicary, Thomas. The Anatomie of the Bodie of Man. N. Trübner & Co., London, 1888. (edited with F. J. Furnivall)
- "On Certain Affections of the Nervous System in Cyclists", The Lancet, Vol. 149, No. 3848 (29 May 1897). doi:10.1016/S0140-6736(01)95191-8
