= Mwei Thin =

Dala Thuddhamaya Mwei Thin ဒလ သုဒ္ဓမာယာ မွေ့သင်

Queen of Hanthawaddy
- Tenure: 5 January 1384 – c. December 1421
- Born: c. 1360s Nagada village
- Died: Unknown; Pegu (Bago)?
- Spouse: Razadarit (1383–1421)
- Issue: Binnya Ran I Shin Sawbu
- House: Hanthawaddy Pegu
- Religion: Theravada Buddhism

Dala Thuddhamaya Mwei Thin (Burmese: ဒလ သုဒ္ဓမာယာ မွေ့သင်, pronounced [dəla̰ θouʔda̰ màjà mwḛ θɪ̀ɴ]; also spelled Tala Thuddhamaya (တလ သုဒ္ဓမာယာ, Pali: Tala Suddhamāyā) was a junior queen consort of King Razadarit of Hanthawaddy. She was also the mother of King Binnya Ran I and Queen Regnant Shin Sawbu.

== Brief ==
According to the Razadarit Ayedawbon chronicle, she was a commoner named Mwei Thin from the Nagada village near Dagon (modern Yangon). In 1383, she became a wife of Prince Binnya Nwe, who was raising a rebellion against his ailing father King Binnya U. On 2 January 1384, King Binnya U died. Two days later, the court accepted the rebel son Nwe as the successor. Nwe took the title of Razadarit. Mwei Thin became a junior queen with the title of Dala Thuddhamaya on 5 January 1384 at Razadarit's first coronation ceremony. (Note: The chronicle Razadarit Ayedawbon (Pan Hla 2005: 158) says she became queen on Tuesday, 1st waxing of Tabodwe 745 ME, which translates to Thursday, 24 December 1383. But 1st waxing is a typographical error. The editor and historian Pan Hla (Pan Hla 2005: 358, footnote 1) of the chronicle states that Razadarit became king on Monday, 12th waxing of Tabodwe 745 ME (Monday, 4 Jan 1384). It means she became queen on Tuesday, 13th waxing of Tabodwe 745 ME (5 Jan 1384).) They had a son, Binnya Ran I (r. 1424–46), and a daughter, Shin Sawbu (r. 1454–71), both of whom became monarchs of Hanthawaddy.

== Lagun Ein episode ==
The queen reportedly was a dashing beauty. The chronicle Razadarit Ayedawbon reports that she was the reason why Commander Lagun Ein failed to report for duty, right before he was to lead a naval campaign. It was in the dry season of 1389–1390, and Razadarit was in the Irrawaddy Delta with his army and navy to defeat the forces of Lord Laukpya of Myaungmya. Thuddhamaya had accompanied the king to the front. The story goes that the day before the planned naval campaign on Bassein (Pathein), Razadarit sent Thuddhamaya to Lagun Ein's quarters to give his commander a special golden lacquerware box of betel nuts. The next morning, Lagun Ein failed to show up for duty. When his two superiors, Byat Za and Dein Mani-Yut, went over to inquire, the straight-talking commander confessed that he saw a glimpse of the queen's bosoms through her loose garments when she came by his quarters yesterday, and that he had not been able to focus on anything else since. His superiors warned that lusting after the king's wives was grounds for treason, but Lagun Ein was unmoved.

The two ministers reluctantly reported the situation to the king. Razadarit ultimately decided that he needed Lagun Ein, and ordered Thuddhamaya to be sent over in a golden royal litter. A weeping Thuddhamaya begged the king to reconsider but he would not. By the time the litter arrived at Lagun Ein's quarters, the commander had sufficiently recovered his senses, and refused to take the queen. He went on to lead the dangerous naval mission that required his flotilla to lure numerically superior Bassein war boats back to where Razadarit's forces had set up a trap. The mission was successful.

== Bibliography ==
- Fernquest, Jon (Spring 2006). "Rajadhirat's Mask of Command: Military Leadership in Burma (c. 1348–1421)" (PDF). SBBR. 4 (1).
- Pan Hla, Nai (1968). Razadarit Ayedawbon (in Burmese) (8th printing, 2005 ed.). Yangon: Armanthit Sarpay.

Mwei Thin Hanthawaddy Dynasty Born: c. 1360s Died: ?
Royal titles
| Preceded by | Queen of Hanthawaddy; 5 January 1384 – c. December 1421 | Succeeded by |
