= Dhammazedi =

Dhammazedi ဓမ္မစေတီ
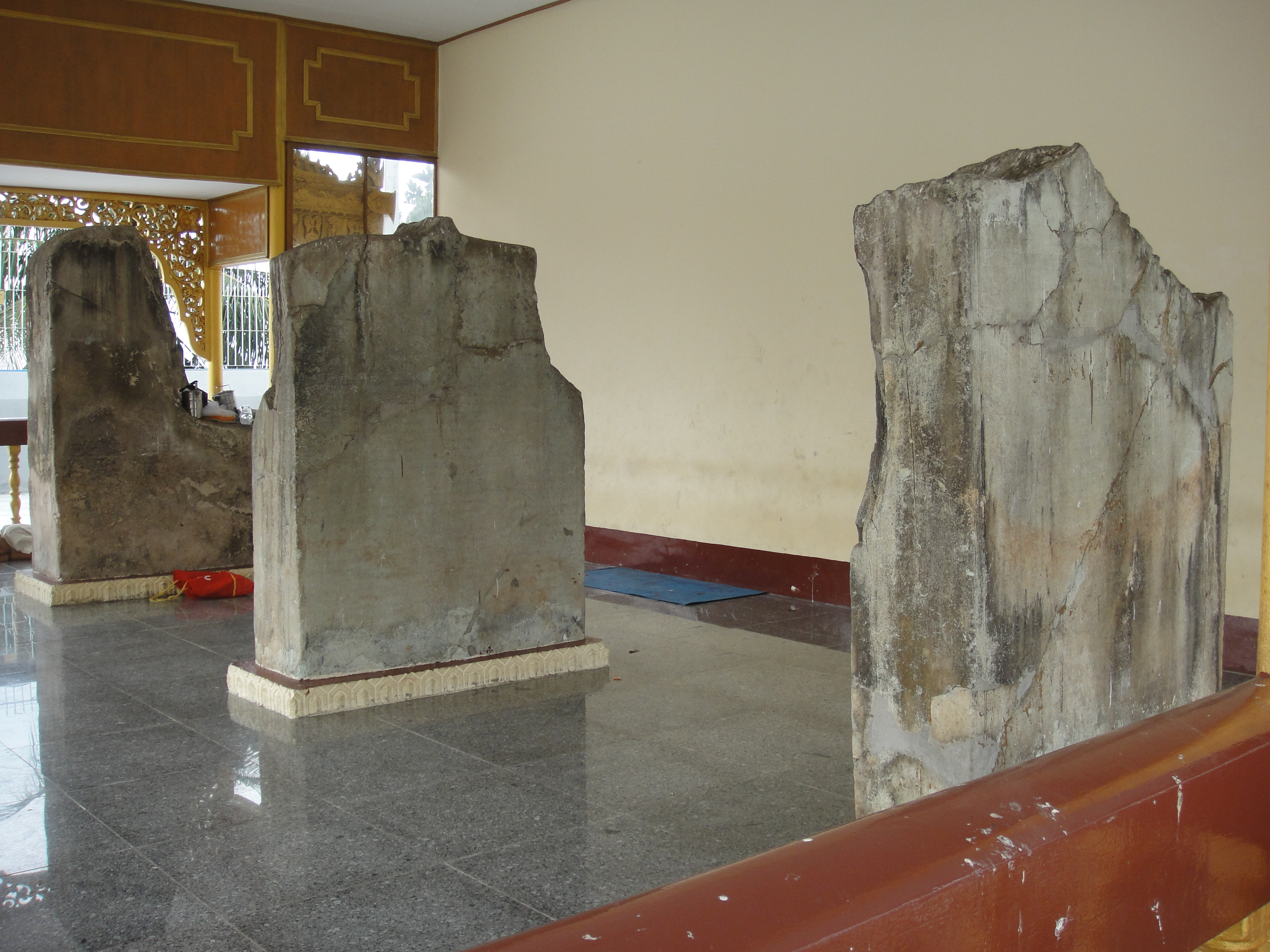
- Dhammazedi Inscriptions Shwedagon Pagoda, Yangon

King of Hanthawaddy
- Reign: 1471–1492
- Predecessor: Shin Sawbu
- Successor: Binnya Ran II

Regent of Hanthawaddy
- Regency: 1460–1471
- Monarch: Shin Sawbu
- Born: November/December 1409; Monday, 771 ME
- Died: 1492; Pegu
- Consort: Mi Pakahtaw
- Issue: Binnya Ran II
- Religion: Theravada Buddhism

Dhammazedi (Burmese: ဓမ္မစေတီ, pronounced [dəma̰zèdì], Pali: Dhammacetiya; c. 1409–1492, reigned 1471 to 1492), also called Dhammaceti the Wise, was the 16th king of the Hanthawaddy Kingdom in Burma. Considered one of the most enlightened rulers in Burmese history, by some accounts call him "the greatest" all Hanthawaddy kings. The former Buddhist monk, educated in the rival kingdom of Ava in his youth, was a trusted adviser and son-in-law of Queen Shin Sawbu. At age 48, he left the monkhood after he was selected by Shin Sawbu as the heir apparent, and was married to one of the queen's daughters. He immediately became the de facto ruler of the kingdom as Shin Sawbu handed over all administrative duties to him.

During Dhammazedi's long reign, the Mon-speaking kingdom reached the peak of its golden age. Under his wise rule, the kingdom, unlike the rival Ava Kingdom, was peaceful, and profited greatly from foreign commerce. His reign was a time of peace and he himself was a mild ruler, famous for his wisdom. A collection of his rulings, Dhammazedi Phyat-htome (ဓမ္မစေတီဖြတ်ထုံး) survives. The kingdom also became a famous center of Theravada Buddhism, with strong ties to Ceylon, and resumed the practice of sending missions to Buddhagaya. His religious reforms later spread throughout the country. He maintained friendly relations with Yunnan.

According to DGE Hall, "He was a Buddhist ruler of the best type, deeply solicitous for the purification of religion. Under him civilization flourished, and the condition of the Mon country stands out in sharp contrast with the disorder and savagery which characterized the Ava kingdom."

He died in 1492. He was honored as a saint and a pagoda was erected over his bones. He was succeeded by his eldest son Binnya Ran II.

== Historiography ==
Various Burmese chronicles report different dates for the key events of his life.

Chronicles	Birth–Death	Age	Reign	Length of reign	Reference
Maha Yazawin and Hmannan Yazawin	not reported	not reported	1470/71–1491/92	21	(Note: (Maha Yazawin Vol. 2 2006: 140) and (Hmannan Vol. 2 2003: 185))
Slapat Rajawan	c. 1420–1491/92	71	1470/71–1491/92	21	
Mon Yazawin (Shwe Naw)	c. 1417–1491/92 and c. November 1409 – 1491/92	74 and ~82	1470/71–1491/92	27 [sic]	(Note: The chronicle is inconsistent. (Shwe Naw 1922: 96) says he reigned for 27 years, and died in his 75th year (at age 74). But the reign period inferred from its own reporting gives about 21 years: (Shwe Naw 1922: 69) says his predecessor Shin Sawbu died in 832 ME (1470/71) and his successor Binnya Ran II died in 888 ME (1526/27) after a reign of 35 years, meaning Ran came to power in 853 ME (1491/92). (Shwe Naw 1922: 96): He was born in 771 ME in the season of Byeissa (ဗြိစ္ဆာ), which corresponds to Scorpio, implying that he was born around November/December of 1409. But that is in conflict with the chronicle's own reported age of 74 at death in 1491/92.)

== Commemorations ==
- Dhammazedi Road, a road in Yangon.

== See also ==
- Great Bell of Dhammazedi
- Kalyani Inscriptions

== Bibliography ==
- Athwa, Sayadaw (1766). "Slapat des Ragawan der Königsgeschichte". Die äthiopischen Handschriften der K.K. Hofbibliothek zu Wien (in German). 151. Translated by P.W. Schmidt (1906 ed.). Vienna: Alfred Hölder.
- Hall, D.G.E. (1960). Burma (3rd ed.). Hutchinson University Library. ISBN 978-1-4067-3503-1.
- Harvey, G. E. (1925). History of Burma: From the Earliest Times to 10 March 1824. London: Frank Cass & Co. Ltd.
- Kala, U (1724). Maha Yazawin (in Burmese). Vol. 1–3 (2006, 4th printing ed.). Yangon: Ya-Pyei Publishing.
- Myint-U, Thant (2006). The River of Lost Footsteps—Histories of Burma. Farrar, Straus and Giroux. ISBN 978-0-374-16342-6.
- Pranke, P. A. (2004). The" Treatise on the Lineage of Elders"(Vamsadipani): Monastic reform and the writing of Buddhist history in eighteenth-century Burma. (Doctoral Dissertation) University of Michigan.
- Royal Historical Commission of Burma (1832). Hmannan Yazawin (in Burmese). Vol. 1–3 (2003 ed.). Yangon: Ministry of Information, Myanmar.
- Shwe Naw, ed. (1785). Mon Yazawin (Shwe Naw) (in Burmese). Translated by Shwe Naw (1922 ed.). Yangon: Burma Publishing Workers Association Press.

Dhammazedi Hanthawaddy Dynasty Born: 1409 Died: 1492
Regnal titles
Preceded by Shin Sawbu	King of Hanthawaddy; 1471–1492	Succeeded by Binnya Ran II
Royal titles
Preceded by Binnya Waru	Heir to the Hanthawaddy Throne; 1458–1471	Succeeded by Binnya Ran II
