= Women in Madagascar =

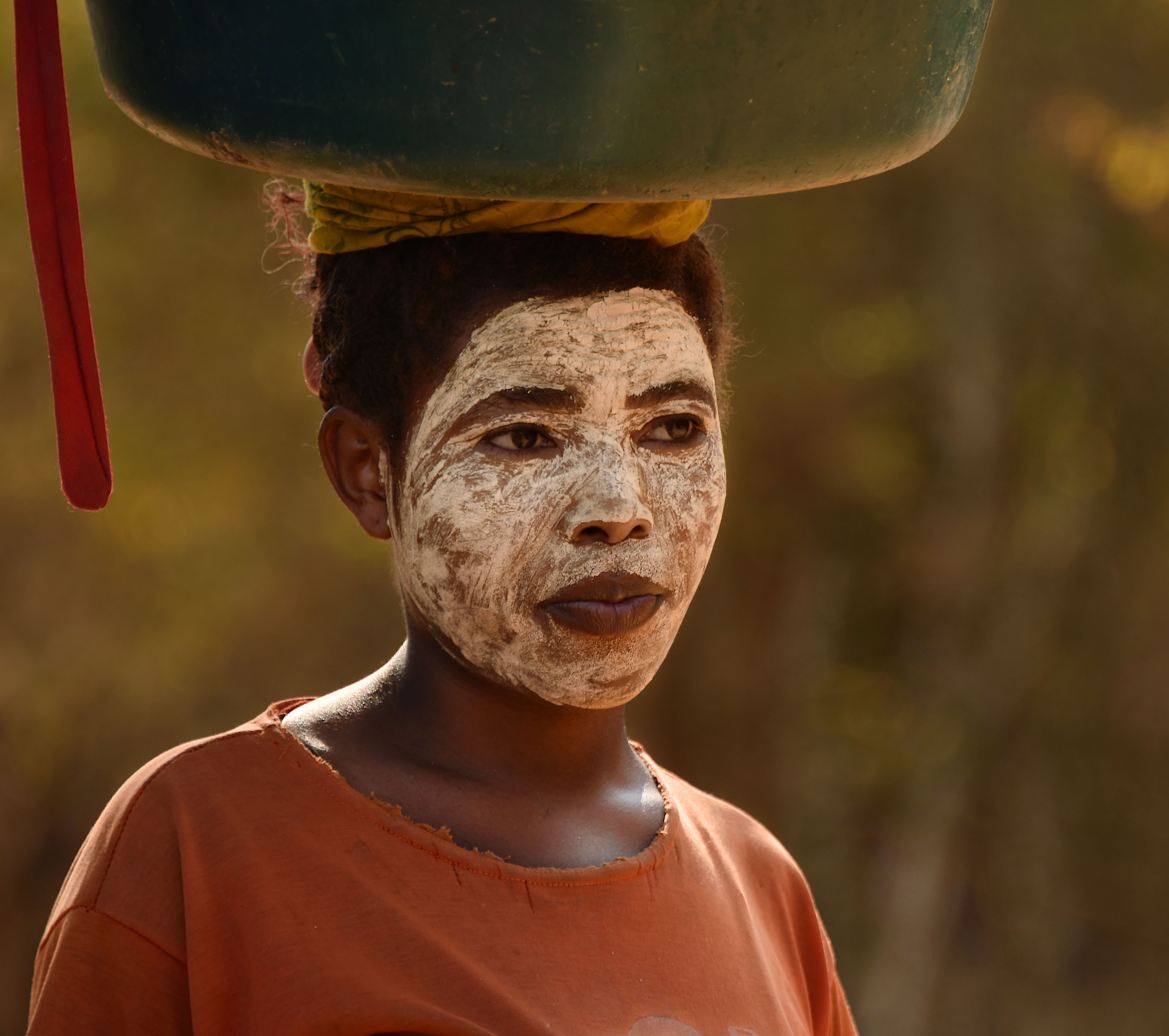
- A Malagasy woman wearing masonjoany and head-carrying

General statistics
- Maternal mortality (per 100,000): 240 (2010)
- Women in parliament: 15.9% (2012)
- Women over 25 with secondary education: NA
- Women in labour force: 83.4% (2011)

Gender Inequality Index
- Value: 0.556 (2021)
- Rank: 143rd out of 191

Global Gender Gap Index
- Value: 0.735 (2022)
- Rank: 48th out of 146

Women in Madagascar generally live longer than men, whom they outnumber. Marrying young, they are traditionally subservient to their husbands. Roughly a third have their first child before the age of 19, and those who wish to delay having children may not have access to contraceptives. Although it is illegal with no exceptions, abortion is common, with an estimated 24 percent of women having had one. While they are constitutionally equal to men, they have unequal property rights and employment opportunities in certain areas.

== Health ==
Malagasy women have a higher life expectancy than men, with an average of 61.3 years compared to 57.7 for men in 2010. There are more women than men; women represent 50.3 percent of the country's 2010 population of 19,669,953.

Anemia is prevalent in Malagasy women, with 36 percent suffering from it in some form, mostly mild. The prevalence has decreased in recent years. The prevalence of HIV/AIDS in Madagascar is lower than the average for Africa, with the national rate estimated at 1 percent. Pregnant women had low rates; however, the rates of other sexually transmitted diseases, especially syphilis, are high.

== Family life ==
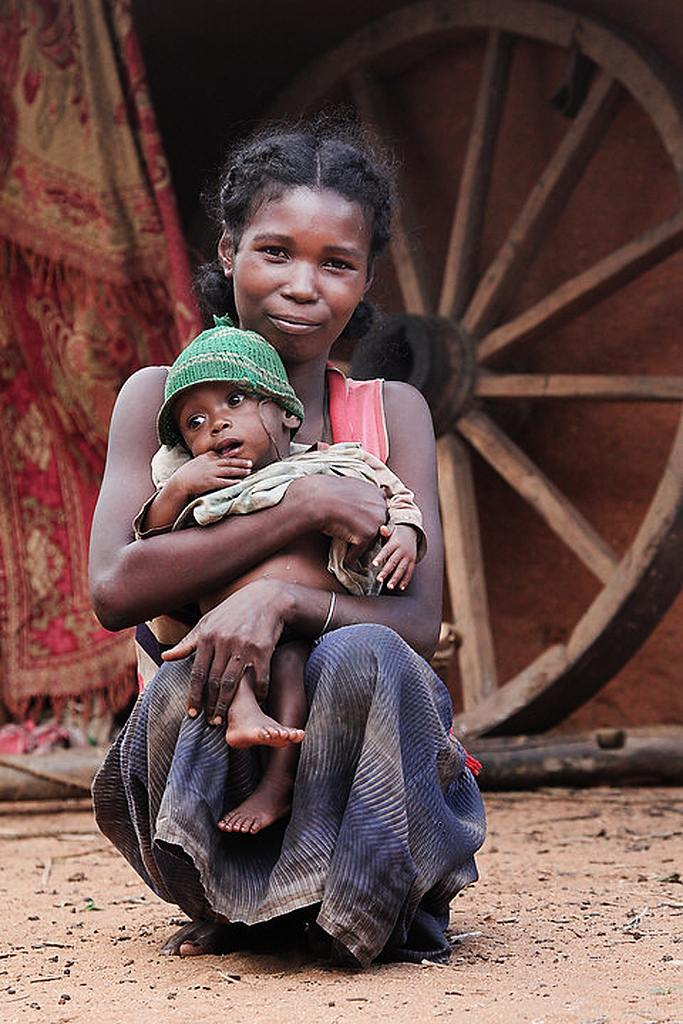
A Malagasy woman with her child

Malagasy law requires women to be 14 years of age before they are married, lower than the minimum age for males. Before the age of 18, only parental consent is required for a woman to be married, while women over the age of 18 must give their own consent. According to the United Nations, of women between the ages 15 and 19, 34 percent had already been married. Polygamy is forbidden, although it still happens. The culture is traditionally patriarchal.

== Fertility ==
Although the total fertility rate in Madagascar is experiencing a decrease, the large number of women of child-bearing age has ensured that population momentum will cause the total number of births to increase. This effect is expected to have subsided within 30 years. Approximately a third of Malagasy women under the age 19 have already had at least one child, and most breastfeed, with 51 percent breastfeeding exclusively for six months.

Although Malagasy women have increasingly begun to use contraceptives, both oral and injected, use remains low; only 1.5 percent of women use implanted contraceptives. The abortion rate is estimated at 1 in 10, with 24 percent of women having undergone an abortion. Fifteen percent of married women wishing to use contraceptives have no access to family planning initiatives. In the majority of cases a woman's husband entirely or partially decides what actions should be taken. There is a minority opinion (held by 9 percent of women and 8 percent of men) that a husband may beat his wife if she refuses sex.

The effect of education has been seen in Madagascar's infant mortality rate. According to Maryanne Sharp and Ioana Kruse of the World Bank, mothers who have finished their secondary education experience fewer than forty to fifty percent of the infant deaths experienced by women with less education. Younger women are also less likely to have babies who die while young. The average perinatal mortality rate has decreased since 2003.

The maternal death figure for Madagascar is lower than average in Sub-Saharan Africa, at a total of 498 deaths per 100,000 live births. This death rate remained stable between 2000 and 2009. This figure has been influenced by numerous factors. Although 86 percent receive pre-natal checkups, 49 percent of them are not told if there are complications. Approximately 46 percent of new mothers receive fewer than four post-natal care sessions. Most women give birth outside of health centres, and the number of those who had assistance in giving birth is decreasing; according to Sharp and Kruse, 35 percent of Malagasy women who give birth outside of health centres do not receive medical care. Abortions due to unwanted pregnancies are also a major contributor.

== Economy ==
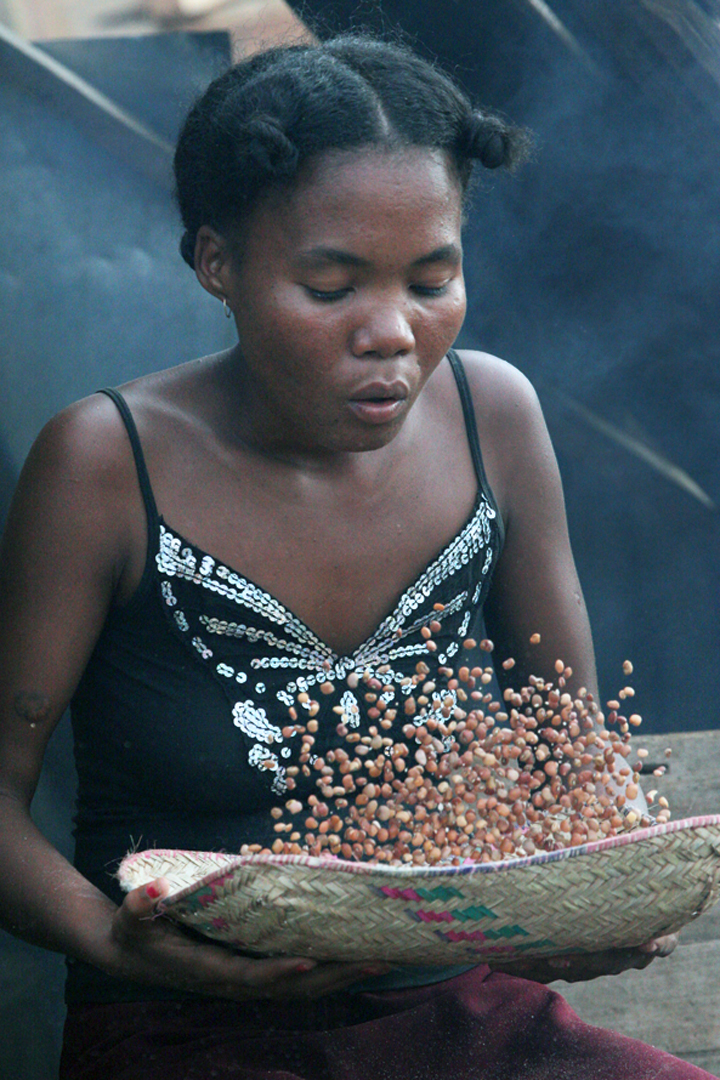
A Malagasy woman preparing peanuts

Rich and middle-class Malagasy women spend much time cooking, and may work in cassava, rice, and maize production. Poorer women often work in rice production together with male family members, although they most commonly work with dry-field crops. Outside of the harvesting season, they may produce and sell other items to earn income for their families.

Malagasy women participate in sharecropping. Some, including divorced, land-owning women without adequate male support, contract out the labour to relatives or other members of the community, while others may work sharecropped lands with their husbands; however, female sharecroppers are rarely counted separately from their husbands.

== Gender equality ==
Discrimination based on gender is forbidden by the Constitution of Madagascar. In practice, the Organisation for Economic Co-operation and Development (OECD) observes that there are still reports of discrimination in inheritance law. The OECD has rated the degree of gender discrimination as medium on the Social Institutions and Gender Index.

Women legally have equal ownership rights, although in locations along the east coast of Madagascar they may be unable to own land. They are allowed to own their own businesses and do not require permission from their husband to acquire land. Their civil liberties are generally well-respected; however, in cases of spousal abuse, women must report the crime themselves in order for the police to act. Although calling the police is rare, women also have a traditional right known as misintaka that allows them to leave their husbands and live with their families.

There is a perception that women in Madagascar should focus on cooking, with farming handled by the men. As such, poorer Malagasy women are not allowed to assist in the farming on other people's land. In a divorce, Malagasy women traditionally receive a third of the property acquired during their marriage, with their husband receiving the remaining two-thirds; they may also choose to keep their property separate during marriage. When the husband dies, a Malagasy widow who has borne a child receives half of the joint property; however, if the couple was childless then the husband's family received most of the inheritance.

== See also ==
- Women in Africa

== Bibliography ==
- Jarosz, Lucy (1997). "Women as Rice Sharecroppers in Madagascar". In Carolyn E., Sachs (ed.). Women Working in the Environment. Washington, D.C.: Taylor & Francis. ISBN 978-1-56032-629-8.
- OECD (2010). Atlas of Gender and Development : How Social Norms Affect Gender Equality in non-OECD Countries. Paris: Organisation for Economic Co-operation and Development. Development Centre. ISBN 978-92-64-07520-7.
- Sharp, Maryanne; Kruse, Ioana (2011). Health, Nutrition, and Population in Madagascar 2000-09. Washington, D.C.: World Bank. ISBN 978-0-8213-8538-8.
