= Ma Aung Phyu =

Burmese nat spirit

"Phya-Leik Nat" Ma Aung Phyu (Burmese: ဖျာလိပ်နတ် မအောင်ဖြူ, pronounced [pʰjà leiʔ naʔ maʔ ʔàuɰ̃ bjù], lit. 'Rolled Up Mat Spirit Ma Aung Phyu') is a Burmese nat spirit. She is mainly venerated by women, who consult her on matters concerning marriage and/or future partners.

== Legend ==
According to legend, Ma Aung Phyu was the daughter of a village chief in the territory ruled by Kyaswa of Prome (Pyay). She was married to Pyinnya Bala, an official and the nephew of Thone Myo Shin, the ruler of the nearby Tharrawaddy region. Although Pyinnya Bala had initially agreed to marry the daughter of a count, he chose the village chief's daughter instead. This decision shamed the count, and started a feud between the two. The count subsequently accused Pyinnya Bala of plotting to seize power, leading Thone Myo Shin to order Pyinnya Bala's arrest.

Following the arrest, Aung Phyu traveled to visit her husband, carrying only cooking pots and a rolled up mat. However, her journey was cut short when town officials intercepted her. At the time, the construction of the Tharawaddy town pillar had failed repeatedly, and astrologers had prophesied that a specific sacrifice was required to stabilize the foundation. Aung Phyu, a Sunday-born woman with "Aung" in her name, fit the description perfectly. She was seized and buried alive in the foundation pit as a human sacrifice.

Before her death, Aung Phyu reportedly cursed the Tharawaddy region: "May the town's animals be vicious, its people wicked, and its land devoid of prosperity". Furthermore, she prayed for a reunion with her husband. After her death, Aung Phyu became an ogress. Using her supernatural powers, she rescued her husband from prison, and brought him to her domain. They lived together there and had a son, Maung Me Khaung, who possessed extraordinary strength.

One day, while the ogress was out gathering fruit, their son fled with his father on his back. When she realized they had escaped, she pursued them to the boundary of her domain but was unable to cross the boundary. She remained at the border wailing for their return until she died of a broken heart.

After her life as an ogress, her spirit remained fixated on memories of her human life, specifically the rolled up mat she carried on the day of her arrest. Because of this deep attachment, she became known as the spirit Phya-Leik Nat (the Rolled Up Mat Spirit).

== Worship ==
Women typically consult the Ma Aung Phyu nat spirit regarding desired romantic unions. Due to her deep resentment toward her husband and son, men are strictly forbidden from participating in Ma Aung Phyu offering ceremonies.

The offering ritual requires a kadaw pwe (offering tray) containing coconuts and bananas. A new rolled up mat is stood upright in front of the offering tray. The mat is dressed in female attire, including a htamein (sarong), a blouse, false hair, and a comb. Additionally, a kyauk pyin (thanaka bark grinding stone) and a mirror are placed nearby for her use.

== Traditional practice ==
A traditional practice once observed among Burmese girls involved a form of folk divination performed when they were alone at home. A mat was rolled up, dressed in a blouse and htamein, and symbolically invited to be possessed by the Phya-leik nat. Participants asked questions, often about romantic matters, such as the future location of a prospective partner. The mat was then shaken, and the direction in which it fell was taken as the answer. Similar divination practices are found in many cultures, and use different objects, including mats, coins, or wooden boards.
