= Mandala Myint =

Burmese classical singer

- မန္တလာမြင့်
- Born: 16 March 1910; Mandalay, British Burma
- Died: 3 May 1990 (aged 80); Mandalay, Myanmar
- Occupation: Singer

Mandala Myint (Burmese: မန္တလာမြင့်; also spelt Mandalar Myint) was a prominent Burmese classical singer, best known for her rendition of "Shwebo Thanakha" (ရွှေဘိုသနပ်ခါး), composed by Nandawshe Saya Tin. She was born Ma Ngwe on 16 March 1910 to parents U Hmyin and Daw Hsin, the third of five children, in Mandalay, British Burma. She became blind at a young age. Throughout her career, she was ascribed to over 21 songs.

She never married, and lived with her nephews and nieces. She died on 3 May 1990 in Mandalay.
