= Kyaswa (disambiguation) =

Kyaswa was a Burmese royal title.

It may mean:

- Kyaswa: King of Pagan (r. 1235−51)
- Kyaswa of Sagaing: King of Sagaing (r. 1339−49)
- Kyaswa of Prome: Viceroy of Prome (r. c. 1305−44)
