= Thone Myo Shin =

Burmese nat spirit

Thone Myo Shin (Burmese: သုံးမြို့ရှင်; lit. 'Lord of the Three Towns') is a Burmese nat spirit primarily venerated by cockfighting gamblers and enthusiasts.

== Legend ==
According to legend, Thone Myo Shin was the ruler of Tharawaddy. Although his title translates to 'Lord of the Three Towns', the legend does not identify the other two towns. His nephew Pyinnya Bala served as a minister in his administration. He also had a niece named Ma Min Hla. The Shwesandaw Pagoda tradition identifies Thone Myo Shin was "king" of Tharrawaddy with the title of Thado Nawrahta, and was a contemporary of "King" Kyaswa of Prome (Pyay). (According to the royal chronicles, Kyaswa was governor of Pyay during the late Pagan and Myinsaing–Pinya periods.)

One day, Thone Myo Shin accused Pyinnya Bala of plotting to seize power, and arrested him. The ruler then attempted to take Min Hla as his consort. She refused and committed suicide by holding her breath. After her death, she became the nat spirit Thonbanhla. Thone Myo Shin also executed Pyinnya Bala's wife, Ma Aung Phyu. She was buried alive as a foundation sacrifice to fulfill a prophecy requiring a woman named 'Aung' for the town's stability.

After her death, Aung Phyu reportedly became an ogress, and used her supernatural powers to rescue her husband from prison. Years later, their son Maung Me Khaung and Pyinnya Bala returned to Tharrawaddy to join the administration. Me Khaung quickly became known for his extraordinary strength. After capturing a rampaging wild elephant, he became Thone Myo Shin's main bodyguard and henchman.

Thone Myo Shin was an avid cockfighter. During a trip to a match in Pyay, he arrived late, and was mocked by the lord of Pyay. Humiliated, Thone Myo Shin blamed Me Khaung for failing to prepare the elephant quickly, and kicked him in the face. This insult prompted Me Khaung to rebel. In the ensuing battle, Thone Myo Shin rode the elephant Me Khaung had previously captured. However, when the elephant recognized its former master's voice, and fled, Me Khaung killed Thone Myo Shin with a spear. Following his death, Thone Myo Shin became a nat.

== Worship ==
Cockfighters believe that making offerings to Thone Myo Shin ensures victory. Offerings must not include chicken-related items. A standard offering tray includes three bunches of bananas, three oil lamps, three types of flowers, three betel quids, three portions of tea leaves, and one coconut.

== Bibliography ==
- Kala, U (2006) [1724]. Maha Yazawin (in Burmese). Vol. 1–3 (4th printing ed.). Yangon: Ya-Pyei Publishing.
- Maha Sithu (2012) [1798]. Kyaw Win; Thein Hlaing (eds.). Yazawin Thit (in Burmese). Vol. 1–3 (2nd printing ed.). Yangon: Ya-Pyei Publishing.
- Royal Historical Commission of Burma (2003) [1832]. Hmannan Yazawin (in Burmese). Vol. 1–3. Yangon: Ministry of Information, Myanmar.
