= Masonjoany =

Cosmetic wood paste worn in Madagascar, Comoros, and Mayotte

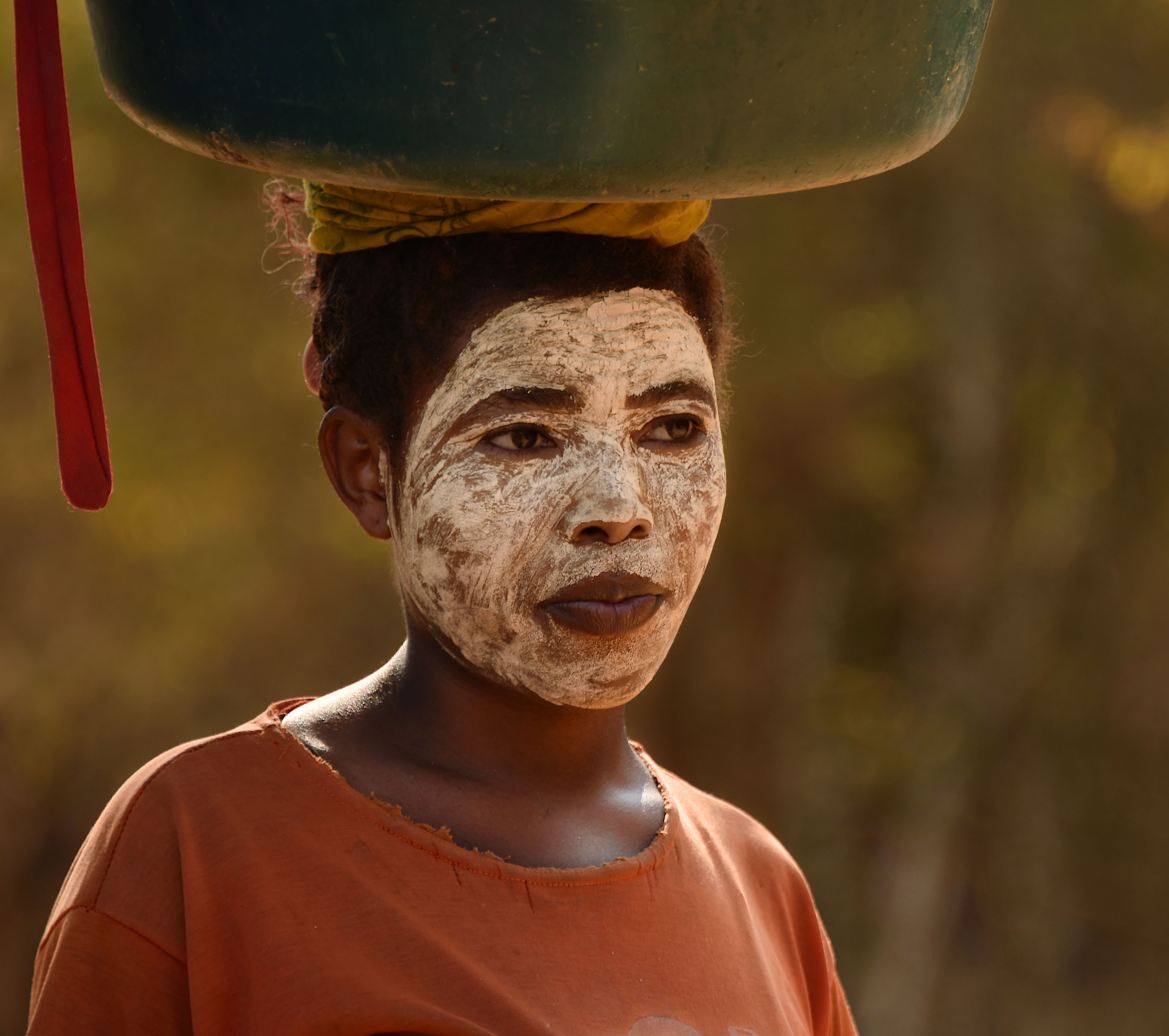
A Malagasy woman wearing protective masonjoany and head-carrying laundry

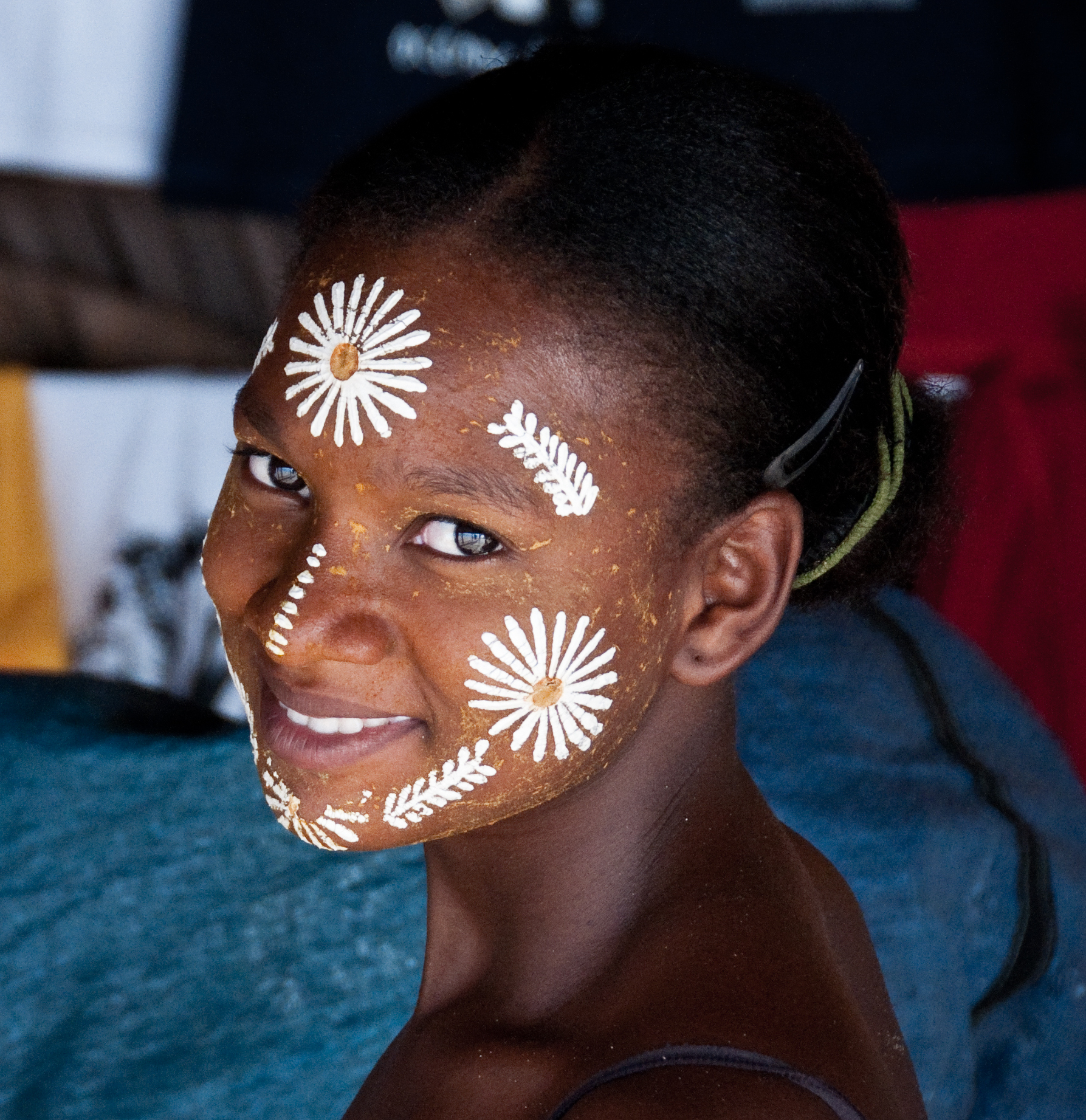
A Malagasy girl in Nosy Be wearing ornamental masonjoany

Masonjoany (Malagasy pronunciation: [masund͡zuanʲ]) (or msindanu or msindzano in Comoros and Mayotte) (Note: Also mosinjàno and msinjàno in the Comoros.) is a cosmetic paste and sunscreen made of ground wood. It is worn as a protective and decorative mask by women and girls in Madagascar, Comoros, and Mayotte. In Madagascar, the paste has yellow and white forms, with yellow masonjoany being derived from the wood of the tabàky or Madagascar sandalwood (Coptosperma madagascarensis), and white masonjoany deriving from the wood of the aviavy or fihamy tree (Ficus grevei). Burasaia madagascariensis is used by communities in Madagascar's Tampolo forest in Fenoarivo Atsinanana. In Comoros, the most commonly used tree for msindzano is Indian sandalwood (Santalum album), producing a "canary yellow" paste. The wood is ground against a surface of ceramic, stone, or coral skeleton, and combined with water and oil to make the paste. The practice in Madagascar originates from cultural exchange in Nosy Be between Malagasy natives and Indian merchants, who first arrived to the island in the 11th century CE.

Masonjoany is both protective and decorative: women wear it as sunscreen and insect repellent, and sometimes paint it in natural and abstract designs with a mix of contrasting white and yellow pastes. Common motifs in decorative masonjoany include flowers, stars, and leaves. Other benefits associated with masonjoany in Madagascar include anti-aging, eliminating skin impurities, and cleansing the skin. Other benefits ascribed in Comoros include the lightening of skin as well as treatment of medical ailments like eczema, acne, and allergies.

A woman in Mahajanga preparing masonjoany for herself on a market wall

Masonjoany in Madagascar is also worn for religious rituals and beauty pageants. Molecular biologist Gianfranco Rasuelo reported that a Malagasy woman he had met on the street had told him that yellow masonjoany was spread on the faces of widows in mourning, but noted that this information is apocryphal. The paste is typical of Madagascar's Northwestern coastal region, particularly by Sakalava and Vezo women in the provinces of Nosy Be, Antsiranana, and Toliara—though it has spread throughout the island and can now be found adorning women's faces as far as the Central Highlands. Sakalava women wear yellow masonjoany when performing the Kahoitry ritual dance. The mask is ubiquitous throughout Mayotte, and is common, though waning in popularity, in Comoros.

== See also ==
- Borak (cosmetic) – Cosmetic for sun protection
- Bornean traditional tattooing – Austronesian ethnic group
- Thanaka – Cosmetic paste made from ground bark, common in Myanmar
- Malu – Type of tattoo
- Otjize – Butterfat-ochre paste worn by Himba
- Peʻa – Traditional male tatau of Samoa
- Rapa Nui tattooing – Tattooing among Rapa Nui people
- Tā moko – Māori facial tattoo
- Veiqia – Female tattoo practice in Fiji
- Culture of Mayotte
- Culture of Madagascar
- Women in Madagascar
