= Borak (cosmetic) =

Cosmetic for sun protection

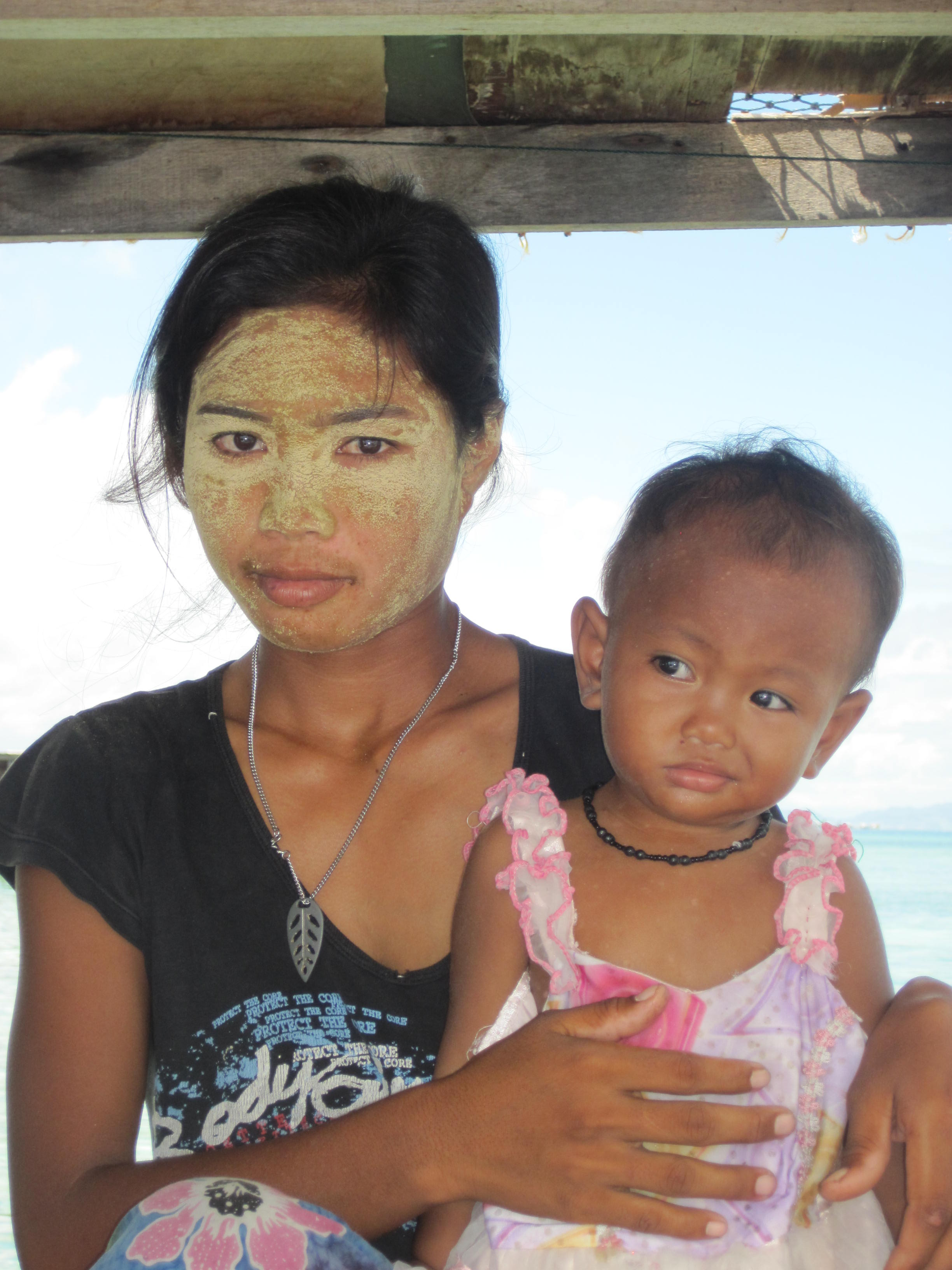
Sama woman from Semporna, Sabah, Malaysia, with borak

Borak or burak is a cosmetic face powder or paste that is applied on the face for protection from the sun. It is traditionally used by the Sama-Bajau people of the Philippines, Malaysia, and Indonesia.

Borak is most commonly used by Sama-Bajau women to protect the face and exposed skin areas from the harsh tropical sun at sea. Ingredients can include talcum powder, rice flour, turmeric, and other ingredients.

When dry, borak is in powder form. The powder is first soaked in water to form a paste before being applied on the face. The paste can be a yellowish color or sometimes white.

== Similar pastes ==
In Myanmar, thanaka, a yellow-white cosmetic paste made of ground tree bark, is traditionally used for sun protection. In Madagascar, a paste of wood called masonjoany is worn for decoration as well as for sun protection.

== See also ==
- Sunscreen
- Masonjoany
- Thanaka
- Lotion
