= Maung Me Khaung =

Legendary Burmese hero

Maung Me Khaung (Burmese: မောင်မဲခေါင်, [màʊɰ̃ mɛ̀ gàʊɰ̃]), also known as Chay-Ya Ta Taung Maung Me Khaung (Burmese: ခြေရာတစ်တောင် မောင်မဲခေါင်, romanized: lit, lit. 'One-Cubit Footprint Maung Me Khaung'), was a legendary Burmese hero renowned for his extraordinary strength.

== Legend ==
According to legend, Maung Me Khaung was the son of the ogress Ma Aung Phyu and Pyinnya Bala, an official under Thone Myo Shin, the ruler of Tharrawaddy. His mother was originally human but became an ogress after being sacrificed during the foundation of the town. She later reunited with her husband in her cave, where Maung Me Khaung was born. As the son of an ogress, Maung Me Khaung grew to an immense size. By adulthood, his footprints measured one full cubit in length, earning him the moniker, 'Chay-Ya Ta Taung Maung Me Khaung' (One-Cubit Footprint Maung Me Khaung). He possessed the strength to capture wild elephants, and snap their tusks with his bare hands. (Some versions of the legend mistakenly use the name, 'Chay-Ya Ta Htaung Maung Me Khaung' (One Thousand Footprints Maung Me Khaung) due to phonetic similarities in the Burmese language.)

Upon reaching adulthood, Maung Me Khaung realized that his mother was not human and chose to join human society. While his mother was out gathering fruit, he fled with his father on his back. His mother died of a broken heart after failing to catch them. In Tharrawaddy, Maung Me Khaung and his father resumed their service to his grand-uncle, Lord Thone Myo Shin. When a massive wild elephant rampaged through the region, only Maung Me Khaung successfully subdued the beast. Pleased, Lord Thone Myo Shin promoted him to military general and royal bodyguard, granting him the title Hatthi Zayya Bala (ဟတ္ထိဇေယျဗလ).

The relationship between the lord and the general deteriorated during a journey to a cockfighting match in Pyay. When they arrived late, the ruler of Pyay mocked Thone Myo Shin for his tardiness. Thone Myo Shin blamed Maung Me Khaung for the delay, and kicked him in the face. Deeply insulted, Maung Me Khaung launched a rebellion. Thone Myo Shin attempted to suppress the uprising while riding the elephant Maung Me Khaung had previously captured. However, the animal panicked at the sound of Maung Me Khaung’s voice and fled. Maung Me Khaung killed the lord with a spear. Following his death, Thone Myo Shin was transformed into a nat (spirit).

== Legacy ==
The premises of the Shwesandaw Pagoda in Pyay contain the Chay-Ya Ta Taung Maung Me Khaung Vow Cave (ခြေရာတစ်တောင် မောင်မဲခေါင် အဓိဋ္ဌာန်ဂူ), which houses replica footprints of Maung Me Khaung. Pagoda records state that the Lord of Tharawaddy and General Maung Me Khaung visited the pagoda in October 1296 (or 1290). (Note: The Shwesandaw pagoda history gives the date as the 10th waxing of Tazaungmon 658 ME (in the sasana year (Buddhist Era) of 1834.) However, 658 ME is equivalent to 1840 BE, not 1834 BE. Thus, the two possible dates are: 10th waxing of Tazaungmon 658 ME (1840 BE) = 7 October 1296; 10th waxing of Tazaungmon 1834 BE (652 ME) = 14 October 1290) After paying homage, Maung Me Khaung made a solemn vow (adhiṭṭhāna): "If I am truly a renowned promoter of the sasana (Buddhist religion), and if my endeavors are to succeed, may my footprints remain impressed upon this very spot." According to legend, two footprints, each about one cubit long, appeared in the solid rock immediately after his vow. Today, the original footprints are covered for protection. In 1950, a cave-like pagoda featuring the cement replicas was constructed over the site. The structure is modeled after the Shwezigon Pagoda of Bagan.
