= Pazzawta of Prome =

Governor of Prome

Pazzawta ပဇ္ဇော်တ

Governor of Prome
- In office c. 1288 – c. 1305
- Monarchs: Kyawswa (1289−97); Athinkhaya, Yazathingyan and Thihathu (1297−1305)
- Preceded by: Thihathu of Prome (as viceroy)
- Succeeded by: Kyaswa

Personal details
- Died: Prome (Pyay)

Pazzawta (Burmese: ပဇ္ဇော်တ, (Note: from Pali "Pajjota") [pəzɔ̀ta̰] or [pɪʔzɔ̀ta̰]) was governor of Prome (Pyay) from c. 1288 to 1305. He was chief minister of Viceroy Thihathu of Prome. According to the Yazawin Thit chronicle, Pazzawta became the de facto governor after Thihathu's death, and was later formally appointed governor by King Kyawswa of Pagan. Main chronicles do not mention him at all. (Note: See (Hmannan Vol. 2 2003: 214) for Hmannan's list of Prome rulers.)

== Bibliography ==
- Maha Sithu (2012) [1798]. Myint Swe; Kyaw Win; Thein Hlaing (eds.). Yazawin Thit (in Burmese). Vol. 1–3 (2nd printing ed.). Yangon: Ya-Pyei Publishing.
- Royal Historical Commission of Burma (2003) [1832]. Hmannan Yazawin (in Burmese). Vol. 1–3. Yangon: Ministry of Information, Myanmar.

Pazzawta of Prome Myinsaing Kingdom
Royal titles
| Preceded by Thihathu as viceroy | Governor of Prome c. 1288 – 1305 | Succeeded by Kyaswa |
