= Abortion in Madagascar =

In Madagascar, abortion is illegal in all circumstances. The abortion law punishes receiving or assisting in an abortion with imprisonment or fines. It is one of the only countries with a total abortion ban. Abortion has been illegal since the French colonial era, influenced by attitudes favoring increased births. In 2017, the government rejected a proposal to legalize therapeutic abortion. A bill allowing abortion in the case of rape was proposed by Member of Parliament Masy Goulamaly in November 2021 but was withdrawn by the parliament.

Most people in Madagascar oppose legalizing abortion. Churches which oppose abortion influence politicians. International organizations have called for the legalization of abortion. The abortion-rights group Nifin'Akanga leads research and protests. Abortions in Madagascar are unsafe and are a major cause of maternal death. Some abortions are performed clandestinely by medical professionals. Some women self-induce abortions or seek traditional remedies from traditional midwives. Madagascar has low use of contraception.

== Legislation ==
Article 317 of the penal code of Madagascar says women who receive abortions can be punished by 6 months to 2 years of prison or a fine of 2 million ariary. It sentences people who assist in an abortion to 1-5 years of prison and a fine of 360,000 to 10.8 million ariary (€80 to €2,500 in 2022), or higher for repeat offenders. As of 2020, Madagascar is one of thirteen countries that completely bans abortion. Post-abortion care is legal.

According to a 2022 survey by Afrobarometer, 96% of Malagasy people oppose the legalization of on-demand abortion, and 85% in the case of rape. However, 65% approve of abortion if the pregnancy is risky. The Catholic Church in Madagascar and the Church of Jesus Christ in Madagascar completely oppose abortion. Marie Fabien Raharilamboniaina, head of the Episcopal Conference of Madagascar, has argued that the life of the infant is sacred. The church is influential on the electorate, and politicians fear losing its support.

== History ==
Madagascar's law was inherited from the French Penal Code of 1810. On 15 June 1898, Governor-General Joseph Gallieni issued a decree, summarized as "diverse measures aimed at favoring the growth of the population in Imerina". It criminalized abortion. The government believed that Madagascar had a high abortion rate because a lack of medical facilities caused women to fear pregnancy. Gallieni believed the ban would reduce maternal deaths during childbirth. During the colonial period, Christian views, such as sexual morals, were associated with social mobility. A 1920 French law banned contraception and abortion, with the intent of increase birth rates. Madagascar retained this law until amending it in December 2017.

=== 21st century ===
Madagascar signed the Maputo Protocol in 2003, but did not ratify it. The treaty guarantees a right to abortion. In late 2007, multiple United Nations agencies suggested that the country's abortion ban be lifted. Catholic Church representatives and President Marc Ravalomanana stated their disapproval.

Since 1984, Republican presidents of the United States implemented the Mexico City policy, which prohibited U.S. federal funding for foreign organizations that advocate for abortion. Donald Trump reinstated and expanded it in 2017. Madagascar was strongly impacted by the policy as it had few foreign donors. At the time, the United States Agency for International Development (USAID) was a major source of funding for non-governmental organizations (NGOs) that supported the Ministry of Health (MOH) and supplied contraceptives to health facilities. In 2014, 85% of the country's sexual and reproductive healthcare funding came from USAID, followed by 11% from the United Nations Population Fund. Without training from NGOs, public-sector providers were unable to provide long-acting or permanent contraceptive methods. Women in Madagascar faced higher fees, stock-outs, and further distances to access contraceptives. Some had unintended pregnancies. Madagascar's government listed the loss of USAID funding as an obstacle to its family planning commitments.

Two international NGOs, including MSI Reproductive Choices, were major contraception partners of the MOH. Both refused to sign the Mexico City policy because they advocate for the legalization of abortion, though they do not provide illegal abortions. USAID's funding for MSI in Madagascar was redistributed to organizations such as Population Services International. MSI stopped receiving $3.5 million from USAID, which was nearly half of its budget in Madagascar; it recovered $1 million in 2018. MSI scaled back on 21 of its 22 contraception clinics, shut down its voucher program that provided free contraceptives, and ended support to 100 public and 90 private health facilities. It also returned twelve vehicles, which it partly replaced through a donation, which were transferred to a U.S. organization. In 2021, Joe Biden reversed the Mexico City Policy.

In December 2017, the parliament rejected a proposal to decriminalize therapeutic abortion. The proposal was opposed by politicians and the public. The abortion-rights group Nifin'Akanga led a debate in protest. Participants argued that abortion was a public health issue and chanted "Keep your rosaries off our ovaries!" A committee continued to look into the draft law in 2022. The University of Antananarivo hosted the country's first event for International Safe Abortion Day in 2019. In December 2019, a visiting delegation from the African Union advocated for Madagascar to ratify the Maputo Protocol. During the COVID-19 pandemic, use of family planning in health centers went down by 40%. This led to an increase in unwanted pregnancies and abortions. MSI received government permission to use its buses to deliver services to women's homes and take women to health facilities. In 2021, a documentary about Nifin'Akanga's research was shown at the Institut français de Madagascar and broadcast on the radio. In May 2022, the group led a protest with founding member Mbolatiana Raveloarimisa outside of the National Assembly. When France declared a constitutional right to abortion, Raveloarimisa spoke at the ceremony.

=== 2021 proposal ===
On 2 November 2021, independent MP Masy Goulamaly introduced a bill allowing abortion in the case of rape or incest. She emphasized that her proposal would provide for abortions when medically necessary, not on-demand. The president of the National Order of Physicians, Eric Andrianasolo, supported legalizing abortions performed to protect health. The deputy of the ruling MAPAR coalition, Aina Rafenomanantsoa, opposed the bill on the grounds of fetal rights. The Catholic Church lobbied against the bill.

The government did not comment on the bill. On 17 May 2022, it was withdrawn without deliberation. Rapporteurs said the bill was "incompatible with Malagasy values". Supporters of the bill on social media said the decision was hypocritical and criticized President of the National Assembly Christine Razanamahasoa for opposing the bill. Women's rights activist Marie Christina Kolo said the decision was "insupportable". La Première reported in 2023 that Goulamaly was proposing an abortion bill every year, though they were always withdrawn. Razanamahasoa said in March 2024 that she supported wider debate and awareness about abortion. She said the situation in Madagascar was "kind of special" due to the role of Christianity. In 2024, the regional director of the United Nations Population Fund, Lydia Zigomo, urged Madagascar to reform its law.

== Prevalence ==
Between 1990–1994 and 2015–2019, the unintended pregnancy rate in Madagascar decreased 27%, and the share of unintended pregnancies resulting in abortion rose from 43% to 63%. Nearly 75,000 illegal abortions are performed per year, according to the Center for Reproductive Rights in 2022. A 2016 survey in ten districts of Madagascar found that 11% of sexually active women had had an abortion in the past ten years. In Madagascar, abortion providers are known as "angel makers". In 2015, the Ministry of Health estimated that abortion caused 11.8% of maternal deaths. Unsafe abortions are the second-leading cause of maternal mortality in Madagascar, behind postpartum hemorrhage. Three women per day die of induced or spontaneous abortion, according to MSI Reproductive Choices in 2019.

=== Methods ===
According to a 2021 study, 52% of abortions are performed outside of medical facilities, and 31% are by people without medical training. Private abortion providers are common, especially in Antananarivo. The cost of the procedure and transportation make it difficult for women to access these. An abortion from a doctor costs about 50,000 ariary (€10), as of 2020. Common methods performed by trained providers include curettage, insertion of a catheter, and use of misoprostol alone. Manual vacuum aspiration is preferred by many women, who believe it "cleans" the womb similarly to menstruation. La Gazette de la Grande Ile has written that, despite the ban, finding an abortion provider is easier than finding a safe childbirth facility. The National Order of Physicians does not perform abortions; its director, Eric Andrianasolo, told Radio France Internationale in 2018 that the organization instead offers alternatives, saying it was "complicated to speak freely about it".

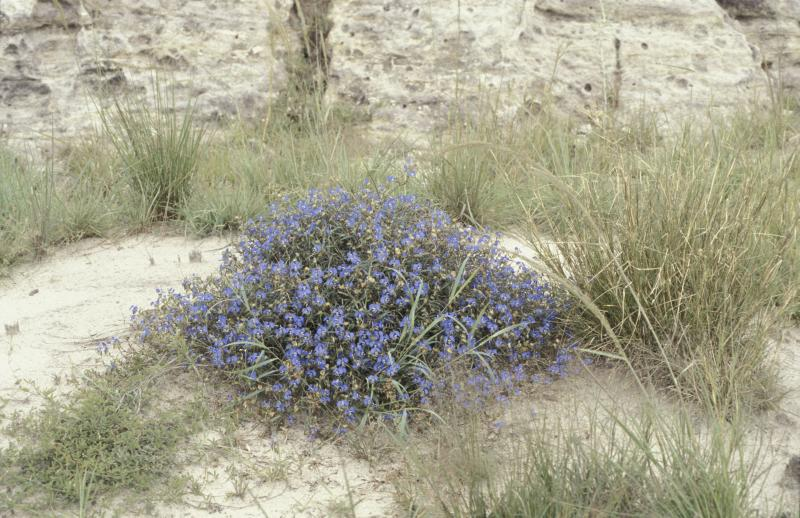
The abortifacent plant nifin'akanga

Misoprostol is widely available but not regulated for abortions. Use of misoprostol is not correlated with lower risk of infection. Doctor's instructions are varied and do not match WHO guidelines and can result in side effects. Black market vendors sell adulterated misoprostol pills. Abortions are often self-induced with abortifacient herbs, tambavy. Some women induce abortions by taking pills or inserting objects into their uteri. Many women receive abortions from traditional midwives, reninjaza, who are not medically qualified. Traditional providers charge much lower fees than medical providers. Most women in villages consult traditional reproductive health providers, matrones. They commonly provide clients with tambavy teas, which may be uterotonic. Matrones often deny knowledge of tambavy that are abortifacient. Abortifacient plants include nifin'akanga and ahilava. The former was the basis of the name of the abortion-rights group Nifin'Akanga.

=== Post-abortion care ===
In 2016, an estimated 27.7% of abortions resulted in post-abortion care (PAC). MSI provides PAC in public hospitals to 200,000 women per year. The most common complication is organ perforation. Misoprostol was approved for PAC in 2017. It is not approved for use by private-sector health facilities. Approval of the drug was controversial as it can be used to induce abortions. As of 2016, misoprostol was available only at MSI clinics under the name Misoclear.

=== Societal factors ===
Abortion is a taboo subject in Madagascar. It is considered to violate the concept of life force, or aïna. Pregnancies, including unwanted ones, are considered positive signs of a woman's fertility. Contraception is rare. One-fifth of women do not have access to it in Madagascar. Most cannot afford it. Other reasons for the taboo include rumors about negative health effects and pressure from abusive husbands. Although Malagasy families historically preferred having many children, many are now having fewer children to focus on finances and completing school. Mobile contraceptive clinics from MSI have been popular in many villages. Many students have premarital sex, but contraceptive use is low. Many believe the side effects of contraception are more problematic than abortion. Some are discouraged from using birth control by their families. Women who are more likely to have had abortions are those who are young, have more education, or have ever had transactional sex. Abortion is more common in urban than rural areas.
