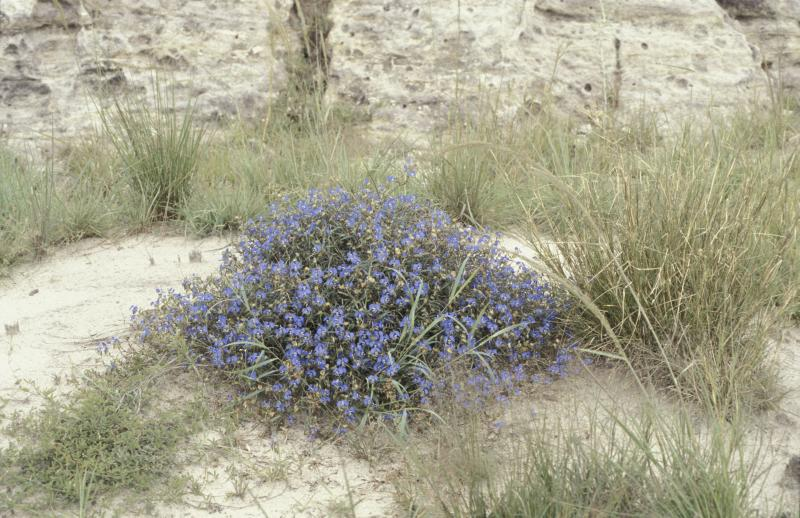
- A mass of Commelina madagascarica

Scientific classification
- Kingdom: Plantae
- Clade: Embryophytes
- Clade: Tracheophytes
- Clade: Spermatophytes
- Clade: Angiosperms
- Clade: Monocots
- Clade: Commelinids
- Order: Commelinales
- Family: Commelinaceae
- Genus: Commelina
- Species: C. madagascarica

Binomial name
- Commelina madagascarica C.B. Clarke

= Commelina madagascarica =

Species of plant

Commelina madagascarica is a monocotyledonous, herbaceous plant in the dayflower family from Madagascar. It is commonly known as nifin'akanga in Madagascar, where it is used medicinally as an abortifacient, a galactogogue, and a treatment for conjunctivitis and acne. It is also used for ritual purposes in joro or ancestral invocation around the Lake Alaotra region.

It has delicate, richly blue flowers, narrow leaves, and bushy stems. Its roots are fibrous, fleshy, and fusiform. These roots, and the plant's buried rhizome, make it very resistant to prairie fires.

The species was first described by Charles Baron Clarke in 1881. Commelina madagascarica is one of the most common plants found in the pseudo-steppe grasslands formed anthropogenically by grass fires in Isalo Massif. Generally, it is common to dry prairies and rocky areas between 1,500 meters (4,900 ft) and 2,000 meters (6,600 ft) above sea level.

The Malagasy abortion-rights group Nifin'akanga takes its name from the plant, since it is commonly used in illicit abortions.
