= Thanaka =

Cosmetic paste made from ground bark, common in Myanmar

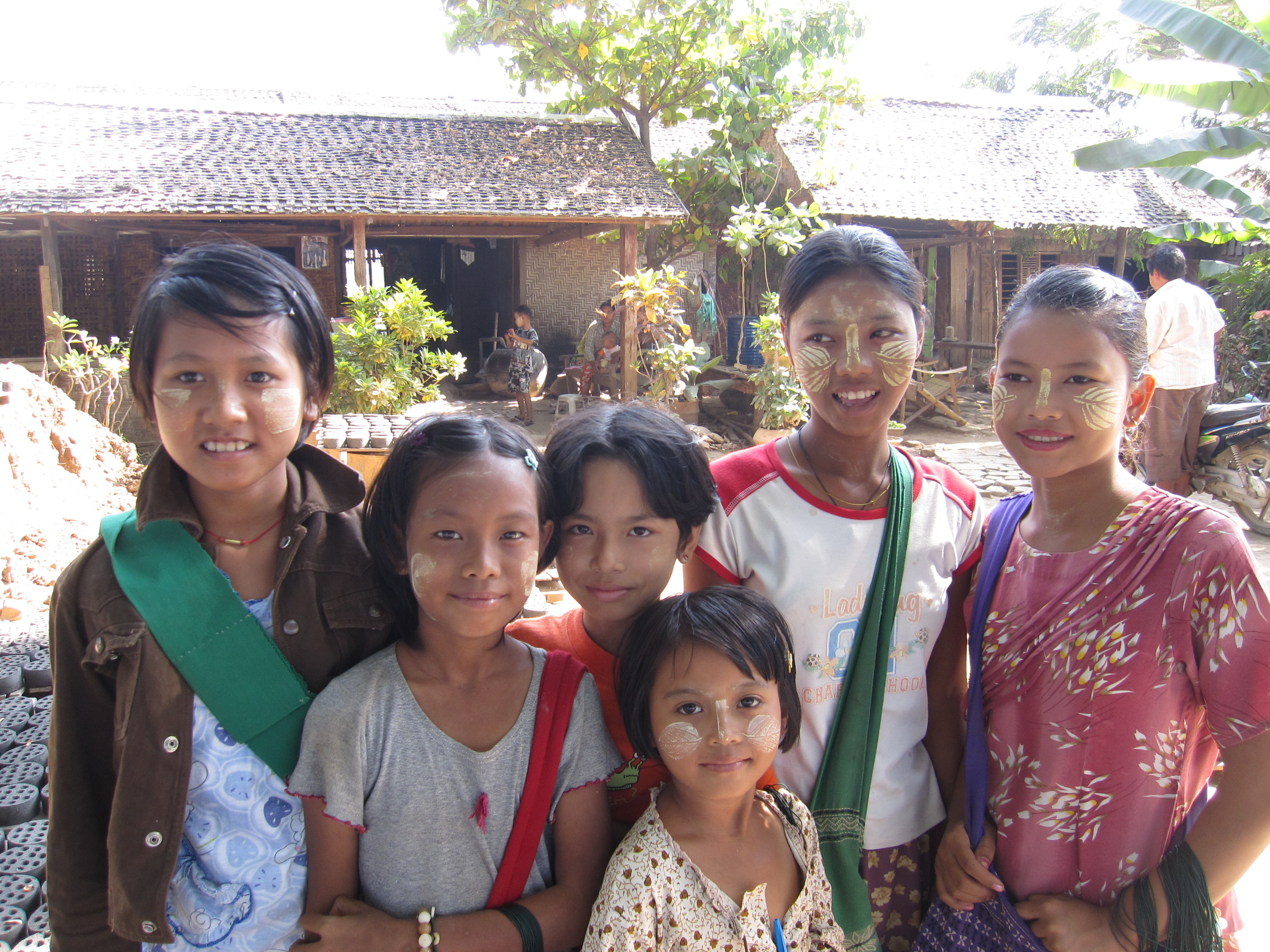
Village girls wearing thanaka in Ava, Myanmar

Thanaka (Burmese: သနပ်ခါး, MLCTS: sa.nap hka:; pronounced [θənəkʰá]) is a paste made from ground bark. It is a distinctive feature of the culture of Myanmar, seen commonly applied to the face and sometimes the arms of women and girls, and is used to a lesser extent also by men and boys.

== History ==
Thanaka has been used by Burmese people since the mid-11th century. In a Bagan Pagoda, there is a Bagan era wall painting of a Bagan woman wearing thanaka. The earliest literary reference to thanakha is in a 14th-century poem written by King Razadarit's Mon-speaking consort. During King Bayinnaung, Alungpaya and Bodawpaya's military campaign in Thailand, thanakha was first introduced to Thai people. Mentions of thanaka also exist in the 15th-century literary works of Burmese monk-poet Shin Raṭṭhasāra (1486–1529).

== Source and preparation ==
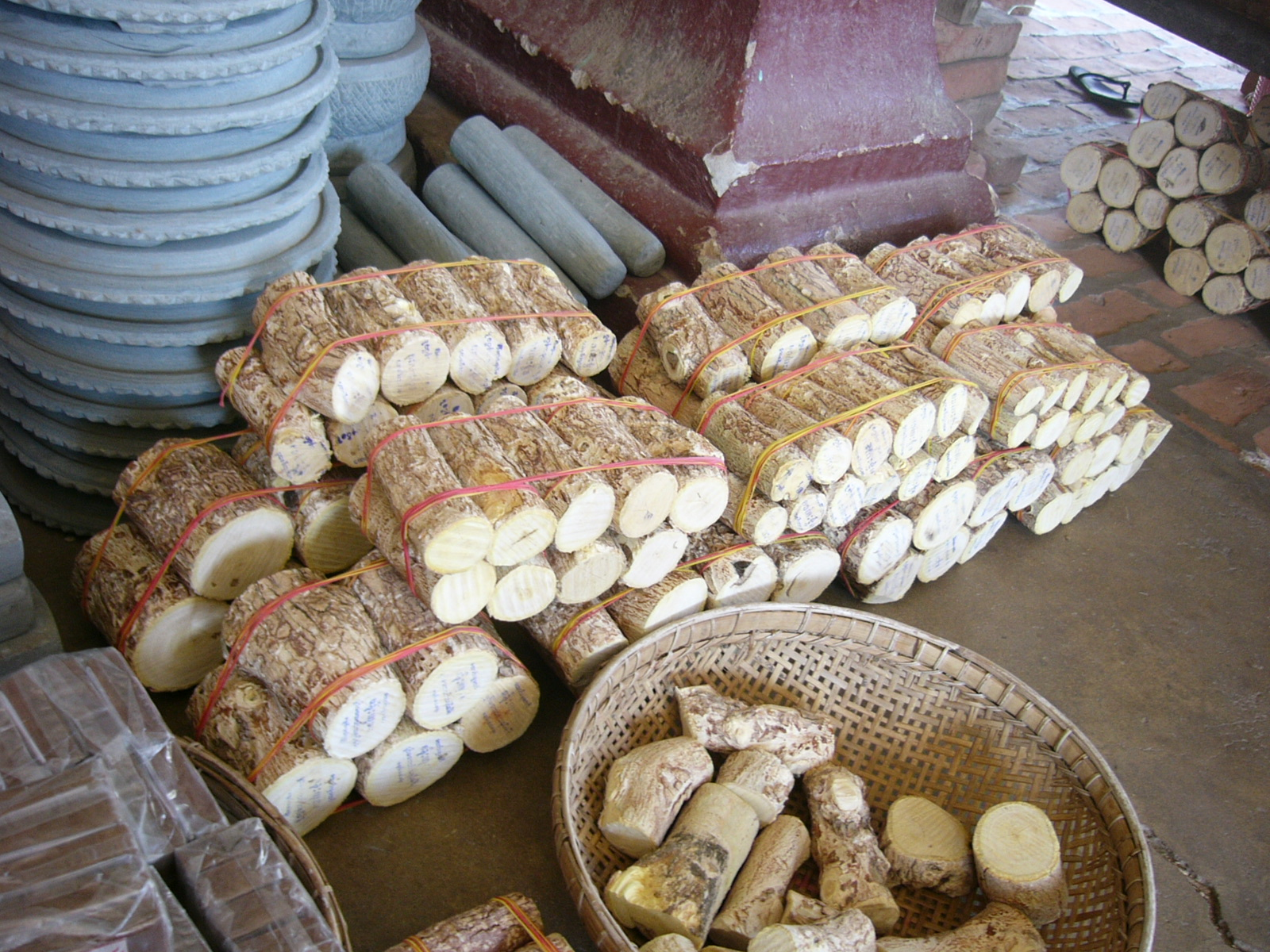
Thanaka wood (Hesperethusa crenulata) for sale

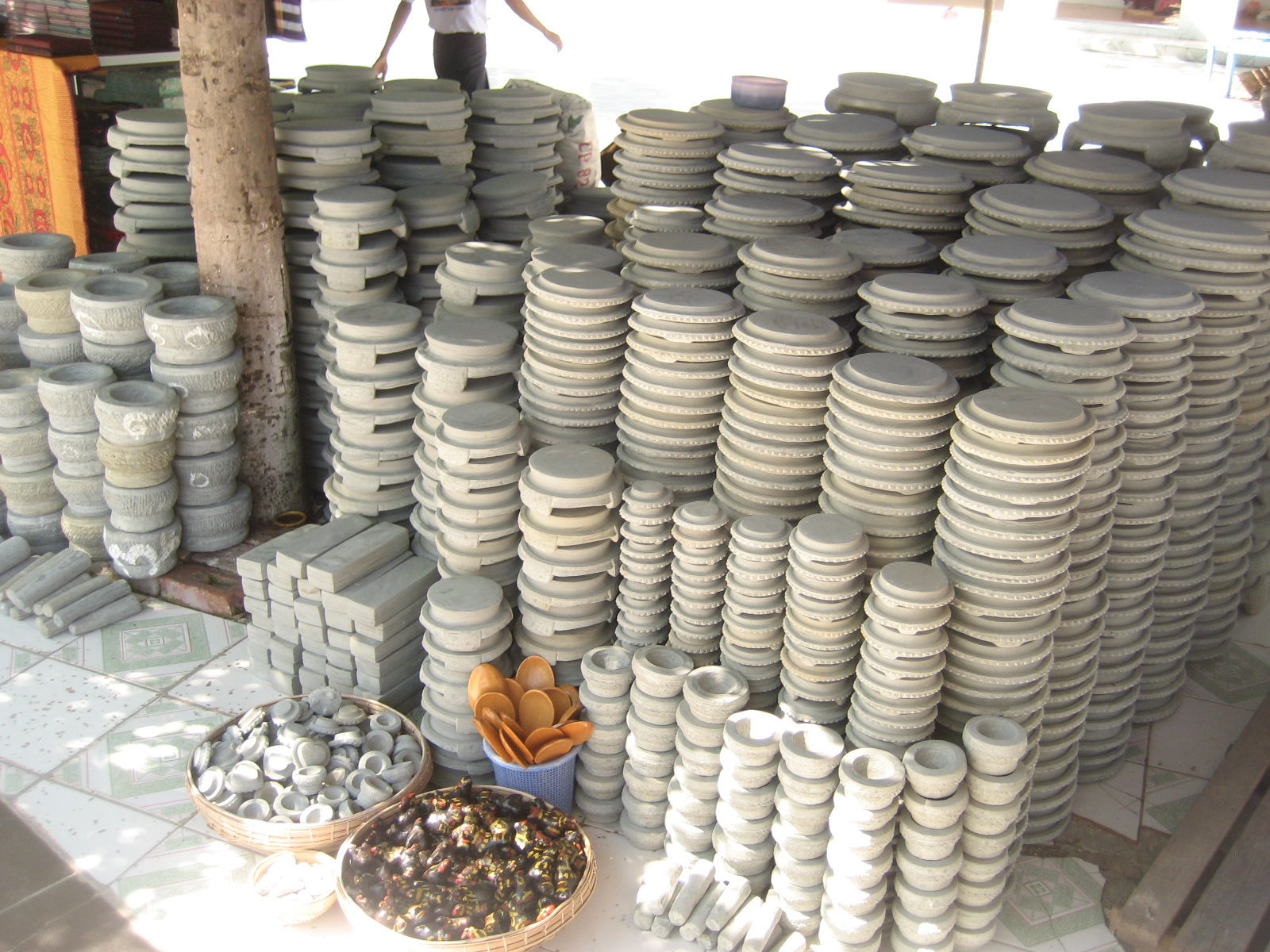
Kyauk pyin stone slabs for grinding thanaka at a pagoda market in Sagaing

The wood of several trees may be used to produce thanaka cream; these trees grow abundantly in central Myanmar. They include principally Murraya spp. (thanaka) but also Limonia acidissima (theethee or wood apple). The two most popular are Shwebo thanaka from Sagaing Region and Shinmadaung thanaka from Magway Region. A more recent contender sold as a paste is Taunggyi Maukme thanaka from southern Shan State. Thanaka trees are perennials, and a tree must be at least 35 years old before it is considered mature enough to yield good-quality cuttings. Thanaka in its natural state is sold as small logs individually or in bundles, but nowadays also available as a paste or in powder form.

Thanaka cream is made by grinding the bark, wood, or roots of a thanaka tree with a small amount of water on a circular slate slab called kyauk pyin, which has a channel around the rim for the water to drain into.

== Application, style and properties ==
Thanaka cream has been used by Burmese men, women, and children (especially women as makeup) for over 2,000 years. It has a fragrant scent somewhat similar to sandalwood. The creamy paste is applied to the face in attractive designs, the most common form being a circular patch on each cheek, nose, sometimes made stripey with the fingers known as thanaka bè gya, or patterned in the shape of a leaf, often also highlighting the bridge of the nose with it at the same time. It may be applied from head to toe (thanaka chi zoun gaung zoun).

Apart from cosmetic beauty, thanaka also gives a cooling sensation and provides protection from sunburn. It is believed to help remove acne and promote smooth skin. It is also an anti-fungal. Researchers have suggested Marmesin is the primary compound responsible for ultraviolet (UV) protection.

A 2010 study conducted by the Chulalongkorn University in Bangkok and the University of London found that thanaka bark has antioxidant and anti-inflammatory properties while also absorbing UV radiation. The research additionally revealed that Thanaka inhibits tyrosinase, an enzyme that triggers melanin synthesis and affects pores and skin discolouration.

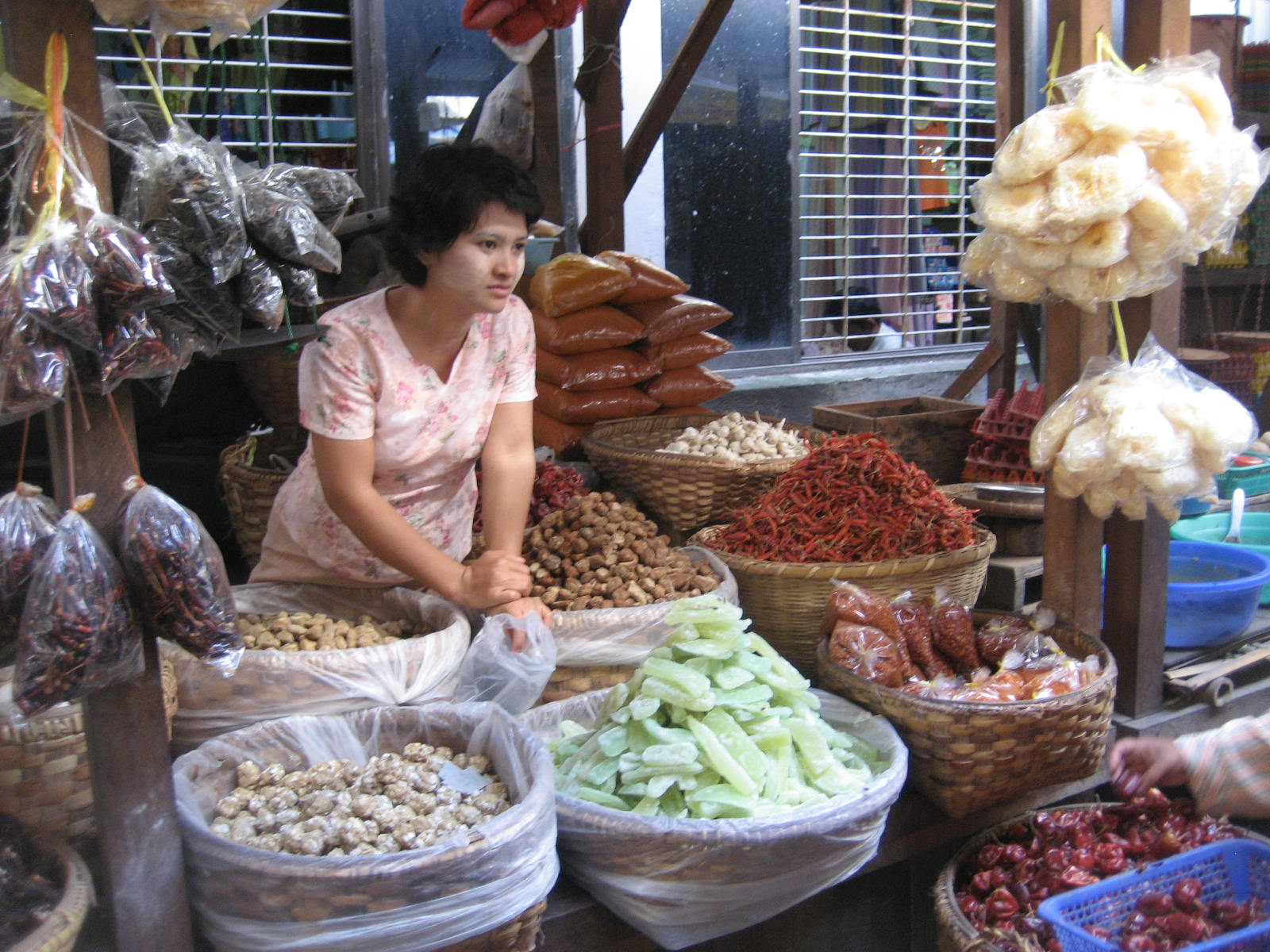
Market stall keeper wearing thanaka, Mandalay

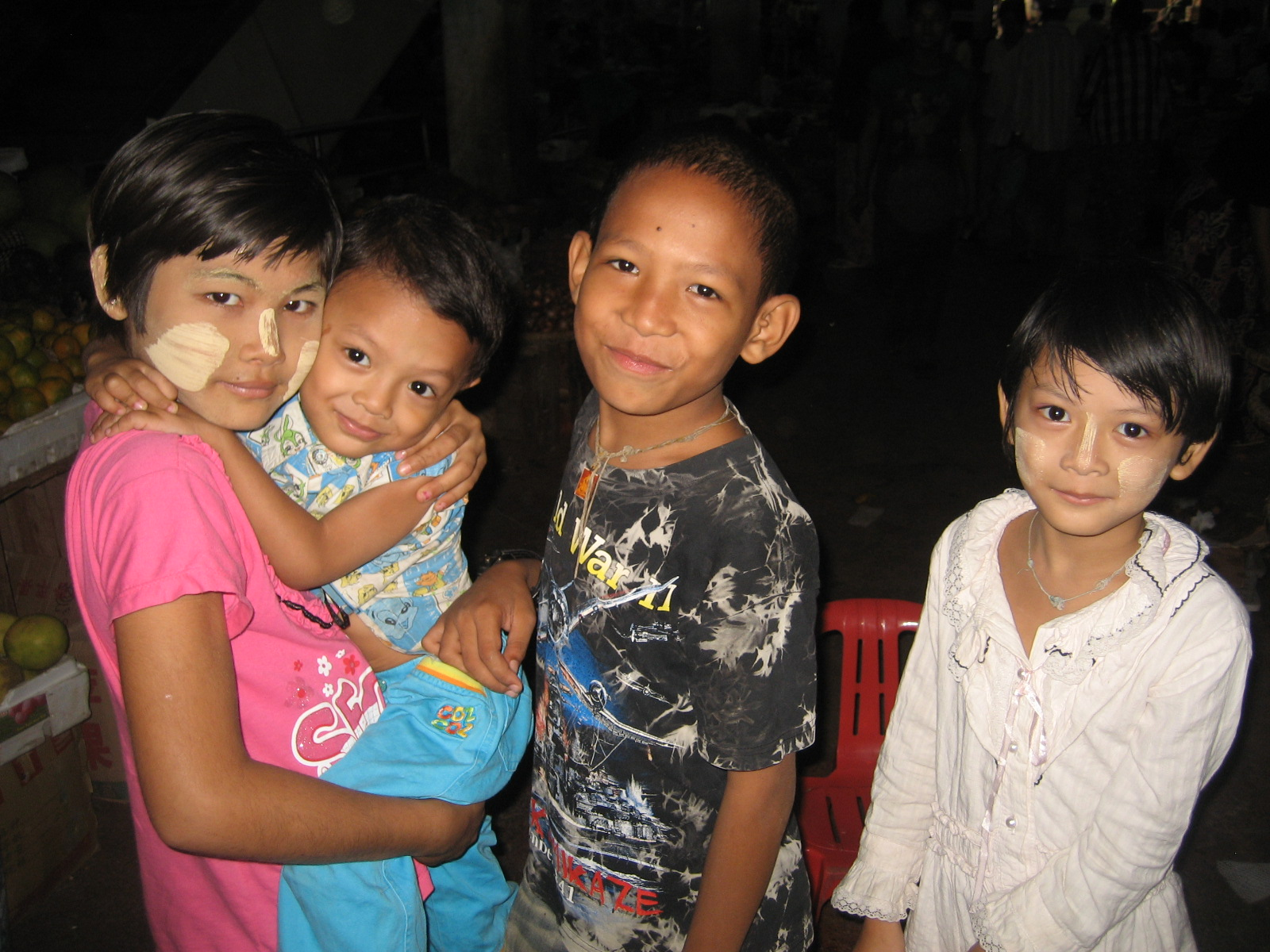
Market children with thanaka, Mandalay

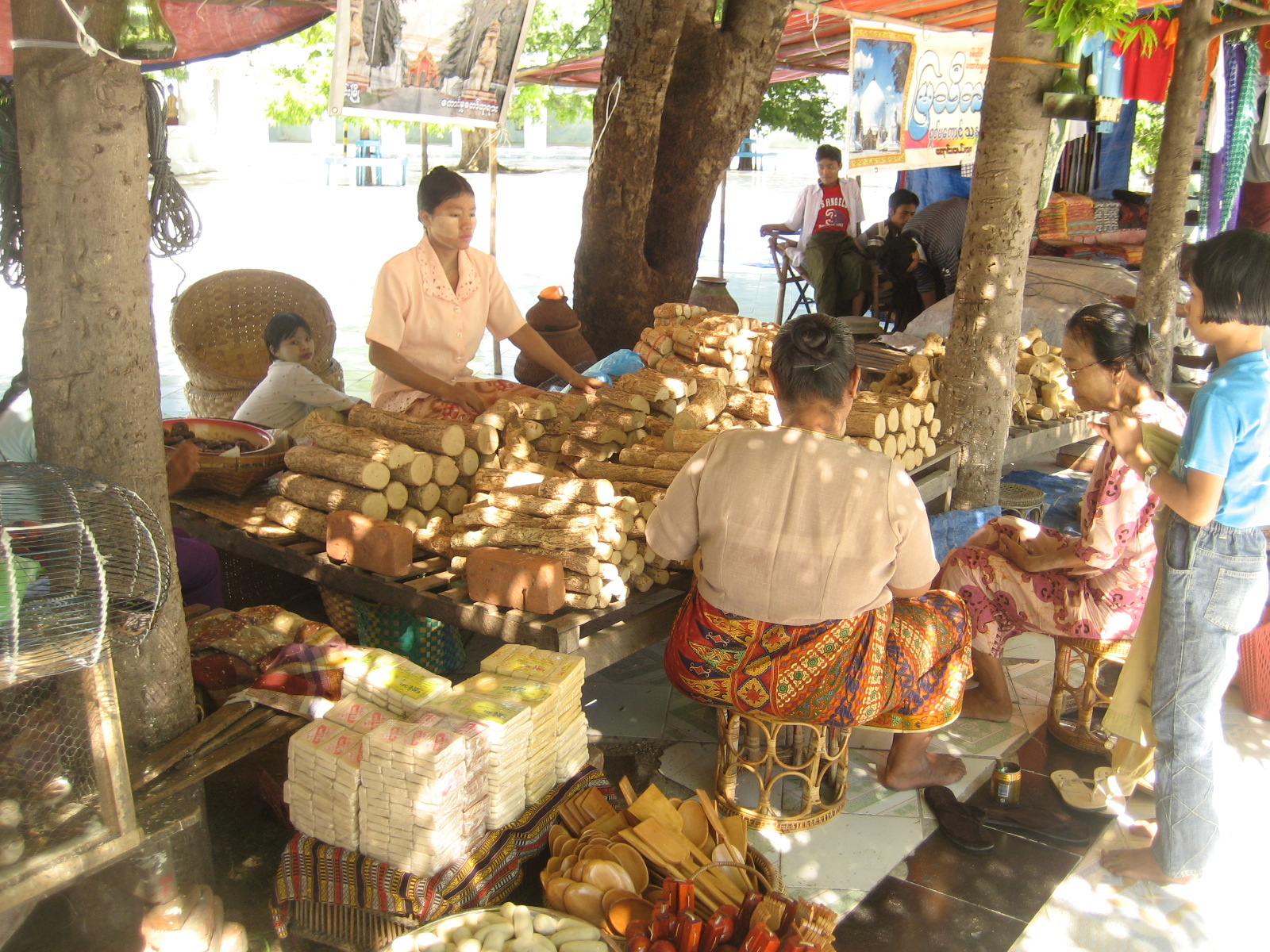
Thanaka seller at Kaunghmudaw Pagoda, Sagaing

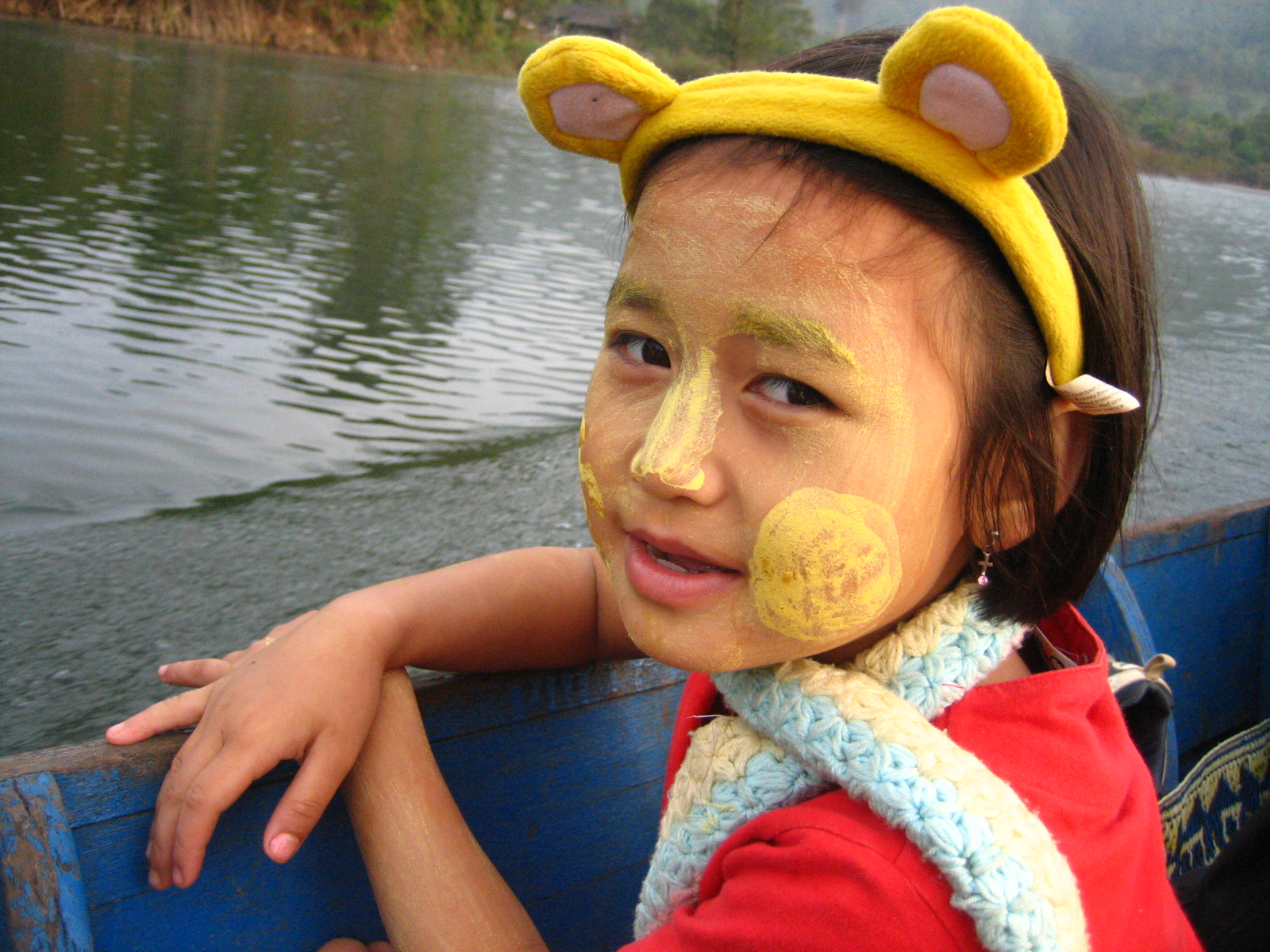
A Karen child with thanaka on her face

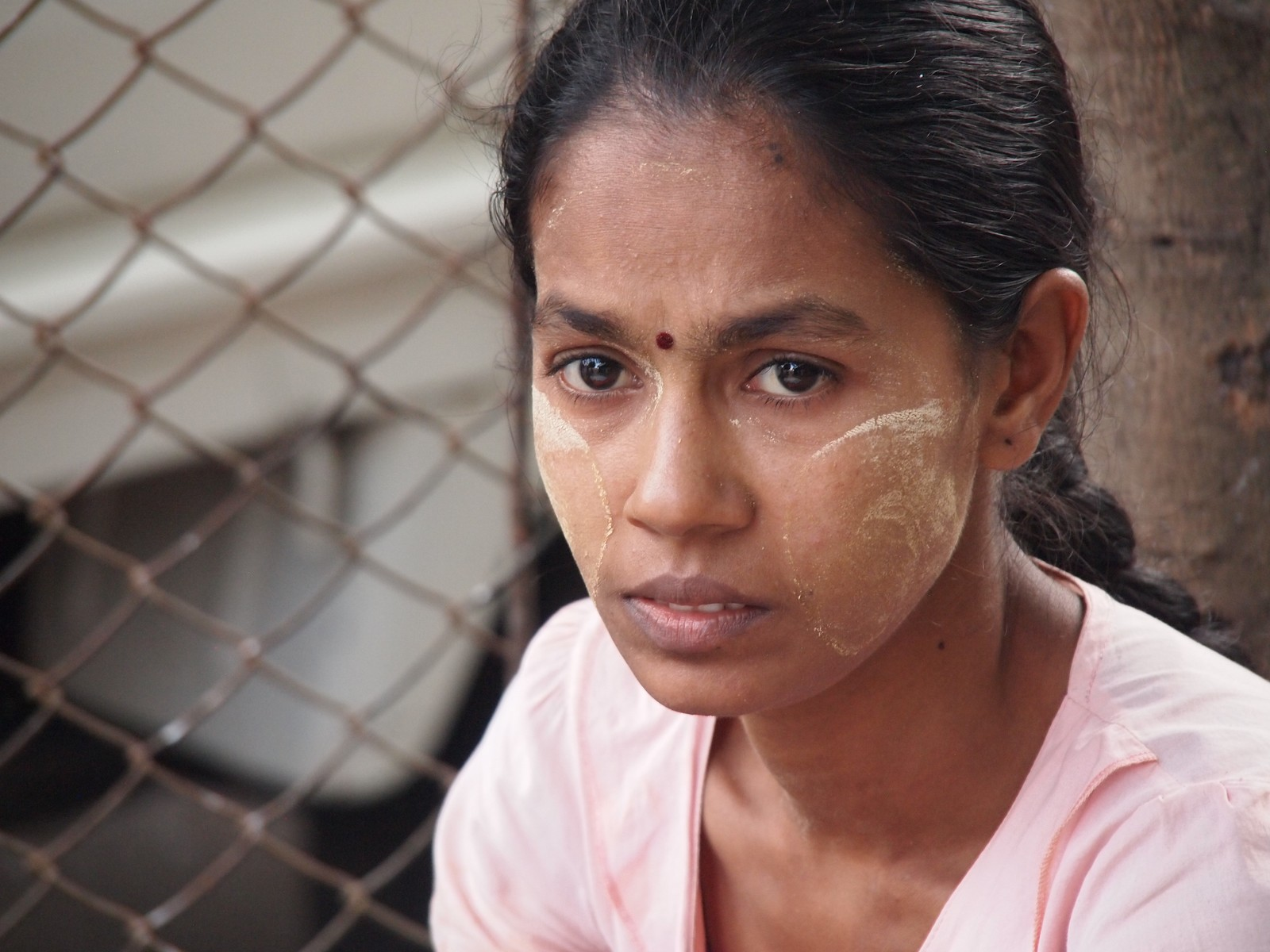
A Burmese Hindu woman wearing thanaka

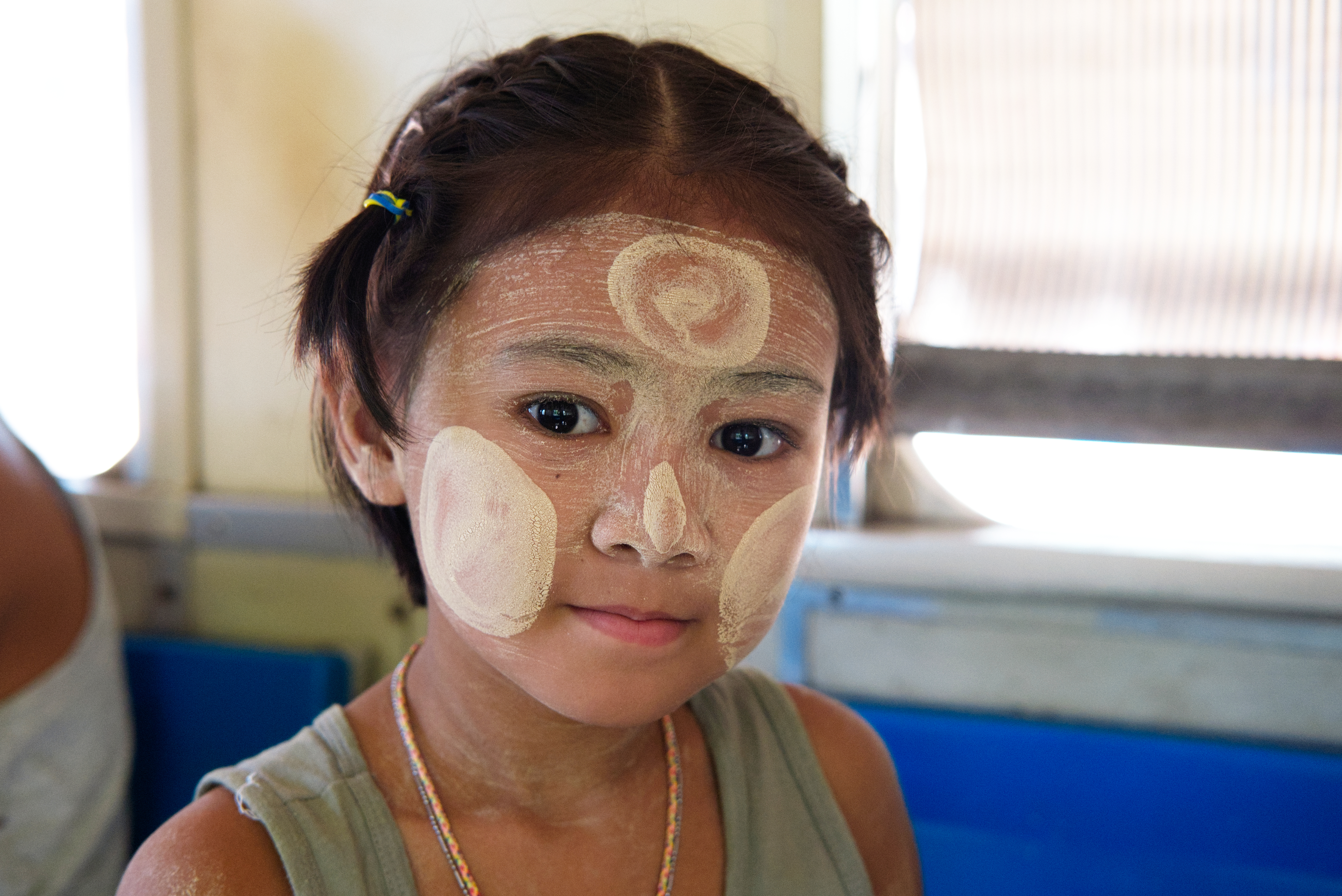
A girl wearing thanaka in Yangon

== See also ==
- Masonjoany
- Borak (cosmetic)
- Face powder
- Culture of Myanmar
- Culture of India
