= Kyaswa of Prome =

Kyaswa

Viceroy of Prome
- Reign: c. 1305 – 1344
- Predecessor: Pazzawta (as governor)
- Successor: Saw Yan Naung (as governor)
- Born: c. 1260s Pagan (Bagan)? Pagan Kingdom
- Died: c. 1344; Prome (Pyay); Pinya Kingdom
- House: Pagan
- Father: Narathihapate
- Mother: Shin Mauk? (Note: (Hmannan Vol. 2 2003: 214) says Kyaswa was a younger brother of Thihathu of Prome. If he was a full brother, then his mother would be Shin Mauk. However, he could have been a half-brother.)
- Religion: Theravada Buddhism

Kyaswa (Burmese: ကျစွာ, pronounced [tɕa̰zwà]) was viceroy of Prome (Pyay) from c. 1305 to 1344. (Note: Standard chronicles Maha Yazawin and Hmannan Yazawin are internally inconsistent. (Maha Yazawin Vol. 2 2006: 163) and (Hmannan Vol. 2 2003: 214) say that Kyaswa died, having been in office for 39 years, and was succeeded by Saw Yan Naung in 685 ME (29 March 1323 to 28 March 1324). But the chronicles (Maha Yazawin Vol. 1 2006: 280) and (Hmannan Vol. 1 2003: 403) themselves say that Yan Naung became governor of Prome after Kyawswa I of Pinya had become king in 704 ME (29 March 1342 to 28 March 1343). (Per contemporary inscriptional evidence (Than Tun 1959: 124), Kyawswa I became undisputed king on 29 March 1344. Thus Yan Naung most probably became governor only on or after 29 March 1344.)) He was a younger brother of the patricide governor Thihathu of Prome, and son of King Narathihapate of Pagan.

== Bibliography ==
- Kala, U (2006) [1724]. Maha Yazawin (in Burmese). Vol. 1–3 (4th printing ed.). Yangon: Ya-Pyei Publishing.
- Maha Sithu (2012) [1798]. Kyaw Win; Thein Hlaing (eds.). Yazawin Thit (in Burmese). Vol. 1–3 (2nd printing ed.). Yangon: Ya-Pyei Publishing.
- Royal Historical Commission of Burma (2003) [1832]. Hmannan Yazawin (in Burmese). Vol. 1–3. Yangon: Ministry of Information, Myanmar.
- Than Tun (December 1959). "History of Burma: A.D. 1300–1400". Journal of Burma Research Society. XLII (II).

Kyaswa of Prome Pinya Kingdom Born: c. 1260s Died: c. 1344
Royal titles
Preceded by Pazzawta as governor	Viceroy of Prome c. 1305 – 1344	Succeeded by Saw Yan Naung as governor
