= Oath of office =

Official promise by a person in a public office to lawfully fulfill its duties

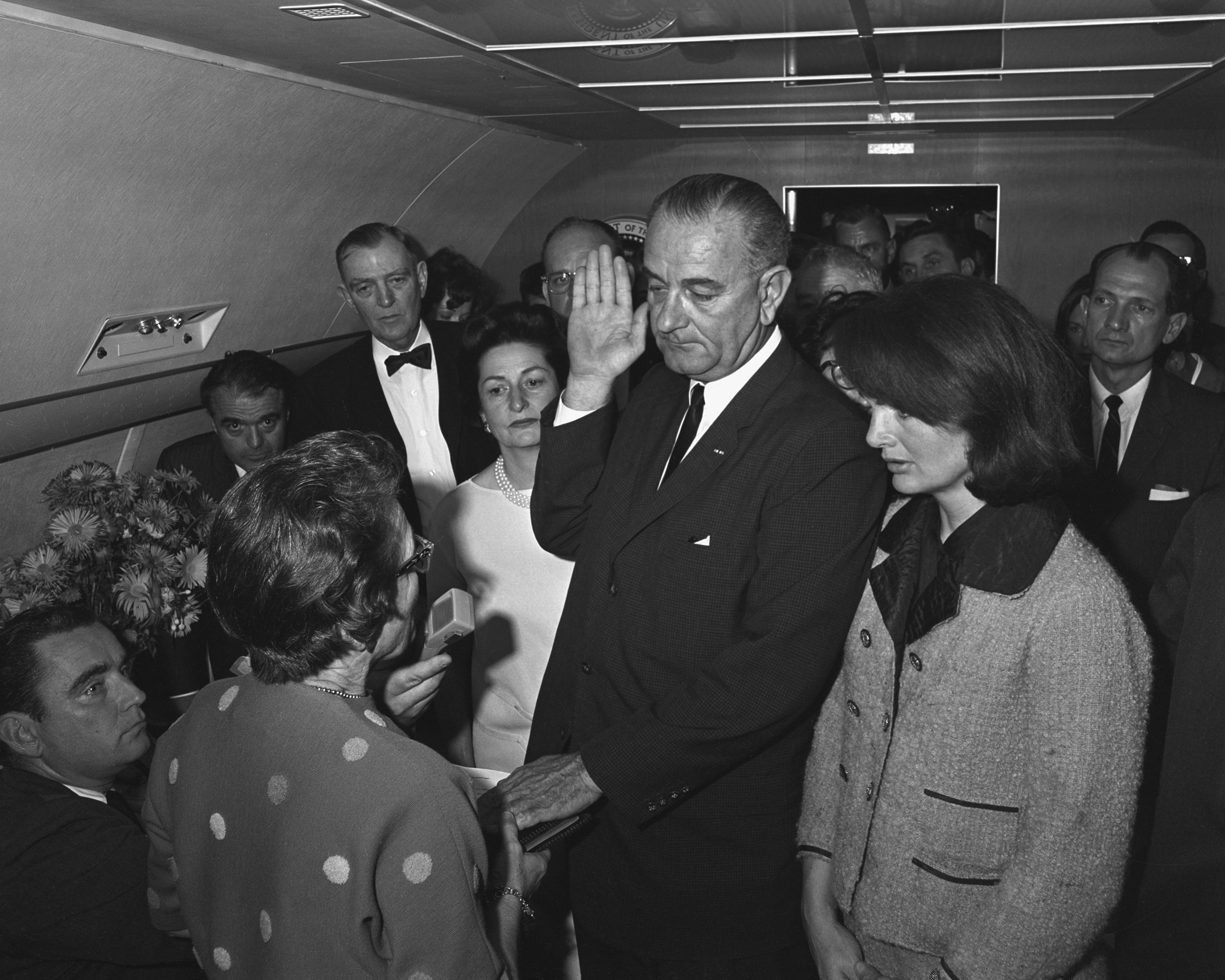
Lyndon B. Johnson taking the American presidential oath of office in 1963, after the assassination of John F. Kennedy

An oath of office is an oath or affirmation a person takes before assuming the duties of an office, usually a position in government or within a religious body, although such oaths are sometimes required of officers of other organizations. Such oaths are often required by the laws of the state, religious body, or other organization before the person may actually exercise the powers of the office or organization. It may be administered at an inauguration, coronation, enthronement, or other ceremony connected with the taking up of office itself, or it may be administered privately. In some cases it may be administered privately and then repeated during a public ceremony.

Some oaths of office are statements of allegiance and loyalty to a constitution or other legal text or to a person or office-holder (e.g., an oath to support the constitution of the state, or of loyalty to the king or queen) (see Oath of allegiance). Under the laws of a state, it may be considered treason or a high crime to betray a sworn oath of office. In many cases, the oath is performed using an oath book, typically religious scripture such as the Bible.

The word "oath" and the phrase "I swear" refer to a solemn vow. For those who choose not to, the alternative terms "solemn promise" or "solemnly affirm" and "I promise" or "I affirm" are sometimes used.

== Antigua and Barbuda ==
The Governor-General of Antigua and Barbuda, before entering into his duties, must make an oath of allegiance and oath of office in the form specified in the Constitution of Antigua and Barbuda; the same is required of the Prime Minister, other Ministers and Parliamentary Secretaries, but they also take the oath of secrecy.

Members of the Public Service Commission for Antigua and Barbuda take the oath of allegiance and oath of office, while members of both Houses of Parliament are only required to make the oath of allegiance prior to participating in their respective House (save for the oath-taking itself). Any of these oaths may be taken as an affirmation; when doing so "So help me God" is omitted.

The oath of allegiance is set forth as follows:

I, ___________, do swear (or solemnly affirm) that I will faithfully bear true allegiance to His Majesty King Charles the Third, His Heirs and Successors, according to law.

So help me God.

The oath of office is set forth as follows:

I, ___________, do swear (or solemnly affirm) that I will honour, uphold and preserve the Constitution of Antigua and Barbuda and the law, that I will conscientiously, impartially and to the best of my ability discharge my duties as and do right to all manner of people without fear or favour, affection or ill-will.

So help me God.

The oath of secrecy is set forth as follows:

I, ___________, do swear (or solemnly affirm) that I will not on any account, at any time whatsoever, disclose any counsel, advice, opinion or vote given by any Minister as a member of the Cabinet and that I will not, except with the authority of the Cabinet and to such extent as may be required for the proper conduct of the government of Antigua and Barbuda, directly or indirectly reveal the business or proceedings of the Cabinet or any matter coming to my knowledge as a member of (or Secretary to) the Cabinet.

So help me God.

== Australia ==
All members of the Australian Parliament are required to take before taking their seat in Parliament an Oath or Affirmation of Allegiance before the Governor-General of Australia or someone authorised by them. The requirement to take the oath is set out in section 42 of the Australian Constitution and the wording of the oath and affirmation are set out in a schedule to the Constitution. The oath is:

I, (name), do swear that I will be faithful and bear true allegiance to His Majesty King Charles the Third, His heirs and successors according to law. So help me God!

The affirmation is:

I, (name), do solemnly and sincerely affirm and declare that I will be faithful and bear true allegiance to His Majesty King Charles the Third, His heirs and successors according to law.

Upon taking office, the Governor-General of Australia is required to take the above Oath of Allegiance as well as a second Oath of Office:

I, (name), do solemnly and sincerely swear (or affirm) and declare that I will well and truly serve His Majesty King Charles the Third, His heirs and successors according to law, in the office of Governor-General of the Commonwealth of Australia, and I will do right to all manner of people after the laws and usages of the Commonwealth of Australia, without fear or favour, affection or ill will. So help me God!

In case of affirmation, the phrase "So Help me God" is hereby omitted.

In addition to swearing, the Oath of Allegiance upon becoming a Member of Parliament, the Prime Minister, Ministers and Parliamentary Secretaries also recite an Oath of Office upon entering office. The wording of this oath is not prescribed within the Constitution and is ultimately determined by the Prime Minister of the day. Traditionally the oath has repeated the swearing of allegiance to the Sovereign, although this is not required. The current Oath of Office is:

I, (name), do swear that I will well and truly serve the Commonwealth of Australia, her land and her people, in the office of (position). So Help me God.

The Prime Minister and Ministers shall required take the affirmation of office before the Governor General if in case of affirmation:

I, (name), do solemnly and sincerely affirm and declare that I will well and truly serve the Commonwealth of Australia, her land and her people, in the office of (position).

The Federal Executive Council members shall also required to take their oath:

I, (name), being chosen and summoned by the Governor General of the Commonwealth of Australia to be a member of the Federal Executive Council, do solemnly and sincerely swear/affirm and declare that I will when required the advice of the Governor General for the time being administering the Commonwealth of Australia, to the best of my judgement consistently with the good government of the Commonwealth of Australia, and that I will not disclose the confidential deliberations of the council. So Help me God.

== Bangladesh ==
The President, Prime Minister, Chief Justice, Speaker, Ministers take their oath of office. The oath is taken in the Bengali language.

=== President ===
The oath (or affirmation) of the President is administered by the Speaker:

আমি, (নাম) সশ্রদ্ধচিত্তে শপথ (বা দৃঢ়ভাবে ঘোষণা) করিতেছি যে, আমি আইন-অনুযায়ী বাংলাদেশের রাষ্ট্রপতি-পদের কর্তব্য বিশ্বস্ততার সহিত পালন করিব; আমি বাংলাদেশের প্রতি অকৃত্রিম বিশ্বাস ও আনুগত্য পোষণ করিবঃ আমি সংবিধানের রক্ষণ, সমর্থন ও নিরাপত্তাবিধান করিব: এবং আমি ভীতি বা অনুগ্রহ, অনুরাগ বা বিরাগের বশবর্তী না হইয়া সকলের প্রতি আইন-অনুযায়ী যথাবিহীত আচরণ করিব।

— Third Schedule, Constitution of Bangladesh

I, (name) do solemnly swear (or affirm) that I will faithfully discharge the duties of the office of President of Bangladesh according to law. That I will bear true faith and allegiance to Bangladesh; that I will preserve, protect and defend the Constitution and that I will do right to all manner of people according to law, without fear or favour, affection or ill-will.

— Third Schedule, Constitution of Bangladesh

=== Prime Ministers and other Ministers ===
The oath of office for the Prime Minister and other members of the cabinet is administered by the President:

আমি, (নাম), সশ্রদ্ধচিত্তে শপথ (বা দৃঢ়ভাবে ঘোষণা) করিতেছি যে, আমি আইন-অনুযায়ী সরকারের প্রধানমন্ত্রী (কিংবা ক্ষেত্রমত মন্ত্রী, প্রতি-মন্ত্রী, বা উপমন্ত্রী)-পদের কর্তব্য বিশ্বস্ততার সহিত পালন করিব: আমি বাংলাদেশের প্রতি অকৃত্রিম বিশ্বাস ও আনুগত্য পোষণ করিব; আমি সংবিধানের রক্ষণ, সমর্থন ও নিরাপত্তাবিধান করিব; এবং আমি ভীতি বা অনুগ্রহ, অনুরাগ বা বিরাগের বশবর্তী না হইয়া সকলের প্রতি আইন-অনুযায়ী যথাবিহীত আচরণ করিব।

— Third Schedule, Constitution of Bangladesh

I, (name), do solemnly swear (or affirm) that I will faithfully discharge the duties of the office of Prime Minister (or as the case may be) according to law. That I will bear true faith and allegiance to Bangladesh; that I will preserve, protect and defend the Constitution and that I will do right to all manner of people according to law, without fear or favour, affection or ill-will.

— Third Schedule, Constitution of Bangladesh

The oath of secrecy is as follows:

আমি,(নাম), সশ্রদ্ধচিত্তে শপথ (বা দৃঢ়ভাবে ঘোষণা) করিতেছি যে, সরকারের প্রধানমন্ত্রী (কিংবা ক্ষেত্রমত মন্ত্রী, প্রতিমন্ত্রী, বা উপমন্ত্রী)-রূপে যে সকল বিষয় আমার বিবেচনার জন্য আনীত হইবে বা যে সকল বিষয় আমি অবগত হইব, তাহা প্রধানমন্ত্রী (কিংবা ক্ষেত্রমত মন্ত্রী, প্রতি-মন্ত্রী, বা উপমন্ত্রী)-রূপে যথাযথভাবে আমার কর্তব্য পালনের প্রয়োজন ব্যতীত প্রত্যক্ষ বা পরোক্ষভাবে কোন ব্যক্তিকে জ্ঞাপন করিব না বা কোন ব্যক্তির নিকট প্রকাশ করিব না।

— Third Schedule, Constitution of Bangladesh

I,(Name), do solemnly swear (or affirm) that I will not directly or indirectly communicate or reveal to any person any matter that shall be brought under my consideration or shall become known to me as Prime Minister (or, as the case may be, Minister, Minister of State, or Deputy Minister), except as may be required for the due discharge of my duties as Prime Minister (or, as the case may be, Minister, Minister of State, or Deputy Minister)

— Third Schedule, Constitution of Bangladesh

=== Speaker ===
The Speaker of the Jatiya Sangsad, takes the oath of his or her office as well as the presidential oath, since the acts of president is practiced by the Speaker, whenever necessary:

আমি, (নাম), সশ্রদ্ধচিত্তে শপথ (বা দৃঢ়ভাবে ঘোষণা) করিতেছি যে, আমি আইন-অনুযায়ী সংসদের স্পীকারের কর্তব্য (এবং কখনও আহুত হইলে রাষ্ট্রপতির কর্তব্য) বিশ্বস্ততার সহিত পালন করিব; আমি বাংলাদেশের প্রতি অকৃত্রিম বিশ্বাস ও আনুগত্য পোষণ করিবঃ আমি সংবিধানের রক্ষণ, সমর্থন ও নিরাপত্তাবিধান করিব; এবং আমি ভীতি বা অনুগ্রহ, অনুরাগ বা বিরাগের বশবর্তী না হইয়া সকলের প্রতি আইন-অনুযায়ী যথাবিহীত আচরণ করিব।

— Third Schedule, Constitution of Bangladesh

I, (name), do solemnly swear (or affirm) that I will faithfully discharge the duties of the Speaker of Parliament and (whenever I am called upon so to do) of the President, according to law. That I will bear true faith and allegiance to Bangladesh; that I will preserve, protect and defend the Constitution and that I will do right to all manner of people according to law, without fear or favour, affection or ill-will.

— Third Schedule, Constitution of Bangladesh

=== Chief Justice ===
The oath of office for the Chief Justice is administered by the President whereas the oath of office for other Judges is administered by the Chief Justice:

আমি, (নাম), প্রধান বিচারপতি (বা ক্ষেত্রমত সুপ্রীম কোর্টের আপীল/হাইকোর্ট বিভাগের বিচারক) নিযুক্ত হইয়া সশ্রদ্ধচিত্তে শপথ (বা দৃঢ়ভাবে ঘোষণা) করিতেছি যে, আমি আইন-অনুযায়ী ও বিশ্বস্থতার সহিত আমার পদের কর্তব্য পালন করিব; গণপ্রজাতন্ত্রী বাংলাদেশের সংবিধান আমি বাংলাদেশের প্রতি অকৃত্রিম বিশ্বাস ও আনুগত্য পোষণ করিবঃ আমি বাংলাদেশের সংবিধান ও আইনের রক্ষণ, সমর্থন ও নিরাপত্তাবিধান করিব; এবং আমি ভীতি বা অনুগ্রহ, অনুরাগ বা বিরাগের বশবর্তী না হইয়া সকলের প্রতি আইন-অনুযায়ী যথাবিহিত আচরণ করিব।

— Third Schedule, Constitution of Bangladesh

I, (name), having been appointed Chief Justice of Bangladesh (or Judge of the Appellate/High Court Division of the Supreme Court) do solemnly swear (or affirm) that I will faithfully discharge the duties of my office according to law. That I will bear true faith and allegiance to Bangladesh; that I will preserve, protect and defend the Constitution and the laws of Bangladesh and that I will do right to all manner of people according to law, without fear or favour, affection or ill-will.

— Third Schedule, Constitution of Bangladesh

=== Others ===
The Election Commissioners, members of the Public Service Commission and the Comptroller and Auditor General takes a likely oath of office from the Chief Justice.

The representatives of the people in the local government takes oath from the Prime Minister or the minister in charge of the Local Government Division.

== Belarus ==
The Constitution of Belarus requires the president-elect to recite the following oath before taking office:

Assuming the office of President of the Republic of Belarus, I solemnly swear to faithfully serve the people of the Republic of Belarus, to respect and safeguard the rights and liberties of man and citizen, to abide by and protect the Constitution of the Republic of Belarus, and to discharge strictly and conscientiously the lofty duties that have been bestowed upon me

== Belgium ==
=== King ===
In Belgium, the King is not crowned but swears the constitutional oath in front of both Chambers of the federal parliament in the Palace of the Nation in Brussels in the three official languages:

Dutch: Ik zweer dat ik de Grondwet en de wetten van het Belgische volk zal naleven, 's Lands onafhankelijkheid handhaven en het grondgebied ongeschonden bewaren.

French: Je jure d'observer la Constitution et les lois du peuple belge, de maintenir l'indépendance nationale et l'intégrité du territoire.

German: Ich schwöre, die Verfassung und die Gesetze des belgischen Volkes zu beachten, die Unabhängigkeit des Landes zu erhalten und die Unversehrtheit des Staatsgebietes zu wahren.

In English: I swear that I will observe the constitution and laws of the Belgian people, preserve the country's independence and protect its territorial integrity. (Article 91 of the Belgian Constitution)

=== Prime minister, ministers and state secretaries ===
The prime minister, the ministers and state secretaries of the Belgian federal government swear an oath in front of the Belgian King.

Also the minister-presidents of the Flemish government, of the Walloon government, of the government of the French community, of the government of the German-speaking community and of the Brussels-Capital region government swear the oath at the King. The other members of these governments do not take the oath at the King, but in front of their respective parliaments.

They may choose to take the oath in one or more of the country's languages.

Dutch: Ik zweer getrouwheid aan de Koning, gehoorzaamheid aan de Grondwet en aan de wetten van het Belgische volk.

French: Je jure fidélité au Roi, obéissance à la Constitution et aux lois du Peuple belge.

German: Ich schwöre Treue dem König, Gehorsam der Verfassung und den Gesetzen des belgischen Volkes.

In English: I swear fidelity to the King, obedience to the constitution and to the laws of the Belgian people.

=== Members of the Parliaments ===
The members of the Chambers of Representatives, the Senate, the Flemish Parliament, the Walloon Parliament, the Parliament of the French Community, the Parliament of the German-speaking Community and the Parliament of the Brussels-Capital Region have to swear the following oath:

Dutch: Ik zweer de Grondwet na te leven.

French: Je jure d'observer la Constitution.

German: Ich schwöre, die Verfassung zu beachten.

In English: I swear obedience to the constitution.

=== Public servants ===
All public servants in judiciary and administration, officers of the civil guards and the army and servants in general of any public office have to swear the same oath as ministers, but in front of their respective hierarchical authority rather than of the King. (Note: For instance, teachers of schools organized by a Community or a municipality take this oath of office in front of the school's headmaster.)

=== Mayors and members of municipal executive and city council ===
Flemish mayors and the members of municipal executive and the city council in Flanders have following oath: "Ik zweer de verplichtingen van mijn mandaat trouw na te komen" (I swear to fulfill the duties of my office faithfully).

In Wallonia the old version is still in use: "Je jure fidélité au Roi, obéissance à la Constitution et aux lois du peuple belge."

== Brazil ==
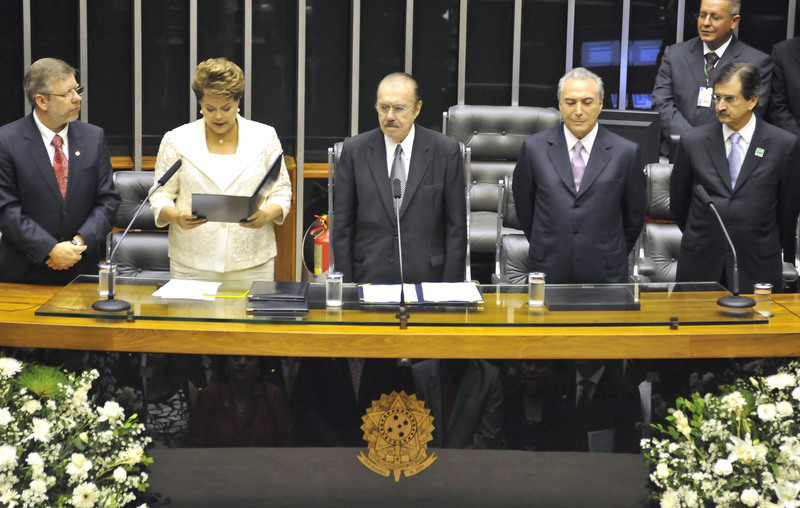
Dilma Rousseff takes the oath of office of the President of Brazil.

=== President and Vice President ===
The affirmation required by the Constitution of Brazil to be taken by the president-elect and vice president-elect upon entering into office is as follows:

Prometo manter, defender e cumprir a Constituição, observar as leis, promover o bem geral do povo brasileiro e sustentar a união, a integridade e a independência do Brasil.

— Article 78, Constitution of Brazil

I promise to preserve, defend and uphold the Constitution, observe the Laws, promote the general welfare of the Brazilian people, and to sustain the union, the integrity and the independence of Brazil.

— Article 78, Constitution of Brazil

=== Chamber of Deputies ===
The affirmation of office for the members of the Chamber is administered by the President, who reads:

Prometo manter, defender e cumprir a Constituição, observar as leis, promover o bem geral do povo brasileiro e sustentar a união, a integridade e a independência do Brasil.

— Article 4, Paragraph 3, Chamber of Deputies Statute

I promise to preserve, defend and uphold the Constitution, observe the laws, promote the general welfare of the Brazilian people, and to sustain the union, the integrity and the independence of Brazil.

— Article 4, Paragraph 3, Chamber of Deputies Statute

The Chamber members, after being called, answer the affirmation with "So I promise" ("Assim o prometo").

=== Federal Senate ===
The affirmation of office for Senators is administered by the President, who reads:

Prometo guardar a Constituição Federal e as leis do país, desempenhar fiel e lealmente o mandato de Senador que o povo me conferiu e sustentar a união, a integridade e a independência do Brasil.

— Article 4, Paragraph 2, Federal Senate Statute

I promise to keep the country's Federal Constitution and laws, to perform faithfully and loyally the mandate of Senator that the people gave me and to sustain the union, the integrity and the independence of Brazil.

— Article 4, Paragraph 2, Federal Senate Statute

The Senate members, after being called, answer the affirmation with "So I promise" ("Assim o prometo").

=== Supreme Federal Court ===
The internal rules of the Supreme Federal Court set out the affirmation that must be taken by justices upon their investiture. Other judges make different affirmations, as provided for by law or in the internal rules of each Court.

Prometo, bem e fielmente, cumprir os deveres do cargo de Ministro do Supremo Tribunal Federal, em confirmidade com a Constituição e as leis da República.

— Article 15, Paragraph 1, Supreme Federal Court Statute

I promise, well and faithfully, to discharge the duties of the office of Justice of the Supreme Federal Court, in accordance to the Constitution and the laws of the Republic.

— Article 15, Paragraph 1, Supreme Federal Court Statute

=== Others ===
The Constitution and laws of the several states and the organic laws of the municipalities also specify affirmations that must be made by the key officers of those entities.

==== Minas Gerais ====
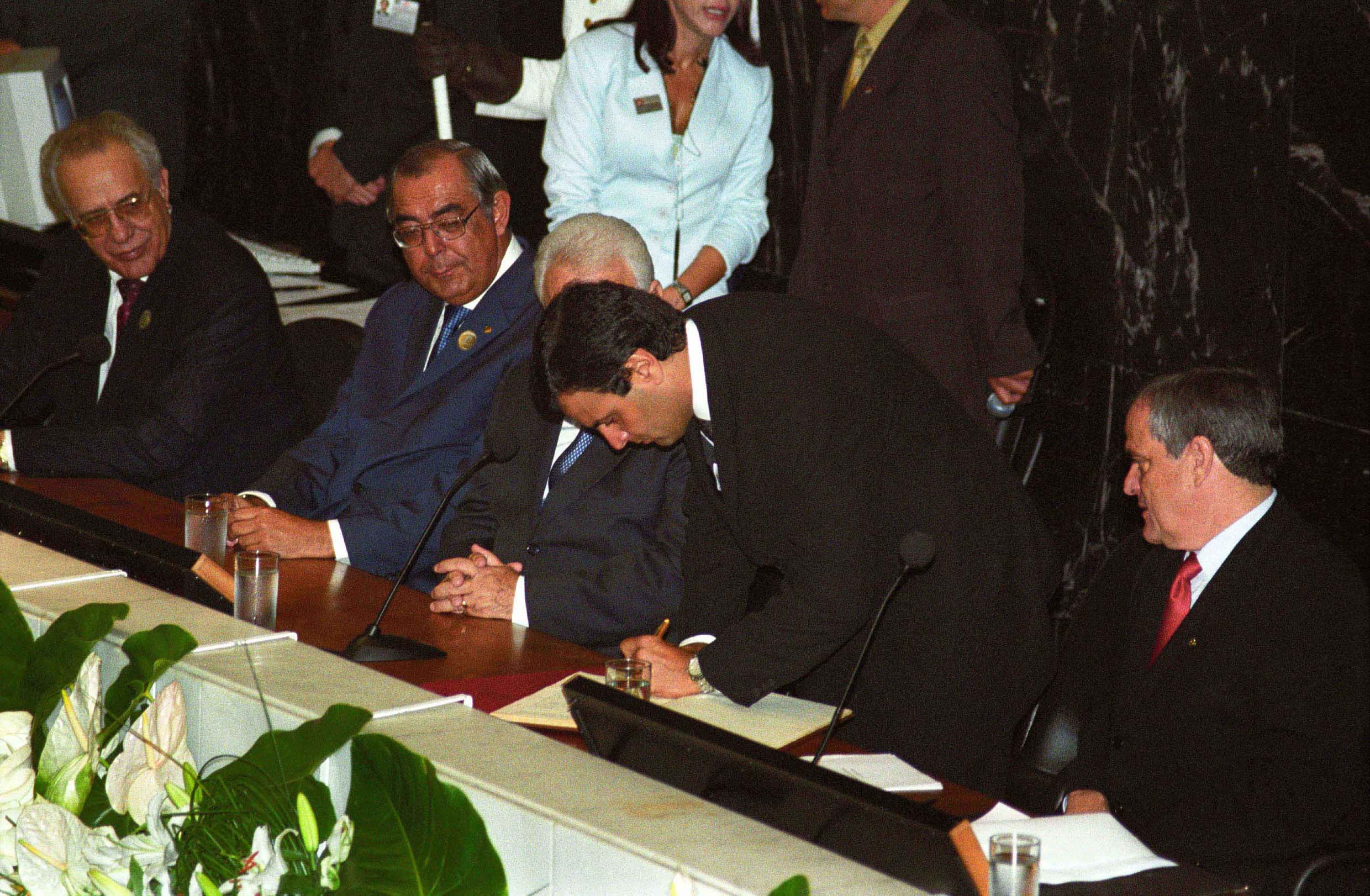
Aécio Neves becoming governor of Minas Gerais on 1 January 2003.

===== Governor and Vice Governor =====
The affirmation required by the Constitution of Minas Gerais to be taken by the governor-elect and vice governor-elect upon entering into office is as follows:

Prometo manter, defender e cumprir a Constituição da República e a do Estado, observar as leis, promover o bem geral do povo mineiro e sustentar a integridade e a autonomia de Minas Gerais.

— Article 86, Constitution of Minas Gerais

I promise to preserve, defend and uphold the Constitution of the Republic and of the State, observe the Laws, promote the general welfare of the Mineiro people, and to sustain the integrity and the autonomy of Minas Gerais.

— Article 86, Constitution of Minas Gerais

== Brunei ==
In Brunei, an oath must be taken by any person in the public services may require to take if the Sultan wishes.

I, ...(name)...., swear by Almighty Allah [for Muslim] /OR/ solemnly and sincerely declare [for non Muslim], that I will be faithful and bear true allegiance to His Majesty the Sultan and Yang Di-Pertuan...(current king's name)... and His Successors according to law. That I will without fear or favour and to the best of my ability and judgment, serve as a true and faithful member of the public service of Brunei Darussalam.

== Bulgaria ==
The members of the Bulgarian parliament, the prime minister, government ministers, the president and vice president have to swear the following oath before entering office:

Заклевам се в името на Република България да спазвам Конституцията и законите на страната и във всичките си действия да се ръководя от интересите на народа. Заклех се.

In English, "I swear in the name of the Republic of Bulgaria to observe the Constitution and the laws of the country and in all my actions to be guided by the interests of the people. This I have sworn."

The oath is dictated by the chairman of the National Assembly and a ceremony is held in the National Assembly building. When the president or the prime minister and cabinet ministers take the oath, the Constitution is also on display near the main dais during the inauguration.

During the first inauguration of Rumen Radev, the oath was uttered in several phrases until it was completed, which follows the American example for the oath of office of the president of the United States.

== Canada ==
No formal oath is required to be taken by the monarch.

=== Governor general ===
The Governor General of Canada is required to take the "Oath for the due execution of the Office of Our Governor General and Commander-in-Chief in and over Canada, and for the due impartial administration of justice", which includes swearing allegiance to the reigning Canadian monarch the viceroy is to represent. This oath must be administered by the Chief Justice of the Supreme Court of Canada or a puisne justice and, though not demanded, this is usually done during a swearing-in ceremony in the Canadian Senate chamber.

The following was the oath taken by the Governor General:

Chief Justice: Do you (name) swear that you will be faithful and bear true allegiance to His/Her Majesty King/Queen (monarch), King/Queen of Canada, His/Her heirs and successors?

Governor General: I do.

Chief Justice: So help you God. Do you swear that you will well and truly serve His/Her Majesty King/Queen (monarch) in the Office of Governor General and Commander-in Chief of Canada and duly and impartially administer justice therein?

Governor General: I do.

Chief Justice: So help you God. Do you swear that you will well and truly serve His/Her Majesty King/Queen (monarch) in the Office of Keeper of the Great Seal of Canada?

Governor General: I do.

Chief Justice: So help you God.

=== Ministers ===
All Ministers of the Crown, including the Prime Minister of Canada, must be sworn members of the King's Privy Council for Canada before taking office. The Clerk of the Privy Council administers the necessary oaths at Rideau Hall in the presence of the Governor General. The first oath taken is always the Oath of Allegiance:

I, (name), do swear (declare) that I will be faithful and bear true allegiance to His Majesty King Charles the Third, King of Canada, his heirs and successors, so help me God.

The Oath of Allegiance is followed by the Privy Council Oath:

I, (name), do solemnly and sincerely swear (declare) that I shall be a true and faithful servant to His Majesty King Charles the Third, as a member of His Majesty’s Privy Council for Canada. I will in all things to be treated, debated and resolved in Privy Council, faithfully, honestly and truly declare my mind and my opinion. I shall keep secret all matters committed and revealed to me in this capacity, or that shall be secretly treated of in Council. Generally, in all things I shall do as a faithful and true servant ought to do for His Majesty. So help me God.

Privy Councillors who are Ministers-designate, including the Prime Minister-designate, become Ministers by taking the Oath of Office, which is administered by the Clerk of the Privy Council at Rideau Hall:

I, (name), do solemnly and sincerely promise and swear (or declare) that I will truly and faithfully, and to the best of my skill and knowledge, execute the powers and trusts reposed in me as (office), so help me God.

Ministers who choose to take the oath as an affirmation use declare instead of swear and omit so help me God. After leaving Cabinet, former Ministers typically remain Privy Councillors for life, and as such retain the privilege of styling themselves "The Honourable" (or "The Right Honourable," in the case of the Prime Minister), and may use the post-nominals "P.C."

== Chile ==
The Constitution requires the president elect to swear or affirm to the Senate chairperson and the assembled Congress:

[E]l Presidente electo prestará ante el Presidente del Senado, juramento o promesa de desempeñar fielmente el cargo de Presidente de la República, conservar la independencia de la Nación, guardar y hacer guardar la Constitución y las leyes, y de inmediato asumirá sus funciones.

— Capítulo IV, Artículo 27, Constitución Política de la República de Chile

[T]he President elect will swear or promise before the Senate chairperson to faithfully fufill the office of President of the Republic, preserve the independence of the nation, keep and uphold the Constitution and the laws, and will immediately exercise their office.

— Chapter IV, Article 27, Political Constitution of the Republic of Chile

== China ==
=== Mainland China ===
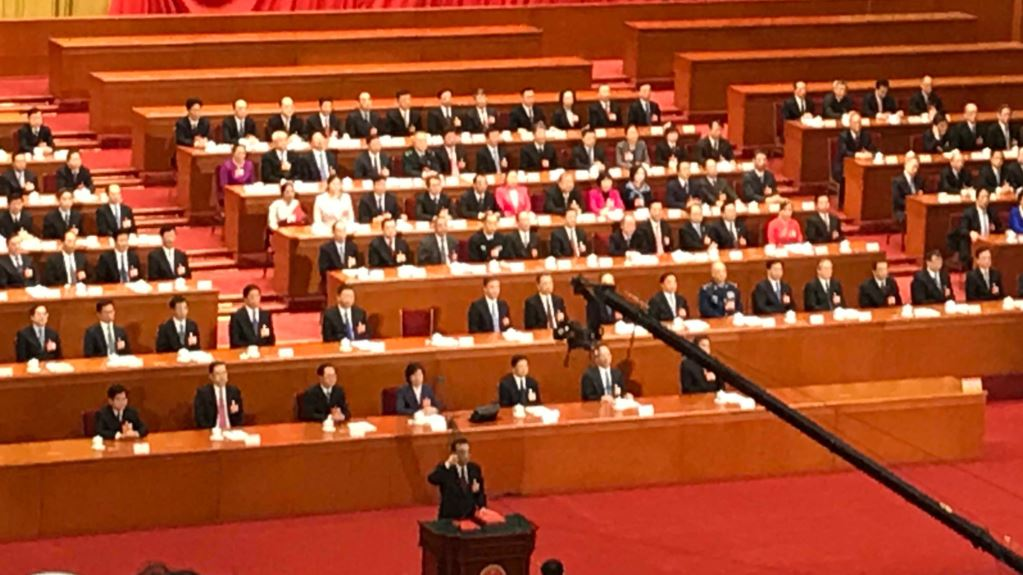
Li Keqiang publicly swore an oath to the Constitution upon formally taking office after he was appointed as the Premier in the 1st Session of the 13th National People's Congress.

On July 1, 2015, the 15th Meeting of the 12th Standing Committee of the National People's Congress passed the Decision of the National People's Congress Standing Committee Regarding the Implementation of a Constitutional Oath System, with an effective date of January 1, 2016. The decision required state civil servants elected or appointed by the National People's Congress, its Standing Committee, the State Council, the Central Military Commission, the Supreme People's Court, the Supreme People's Procuratorate, and other central government organs, as well as equivalent local government organs at or above the county level, to publicly swear an oath to the constitution upon formally taking office. The oath was then amended in 2018.

As prescribed by the decision, the oath is as follows:

Chinese: "我宣誓：忠于中华人民共和国宪法，维护宪法权威，履行法定职责，忠于祖国、忠于人民，恪尽职守、廉洁奉公，接受人民监督，为建设富强、民主、文明、和谐的社会主义国家努力奋斗！"; pinyin: Wǒ xuānshì: Zhōngyú zhōnghuá rénmín gònghéguó xiànfǎ, wéihù xiànfǎ quánwēi, lǚxíng fǎdìng zhízé, zhōngyú zǔguó, zhōngyú rénmín, kèjìnzhíshǒu, liánjié fènggōng, jiēshòu rénmín jiāndū, wèi jiànshè fùqiáng, mínzhǔ, wénmíng, héxié de shèhuì zhǔyì guójiā nǔlì fèndòu!

Unofficial English translation:

I swear to be loyal to the Constitution of the People's Republic of China, to safeguard the authority of the Constitution, to fulfill my statutory duties, to be loyal to the motherland, be loyal to the people, to be dedicated to my duties, to be honest and upright, to accept the supervision of the people, and to strive for the building of a prosperous, democratic, civilized, harmonious, and beautiful modern socialist country!

=== Hong Kong ===
The oath of office for the Chief Executive is as follows:

I, (name), swear that, in the office of Chief Executive of the Hong Kong Special Administrative Region of the People's Republic of China, I will uphold the Basic Law of the Hong Kong Special Administrative Region of the People's Republic of China, bear allegiance to the Hong Kong Special Administrative Region of the People's Republic of China and serve the Hong Kong Special Administrative Region conscientiously, dutifully, in full accordance with the law, honestly and with integrity, and be held accountable to the Central People's Government of the People's Republic of China and the Hong Kong Special Administrative Region.

本人（姓名），謹此宣誓：本人就任中華人民共和國香港特別行政區行政長官，定當擁護《中華人民共和國香港特別行政區基本法》，效忠中華人民共和國香港特別行政區，盡忠職守，遵守法律，廉潔奉公，為香港特別行政區服務，對中華人民共和國中央人民政府和香港特別行政區負責。

The oath of office for the Principal Officials is as follows:

I swear that, in the office of (office) of the Government of the Hong Kong Special Administrative Region of the People's Republic of China, I will uphold the Basic Law of the Hong Kong Special Administrative Region of the People's Republic of China, bear allegiance to the Hong Kong Special Administrative Region of the People's Republic of China and serve the Hong Kong Special Administrative Region conscientiously, dutifully, in full accordance with the law, honestly and with integrity.

我謹此宣誓：本人就任中華人民共和國香港特別行政區政府__(職務)，定當擁護《中華人民共和國香港特別行政區基本法》，效忠中華人民共和國香港特別行政區，盡忠職守，遵守法律，廉潔奉公，為香港特別行政區服務。

The oath of office for the unofficial members of the Executive Council is as follows:

I swear that, being appointed to the Executive Council of the Hong Kong Special Administrative Region of the People's Republic of China, I will uphold the Basic Law of the Hong Kong Special Administrative Region of the People's Republic of China, bear allegiance to the Hong Kong Special Administrative Region of the People's Republic of China and serve the Hong Kong Special Administrative Region conscientiously, dutifully, in full accordance with the law, honestly and with integrity.

我謹此宣誓：本人就任中華人民共和國香港特別行政區行政會議成員，定當擁護《中華人民共和國香港特別行政區基本法》，效忠中華人民共和國香港特別行政區，盡忠職守，遵守法律，廉潔奉公，為香港特別行政區服務。

The oath of office for the members of the Legislative Council is as follows:

I swear that, being a member of the Legislative Council of the Hong Kong Special Administrative Region of the People's Republic of China, I will uphold the Basic Law of the Hong Kong Special Administrative Region of the People's Republic of China, bear allegiance to the Hong Kong Special Administrative Region of the People's Republic of China and serve the Hong Kong Special Administrative Region conscientiously, dutifully, in full accordance with the law, honestly and with integrity.

我謹此宣誓：本人就任中華人民共和國香港特別行政區立法會議員，定當擁護《中華人民共和國香港特別行政區基本法》，效忠中華人民共和國香港特別行政區，盡忠職守，遵守法律，廉潔奉公，為香港特別行政區服務。

The oath of office of judges is as follows:

I swear that, in the Office of a Judge of the Judiciary of the Hong Kong Special Administrative Region of the People's Republic of China, I will uphold the Basic Law of the Hong Kong Special Administrative Region of the People's Republic of China, bear allegiance to the Hong Kong Special Administrative Region of the People's Republic of China, serve the Hong Kong Special Administrative Region conscientiously, dutifully, in full accordance with the law, honestly and with integrity, safeguard the law and administer justice without fear or favour, self-interest or deceit.

我謹此宣誓：本人就任中華人民共和國香港特別行政區法院法官/司法人員，定當擁護《中華人民共和國香港特別行政區基本法》，效忠中華人民共和國香港特別行政區，盡忠職守，奉公守法，公正廉潔，以無懼、無偏、無私、無欺之精神，維護法制，主持正義，為香港特別行政區服務。

During the colonial era, the Governors of Hong Kong were required by Hong Kong Royal Instructions and Hong Kong Letters Patent to take the Oath of Allegiance, the Official Oath and the Judicial Oath of the United Kingdom before assuming the office.

=== Macau ===
The oath of office for the Chief Executive is as follows:

I, (name), hereby take the oath, and assume the office of the Chief Executive of the Macau Special Administrative Region of the People's Republic of China, I will uphold and Implement the Basic Law of Macau Special Administrative Region of the People’s Republic of China, I will bear allegiance to the People's Republic of China and Macau Special Administrative Region, I will dedicate and abide the law, be honest, to make every effort to maintain and protect Macau’s stability and development, and make myself accountable to the Macau Special Administrative Region and the Central Government. This is my solemn oath.

== Costa Rica ==
In Costa Rica, the oath of office is administered to the President-elect on Inauguration Day, and to all other public officials on the day of the undertaking of their duties. The oath of office for the President of Costa Rica is administered to him, or her, by the President of the Asamblea Legislativa de Costa Rica. It is established in the Political Constitution of the Republic of Costa Rica (Article 194):

"El juramento que deben prestar los funcionarios públicos, según lo dispuesto en el artículo 11 de esta Constitución es el siguiente:

-¿Juráis a Dios y prometéis a la Patria, observar y defender la Constitución y las leyes de la República, y cumplir fielmente los deberes de vuestro destino? -Sí, juro-.

-Si así lo hiciereis, Dios os ayude, y si no, Él y la Patria os lo demanden."

(Do you swear before God and promise the Country to observe and defend the Constitution and the laws of the Republic and faithfully fulfill the duties of your office?

Yes, I swear.

If you do, may God help you, and if you do not, may He and the Country call you to account.)

== Croatia ==
Before assuming duty, the President-elect of the Republic takes oath of office before the judges of the Constitutional Court swearing loyalty to the Constitution:

I solemnly swear to perform the duty of the President of the Republic of Croatia conscientiously and responsibly, to the benefit of the Croatian people and all Croatian citizens. As a Head of the Croatian State, I will keep the Constitution and laws, care for the respect of the Constitutional order of the Republic of Croatia, cherish proper and fair action of all bodies of state authority and keep the independence, existence and unity of the Croatian State. So help me God!

== Egypt ==
Before assuming duty, the President-elect of the Republic and the ministers takes oath of office:

I swear by Almighty God to uphold the Republican system, to respect the Constitution and the law, to fully safeguard the interests of the people and to protect the independence of the nation and its territorial integrity

== Fiji ==
In Fiji, the oath of office for the President of Fiji and Vice-President of Fiji are set out in Chapter 17 of the Constitution of Fiji.

Individuals taking the oath proclaim to be "faithful" to the republic, and faithful "according to law." The oath ends with the statement "So help me God!"

=== Oath of Allegiance ===
==== President ====
I, (name), being appointed/elected President, do swear that I will be faithful and bear true allegiance to the Republic of Fiji, according to law. So Help me God.

==== Prime Minister and other Officials ====
I, (name), do swear that I will be faithful and bear true allegiance to the Republic of Fiji according to law, and that I will obey, observe, uphold, and maintain the constitution of the Republic of Fiji. So Help me God.

=== Oath of Execution ===
==== President ====
I, (name), being appointed/elected President, do swear that I will well and truly serve the Republic of Fiji in the Office of the President. So Help me God.

==== Prime Minister and other officials ====
I, (name), being appointed/elected as (position), swear that I will be faithful and true allegiance to the Republic of Fiji, that I will obey, observe, uphold, and maintain the constitution of the Republic of Fiji and all other laws of Fiji, and I will solemnly and sincerely promise to hold my office with honor, dignity, and integrity; to be a true and faithful counselor, not to divulge any secret matter entrusted to me, and to perform the functions of my office consciously and to the best of my ability. So Help me God.

== Finland ==
=== General oath of office. ===
In Finland, the oath of office is sworn by

- The Chancellor of Justice and the Assistant Chancellor of Justice
- The chief of staff (Finnish: kansliapäällikkö) of the office of the President of Finland,
- the following officials of the Finnish Government, the office of the Chancellor of Justice or of any government ministry:
  - heads of office (Finnish: kansliapäällikkö)
  - the secretaries and under-secretaries of state (Finnish: valtiosihteeri, alivaltiosihteeri)
  - heads of section (Finnish: osastopäällikkö)
- heads of central agencies
- provincial governors
- heads of diplomatic or consular missions
- all career military personnel of Finnish Defence Forces and the Finnish Border Guard
- prison governors

The oath of office is:

I, (name), promise and swear before almighty and all-knowing God that I will, in the fulfilment of my office, follow the constitution and other laws, acting rightfully and impartially for the sake of the citizens and the society.

Those who do not want to swear the religious oath may give an affirmation. In this case, the words "promise and swear before almighty and all-knowing God" are replaced by "promise and affirm by my honor and by my conscience".

Policemen and some other persons executing justice make a written affirmation of office instead of an oath. The text of the affirmation is

I, (name), promise and affirm by my honour and by my conscience that I will, in the fulfillment of my office, follow the constitution and other laws, acting rightfully and impartially. I will fulfill my duties carefully and as well as I can. Furthermore, I will not divulge to third parties knowledge which I have gained in my office, and which must be kept secret.

In Finnish practice, the oaths of office are given only once. If the person who has given an oath or affirmation moves to another duty where such oath is required, the oath is not given anew.

=== Presidential affirmation of office ===
The President of Finland gives the following affirmation of office:

I, (name), elected by the people of Finland as the President of the Republic, hereby affirm that in my presidential duties I shall sincerely and conscientiously observe the Constitution and the laws of the Republic, and to the best of my ability promote the wellbeing of the people of Finland.

=== Oath of judges ===
Finnish judges and justices of all courts are required to give the following oath:

I, (name), do promise and swear by God and His Holy Gospels that to the best of my understanding and conscience I wish to and shall in all judgments render justice to poor and rich alike and render judgment in accordance with the laws and lawful rules of God and country: I shall never, under any pretext, pervert the law nor promote injustice because of kinship, relationship, friendship, envy, hatred or fear, or for the sake of gifts or presents or other reasons, nor shall I find an innocent person guilty or a guilty person innocent. Furthermore, I shall not, before pronouncing a judgment or thereafter, reveal to the parties or to anyone else anything about the deliberations that the Court has held behind closed doors. All of this I wish to and shall fulfil faithfully, honestly and as an earnest judge, without deceit and intrigue, so help me God, in body and mind.

Those taking an affirmation do not use the parts involving God.

All Finnish cabinet ministers are required to give both the general oath or affirmation of office and the oath of judge, unless they have given these oaths and affirmations before. Like the general oath of office, the oath of judge is given only once.

=== Military oath ===
All Finnish conscripts are required to give the military oath or affirmation. The oath or affirmation is given in the end of the basic training using the formula:

I, (name), promise and affirm before the almighty and all-knowing God (in affirmation: by my honour and by my conscience) that I am a trustworthy and faithful citizen of the realm of Finland. I want to serve my country honestly and, to my best ability, seek and pursue her edification and advantage.

I want everywhere and in every situation, during the peace and during the war, defend the inviolability of my fatherland, her legal system of government and the legal authority of the realm. If I perceive or gain knowledge of activity to overthrow the legal authority or to subvert the system of government of the country, I want to report it to the authorities without delay. The troop to which I belong and my place in it I will not desert in any situation, but so long as I have strength in me, I will completely fulfill the task I have received. I promise to act properly and uprightly, obey my superiors, comply with the laws and decrees and keep the service secrets trusted in me. I want to be forthright and helpful to my fellow servicemen. Never will I due to kinship, friendship, envy, hatred or fear nor because of gifts or any other reason act contrary to my duty in service.

If I be given a position of superiority, I want to be rightful to my subordinates, to take care of their wellbeing, acquire information on their wishes, to be their councillor and guide and, for my own self, set them a good and encouraging example. All this I want to fulfil according to my honour and my conscience.

== Germany ==
The oath of office of the Federal President, Federal Chancellor, and other federal ministers in Germany is as follows:

Ich schwöre, daß ich meine Kraft dem Wohle des deutschen Volkes widmen, seinen Nutzen mehren, Schaden von ihm wenden, das Grundgesetz und die Gesetze des Bundes wahren und verteidigen, meine Pflichten gewissenhaft erfüllen und Gerechtigkeit gegen jedermann üben werde. So wahr mir Gott helfe.

I swear that I will dedicate my efforts to the well-being of the German people, promote their welfare, protect them from harm, uphold and defend the Basic Law and the laws of the Federation, perform my duties conscientiously, and do justice to all. So help me God.

The religious affirmation may be omitted. The first chancellor to do this was Gerhard Schröder in 1998, the second was Olaf Scholz in 2021.

Each of the 16 Länder (states) has its own oath of office for the Minister Presidents and other ministers, also for the Länder employees.

The oath for soldiers in Germany reads as follows:

I swear to serve loyally the Federal Republic of Germany and to defend bravely the right and the freedom of the German people. So help me God.

Conscripts say "vow" instead of "swear", and the religious affirmation is not added for conscripts since the vow is not an actual oath.

The oath for federal Beamte:

I swear to protect the Basic Law for the Federal Republic of Germany and all valid laws within the Federal Republic and to fulfill my duties of the office faithfully, so help me God.

The oath for federal judges according to § 38 DRiG is as follows: (State (Länder) judges may have to add a commitment to the state constitution (Landesverfassung) to their oath)

I swear to exercise judicial office in conformity with the Basic Law of the Federal Republic of Germany and with the law, to adjudicate to the best of my knowledge and belief, without distinction of person, and to serve the cause of truth and justice alone – so help me God.

== Ghana ==
The oath of office of the President of Ghana is as follows:

I, (name), having been elected to the high office of President of the Republic of Ghana do in the name of the Almighty God swear (or do solemnly affirm) that I will be faithful and true to the Republic of Ghana; that I will at all times preserve, protect and defend the Constitution of the Republic of Ghana; and that I dedicate myself to the service and well-being of the people of the Republic of Ghana and to do right to all manner of persons. I further solemnly swear (or solemnly affirm) that should I at any time break this oath of office I shall submit myself to the laws of the Republic of Ghana and suffer the penalty for it. (So help me God)

For members of the Parliament of Ghana, the oath is:

I, (name), having been elected a member of Parliament do in the name of the Almighty God swear (or do solemnly affirm) that I will bear true faith and allegiance to the Republic of Ghana as by law established; that I will uphold, preserve, protect and defend the Constitution of the Republic of Ghana; and that I will faithfully and conscientiously discharge the duties of a member of Parliament. (So help me God)

== Greece ==
Article 59 of the Constitution of Greece states that members of parliament must take the following oath:

Oρκίζομαι στο όνομα της Aγίας και Oμοούσιας και Aδιαίρετης Τριάδας να είμαι πιστός στην Πατρίδα και το δημοκρατικό πολίτευμα, να υπακούω στο Σύνταγμα και τους νόμους και να εκπληρώνω ευσυνείδητα τα καθήκοντά μου.

I swear in the name of the Holy Consubstantial and Indivisible Trinity to keep faith in my Country and in the democratic form of government, obedience to the Constitution and the laws and to discharge conscientiously my duties.

Article 33 of the Constitution of Greece states that the President of the Hellenic Republic must take the following oath:

Ορκίζομαι στο όνομα της Aγίας και Oμοούσιας και Aδιαίρετης Τριάδας να φυλάσσω το Σύνταγμα και τους νόμους, να μεριμνώ για την πιστή τους τήρηση, να υπερασπίζω την εθνική ανεξαρτησία και την ακεραιότητα της Xώρας, να προστατεύω τα δικαιώματα και τις ελευθερίες των Ελλήνων και να υπηρετώ το γενικό συμφέρον και την πρόοδο του Ελληνικού Λαού.

I swear in the name of the Holy, Consubstantial and Indivisible Trinity to safeguard the Constitution and the laws, to ensure their faithful observance, to defend the national independence and territorial integrity of the Country, to protect the rights and liberties of the Greeks and to serve the general interest and the progress of the Greek People.

== Guatemala ==
Article 181 of the Guatemalan Constitution provides that the incoming president of Guatemala should raises his or her right arm up to shoulder-level before the President of the Congress of Guatemala and say the following oath of office in Spanish:

I promise to make and to keep the political constitution of the Republic of Guatemala and the laws that came from it, and loyally and faithfully love to my country the position of President of the Republic that the public has given me legally and legitimate, looking above all for the good and the prosperity of the country so help me God; and if I don't do it as such that the nation should demand it from me.

Afterwards, the outgoing President passes him the Presidential Sash (the Banda Presidential), which is worn from the left shoulder to the right rib, to the new president along with the presidential pin and with the Constitutional Collar.

== India ==
=== President of India ===
The oath of office for the President of India is as follows:

I, (name), do swear in the name of God (or, solemnly affirm) that I will faithfully execute the office of President of India, and will do the best of my ability preserve, protect and defend the Constitution and the law, and that I will devote myself to the service and well-being of the people of Republic of India.

— Article 60, Constitution of India

Oath of office of President of India in Hindi Version

मैं, (अमुक), ईश्वर की शपथ लेता हूँ (सत्यनिष्ठा से प्रतिज्ञान करता हूँ) कि मैं श्रद्धापूर्वक भारत के राष्ट्रपति के पद का कार्यपालन (अथवा राष्ट्रपति के कृत्यों का निर्वहन) करूँगा, तथा अपनी पूरी योग्यता से संविधान और विधि का परिरक्षण, संरक्षण और प्रतिरक्षण करूँगा, और मैं भारत की जनता की सेवा और कल्याण में निरत रहूँगा।

— अनुच्‍छेद 60, भारत का संविधान

=== Vice President of India ===
The oath of office for the Vice President of India is as follows:

I, (name), do swear in the name of God (or, solemnly affirm) that I will bear true faith and allegiance to the Constitution of India as by law established, and that I will faithfully discharge the duty upon which I am about to enter.

— Article 69, Constitution of India

Oath of office of Vice President of India in Hindi Version

मैं, (अमुक), ईश्वर की शपथ लेता हूँ (सत्यनिष्ठा से प्रतिज्ञान करता हूँ) कि मैं विधि द्वारा स्थापित भारत के संविधान के प्रति सच्ची श्रद्धा और निष्ठा रखूँगा, तथा जिस पद को मैं ग्रहण करने वाला हूँ उसके कर्तव्यों का श्रद्धापूर्वक निर्वहन करूँगा।

— अनुच्‍छेद 69, भारत का संविधान

=== Prime Minister of India and the union ministers of India ===
The oath of office for Prime Minister of India and other members of the Union Council of Ministers:

The oath of office is as follows:

I, (name), do swear in the name of God (or, solemnly affirm) that I will bear true faith and allegiance to the Constitution of India as by law established, that I will uphold the sovereignty and integrity of India, that I will faithfully and conscientiously discharge my duties as a Prime Minister (or, Minister) for the Union and that I will do right to all manner of people in accordance with the Constitution and the law, without fear or favour, afection or ill-will.

— Schedule III, Constitution of India

oath of office of Prime Minister of India and Union Council of Ministers In Hindi Version

'मैं, (अमुक), ईश्वर की शपथ लेता हूँ (सत्यनिष्ठा से प्रतिज्ञान करता हूँ) कि मैं विधि द्वारा स्थापित भारत के संविधान के प्रति सच्ची श्रद्धा और निष्ठा रखूँगा, मैं भारत की प्रभुता और अखंडता अक्षुण्ण रखूँगा, मैं संघ के प्रधानमंत्री (या, मंत्री) के रूप में अपने कर्तव्यों का श्रद्धापूर्वक और शुद्ध अंतःकरण से निर्वहन करूँगा तथा मैं भय या पक्षपात, अनुराग या द्वेष के बिना, सभी प्रकार के लोगों के प्रति संविधान और विधि के अनुसार न्याय करूँगा।'

— तीसरी अनुसूची, भारत का संविधान

The oath of secrecy is as follows:

I, (name), do swear in the name of God (or, solemnly affirm) that I will not directly or indirectly communicate or reveal to any person or persons any matter which shall be brought under my consideration, or shall become known to me as a Prime Minister (or, Minister) for the Union, except as may be required for the due discharge of my duties as Prime Minister (or, Such Minister).

— Schedule III, Constitution of India

Oath of Secrecy in Hindi Version

'मैं, (अमुक), ईश्वर की शपथ लेता हूँ (सत्यनिष्ठा से प्रतिज्ञान करता हूँ) कि जो विषय संघ के प्रधानमंत्री (या, मंत्री) के रूप में मेरे विचार के लिए लाया जाएगा अथवा मुझे ज्ञात होगा उसे किसी व्यक्ति या व्यक्तियों को, तब के सिवाय जबकि प्रधानमंत्री (या, ऐसे मंत्री) के रूप में अपने कर्तव्यों के सम्यक्‌ निर्वहन के लिए ऐसा करना अपेक्षित हो, मैं प्रत्यक्ष अथवा अप्रत्यक्ष रूप से संसूचित या प्रकट नहीं करूँगा।'

— तीसरी अनुसूची, भारत का संविधान

=== Chief Justice of India and judges of the Supreme Court of India ===
The oath of office for Chief Justice of India and the judges of Supreme Court of India is as follows:

I, (name), having been appointed Chief Justice (or, a Judge) of the Supreme Court of India, do swear in the name of God (or, affirm) that I will bear true faith and allegiance to the Constitution of India as by law established, that I will uphold the sovereignty and integrity of India, that I will duly and faithfully and to the best of my ability, knowledge and judgment perform the duties of my office without fear or favour, affection or ill-will and that I will uphold the Constitution and the laws.

— Schedule III, Constitution of India

Oath of office of Chief Justice of India and judges of Supreme court in Hindi Version

'मैं, (अमुक), जो भारत के उच्चतम न्यायालय का मुख्य न्यायमूर्ति (या, न्यायाधीश) नियुक्त हुआ हूँ, ईश्वर की शपथ लेता हूँ (सत्यनिष्ठा से प्रतिज्ञान करता हूँ) कि मैं विधि द्वारा स्थापित भारत के संविधान के प्रति सच्ची श्रद्धा और निष्ठा रखूँगा, मैं भारत की प्रभुता और अखंडता अक्षुण्ण रखूँगा, तथा मैं सम्यक्‌ प्रकार से और श्रद्धापूर्वक तथा अपनी पूरी योग्यता, ज्ञान और विवेक से अपने पद के कर्तव्यों का भय या पक्षपात, अनुराग या द्वेष के बिना पालन करूँगा तथा मैं संविधान और विधियों की मर्यादा बनाए रखूँगा।'

— तीसरी अनुसूची, भारत का संविधान

=== Oath as the state chief minister ===
The chief minister serves five years in the office. The following is the oath of the chief minister of state:

I, <Name of Chief Minister>, do swear in the name of God/solemnly affirm that I will bear true faith and allegiance to the Constitution of India as by law established, that I will uphold the sovereignty and integrity of India, that I will faithfully and conscientiously discharge my duties as a Minister for the State of () and that I will do right to all manner of people in accordance with the Constitution and the law without fear or favour, affection or ill-will.

== Indonesia ==
=== President and Vice President ===
Based on Article 9 of the 1945 Constitution of the Republic of Indonesia about the Oath and Promise of Office of the president and vice president:

Before assuming office, the president and the vice president shall take the oath of office according to their religions, or solemnly promise before the People's Consultative Assembly (MPR) or the House of Representatives (DPR) session as follows:

The Presidential/Vice-presidential Oath of Office (for Muslims):

Indonesian: Demi Allah saya bersumpah akan memenuhi kewajiban Presiden (Wakil Presiden) Republik Indonesia dengan sebaik-baiknya dan seadil-adilnya; memegang teguh Undang-Undang Dasar dan menjalankan segala undang-undang serta peraturannya dengan selurus-lurusnya; serta berbakti kepada Nusa dan Bangsa.

In the name of Allah, I swear that I will perform the duties of the President (or Vice President) of the Republic of Indonesia to the best of my ability and as justly as possible, and that I will strictly observe the Constitution and consistently implement the law and regulations in the service of the country and the people.

The Presidential/Vice-presidential Promise:

Indonesian: Saya berjanji dengan sungguh-sungguh akan memenuhi kewajiban Presiden (Wakil Presiden) Republik Indonesia dengan sebaik-baiknya dan seadil-adilnya; memegang teguh Undang-Undang Dasar dan menjalankan segala undang-undang serta peraturannya dengan selurus-lurusnya; serta berbakti kepada Nusa dan Bangsa.

I solemnly promise that I will perform the duties of the President (or Vice President) of the Republic of Indonesia to the best of my ability and as justly as possible, and that I will strictly observe the constitution and consistently implement the law and regulations in the service of the country and the people.

In case any sessions can not be held, like one in 1998 when the protesters took control of the parliament building, the oath can be performed before the MPR speaker and deputy speakers, with presence of the Chief Justice and his/her deputies.

=== Cabinet members and Presidential Work Units (UKP) ===
In the name of Allah (for Muslims) or Om Atah Paramawisesa (for Hindus) or In the name of Sanghyang Adi Buddha (for Buddhists) I swear (or in the name of God I promise (for Protestants and Catholics) or I swear to the Great God of Heaven with all my soul (for Confucians)) that I will be faithful to the Constitution of Indonesia, and will execute any laws consistently for my service to the nation and the country. That I, when executing the duties of this office, will highly honor office ethics, perform to the best of my ability, and with full responsibility. That I will maintain my integrity, never abuse my power, and avert myself from despicable actions. (for Protestants and Catholics: So help me God.) (for Hindus: Om Shanti Shanti Shanti Om.) (for Buddhists: Sadhu Sadhu Sadhu.) (for Confucians: May the God of Heaven help me fulfill this vow, and grant me His virtue. Shanzai.)

In the past, between the pronunciation of God according to each religions and "so help me God" expression, the oath was as follows (before the second and third sentence, they will be started with "I swear", regardless of the religions):

that I, being appointed to this office, directly or indirectly, by any name or excuse, will not grant or promise or give something to anyone. That I, for doing or not doing something, will never receive from anyone, directly or indirectly, any promise or givings. That I, will be faithful to the Constitution and will preserve any laws and rulings that valid for the state of the Republic of Indonesia. That I, with all my strength, will seek the welfare of the Republic of Indonesia. That I will be faithful to the people and the country, and will fulfill any obligations that were passed on me because of this office. That I will execute the duties and obligations with full responsibility to the people and the country.

To refer the god for Hindus, the oath used to use sentence "In the name of Sang Hyang Widhi", and later "Om Swastiastu". There was also a time when Protestant and Catholic ministers said "I swear" instead of promise at the beginning of the oath, only refer God in the last sentence. The verses "to seek the welfare" was removed since it reflected the dictatorial New Order era.

=== Armed Forces/Police oath of commissioning/enlistment ===
For officers:

In the name of Allah (for Muslims) or Om Atah Paramawisesa (for Hindus) or In the name of Sanghyang Adi Buddha (for Buddhists) I swear (or in the name of God I promise (for Protestants and Catholics)) that with the best of my ability for the unitary nation and people of Indonesia, living the spirit of Pancasila and in obedience to the 1945 Constitution, serve the duties of an officer of the National Armed Forces/National Police. That I will uphold the dignity and honor of an officer and thus remain faithful to (for officers of the National Armed Forces: the Armed Forces Pledge and our Oath of Service; for officers of the National Police: the Police Pledge and our Constables' Oath) That I thus will be responsible for my subordinates by becoming an example, building morale and confidence, and making right and honest decisions, and that I will, for the sake of the nation and people, will be prepared to sacrifice my body and spirit. (for Christians and Catholics: So help me God.) (for Hindus: Om Shanti Shanti Shanti Om.) (for Buddhists: Sadhu Sadhu Sadhu.)

For enlisted personnel of the Armed Forces and new cadets to the military academies and the Army Officer Candidate School:

In the name of Allah (for Muslims) or Om Atah Paramawisesa (for Hindus) or In the name of Sanghyang Adi Buddha (for Buddhists) I swear (or in the name of God I promise (for Protestants and Catholics)) that with the best of my ability serve with loyalty the unitary nation and people of Indonesia on the basis of Pancasila and the 1945 Constitution. That I will be faithful to the laws and regulations placed upon me and to uphold military discipline. That I will do my best to obey any orders issued by our superiors. That I thus, to the nation and the National Armed Forces, will carry out all obligations with full responsibility. And that I will as long as I can do maintain the secrecy of the National Armed Forces. (for Christians and Catholics: So help me God.) (for Hindus: Om Shanti Shanti Shanti Om.) (for Buddhists: Sadhu Sadhu Sadhu.)

== Iran ==
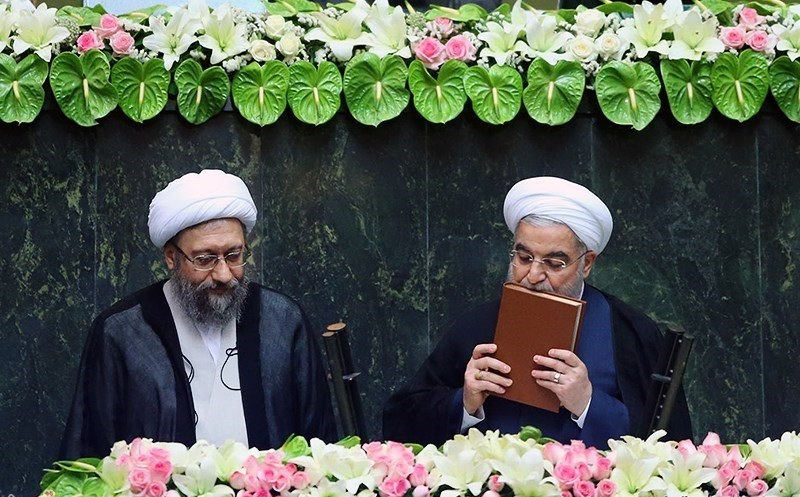
Hassan Rouhani takes the oath of office as the President of Iran.

The oath of office for the President of Iran is as follows:

I, as the President, upon the Holy Qur'an and in the presence of the Iranian nation, do hereby swear in the name of Almighty God to safeguard the official Faith, the system of the Islamic republic and the Constitution of the country; to use all my talents and abilities in the discharge of responsibilities undertaken by me; to devote myself to the service of the people, glory of the country, promotion of religion and morality, support of right and propagation of justice; to refrain from being autocratic; to protect the freedom and dignity of individuals and the rights of the Nation recognized by the Constitution; to spare no efforts in safeguarding the frontiers and the political, economic and cultural freedoms of the country; to guard the power entrusted to me by the Nation as a sacred trust like an honest and faithful trustee, by seeking help from God and following the example of the Prophet of Islam and the sacred Imams, peace be upon them, and to entrust it to the one elected by the Nation after me.

— Constitution of the Islamic Republic of Iran, https://www.refworld.org/docid/3ae6b56710.html#:~:text=I%2C%20as%20President,elect%20after%20me.

For members of the Majlis of Iran, the oath is as follows:

In the presence of the Holy Qur'an I swear to God Almighty and undertake upon my human dignity to protect the sanctity of Islam and safeguard the achievements of the Islamic Revolution of Iranian people and the essentials of the Islamic Republic, to uphold the trust placed in us by the Nation as a just trustee, to observe piety and honesty in the discharge of my functions as a representative of the people, to remain always faithful and true to the independence and dignity of the country, protection of rights of the Nation and service to people, to defend the Constitution, and to uphold the independence of the country and the freedom and interests of the people in words, writings and comments.

— National Legislative Bodies / National Authorities, Constitution of the Islamic Republic of Iran, https://www.refworld.org/docid/3ae6b56710.html#:~:text=In%20the%20presence,session%20they%20attend.

According to the Iranian Constitution, MPs belonging to religious minorities may swear by the holy books of their respective faiths.

Oath of Judge Iranian judges of all courts are required to give the following oath:

In the name of God, the Merciful, the Compassionate
Oath letter
I, as a judge, in the presence of the Holy Qur'an and before Iranian nation, swear to omnipotent God to follow the Prophet of Islam and the sacred Imams, peace be upon them, and seeking help of the spirits of the martyrs of Islam, guard justice and righteous, and undertake upon my human dignity to be diligent in seeking the truth and justice, administer Islamic justice to demand from oppressor and restore it to its owner and with sustained effort in Judicial position fulfill my obligation to Islamic republic with strengthening the foundations of the Islamic republic and supporting The Leader.
Name and surname
Signature

— Ruhollah Khomeini, Iranian Constitution, Article 67 of the Constitution of the Islamic Republic of Iran

== Ireland ==
The Constitution of Ireland specifies, for each of three offices, a "declaration" which the holder must "make and subscribe" before taking office.

Office	Declaration: In the presence of Almighty God I, (name), do solemnly and sincerely promise and declare that I will...
President	...maintain the Constitution of Ireland and uphold its laws, that I will fulfil my duties faithfully and conscientiously in accordance with the Constitution and the law, and that I will dedicate my abilities to the service and welfare of the people of Ireland. May God direct and sustain me.
Member of the Council of State	...faithfully and conscientiously fulfil my duties as a member of the Council of State.
Judge	...duly and faithfully and to the best of my knowledge and power execute the office of (office) without fear or favour, affection or ill-will towards any man, and that I will uphold the Constitution and the laws. May God direct and sustain me.

The declarations' references to God were criticised in a 1993 report of the United Nations Human Rights Committee. The 1996 Constitution Review Group proposed that the President and members of the Council of State should be permitted to substitute a non-religious affirmation. In contrast, it recommended a uniform non-religious oath for all judges, on the basis that impartiality was more central to the judicial function and would be compromised by providing a choice of words.

The "solemn declaration" for members of the Garda Síochána was revised in 2005. Its reference to God may be omitted. Members pledge not to "belong to or subscribe to, any political party or secret society whatsoever". In the Defence Forces, the "Oath or Declaration" differs between permanent and reserve forces, and between commissioned officers and enlisted members. The wording makes no reference to God; it was changed in 1979 when women were first admitted.

Members of the Oireachtas and of the Government do not make any oath. From the foundation of the Irish Free State in 1922, both had to make an oath of allegiance to the Constitution and of fidelity to King George V. This controversial provision of the 1921 Anglo-Irish Treaty contributed to the Civil War of 1922–23. The Oath was abolished by Fianna Fáil in 1932–33. Since then, Oireachtas members are required by standing orders to sign the roll before first taking their seats. The Governor-General of the Irish Free State took the same Oath of Allegiance and Oath of Office as the Governor General of Canada. This did not take place in public.

== Israel ==
In Israel, the Basic Laws specify oaths of office of high-ranking members of the government.

For the President of Israel, there is a "Declaration of Loyalty":

I pledge to maintain loyalty to the State of Israel and to its laws and to faithfully fulfill my duties as President of the State.

In the Knesset, the oath of office (or "declaration of allegiance") is as follows:

Oldest member of Knesset or chairperson: I pledge myself to bear allegiance to the State of Israel and faithfully to discharge my mandate in the Knesset.

Each other member of the Knesset, in turn: I pledge myself.

The Prime Minister of Israel has to make the following "declaration of allegiance" upon taking office:

I, (name), pledge myself as Prime Minister to bear allegiance to the State of Israel and to its laws, to carry out faithfully my functions as Prime Minister and to comply with the decisions of the Knesset.

Each of the other Ministers has to swear:

I, (name), pledge myself as a member of the Government to bear allegiance to the State of Israel and to its laws, to carry out faithfully my functions as a member of the Government and to comply with the decisions of the Knesset.

For judges, the oath of office (or "declaration of allegiance") is as follows:

I pledge myself to keep allegiance to the State of Israel and its laws, to administer justice fairly, to avoid subverting justice, and to avoid demonstrating favor.

== Italy ==
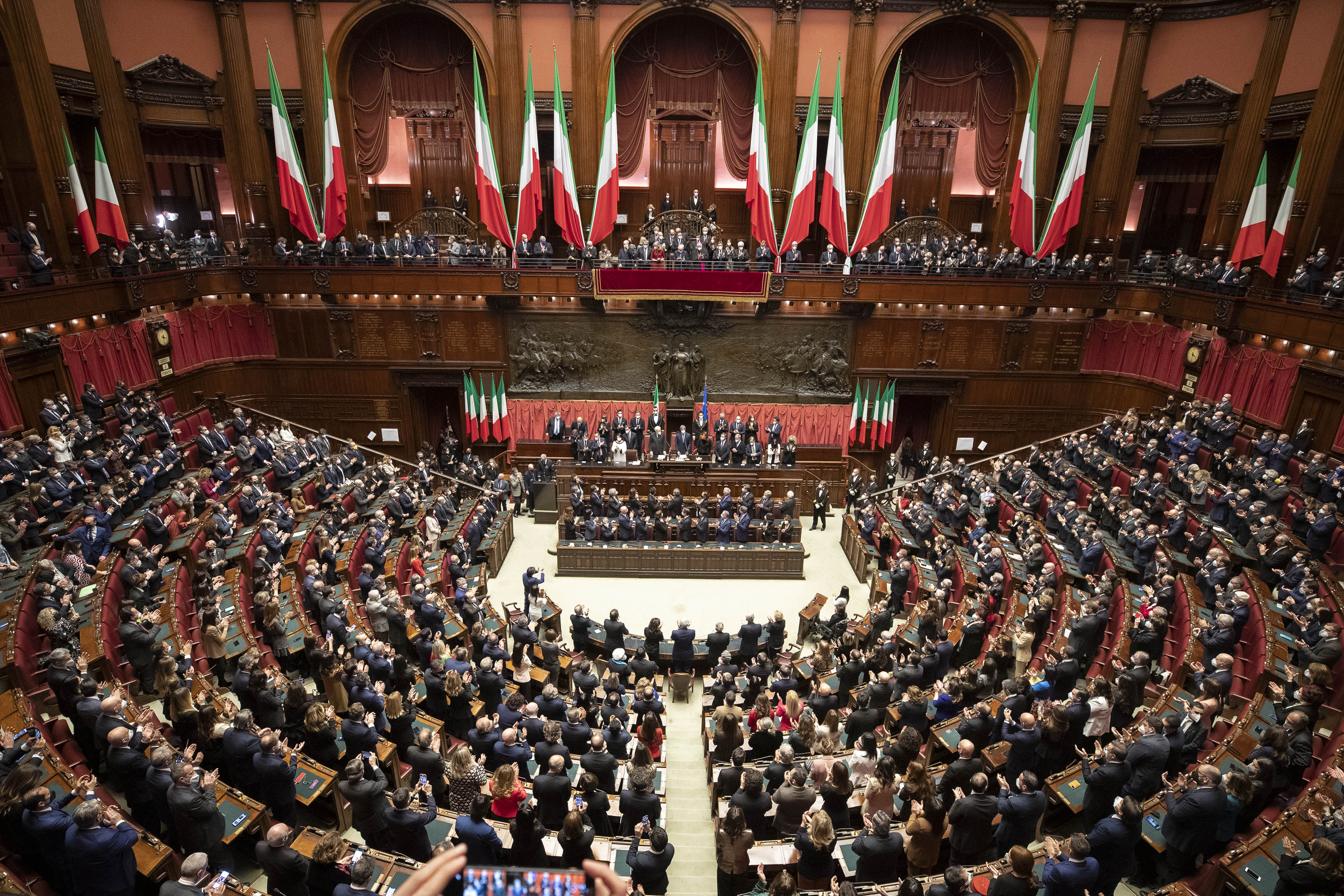
Second presidential inauguration of Sergio Mattarella.

In Italy, before taking office, the President is required by Article 91 of the Constitution to take an oath of allegiance to the Republic and swear to uphold the Constitution before Parliament in joint session. The oath of office of the President is the following:

Giuro di essere fedele alla Repubblica e di osservarne lealmente la Costituzione.

I swear to be faithful to the Republic and to loyally observe its Constitution.

Also, Article 54 of the Constitution requires public officials to fulfil their functions with discipline and honour, taking an oath to that effect in those cases established by the law. The Prime Minister and members of the Council are sworn in by the President with the following oath of office:

Giuro di essere fedele alla Repubblica, di osservarne lealmente la Costituzione e le leggi, e di esercitare le mie funzioni nell'interesse esclusivo della Nazione.

I swear to be faithful to the Republic, to loyally observe its Constitution and laws, and to exercise my functions in the exclusive interest of the Nation.

== South Korea ==
In South Korea, before taking office, the President is required by Article 67 of the Constitution. As prescribed by the decision, the oath is as follows:

나는 헌법을 준수하고 국가를 보위하며 조국의 평화적 통일과 국민의 자유와 복리의 증진 및 민족문화의 창달에 노력하여 대통령으로서의 직책을 성실히 수행할 것을 국민 앞에 엄숙히 선서합니다.

Unofficial English translation:

I do solemnly swear before the people that I will faithfully execute the duties as President by observing the Constitution, defending the state, pursuing the peaceful unification of the homeland, promoting the freedom and welfare of the people, and endeavoring to develop the national culture. (Date) President (name).

== Lebanon ==
In Lebanon, the president must take the following oath before the Parliament:

I swear by Almighty God to observe the Constitution and the Laws of the Lebanese Nation and to maintain the independence of Lebanon and its territorial integrity.

== Luxembourg ==
Articles 57 through 59 of the Constitution of Luxembourg prescribe the following oath, to be pronounced before the Chamber of Deputies for a new Grand Duke, Regent or Lieutenant-Representant of the Grand Duke:

French: Je jure d’observer la Constitution et les lois et de remplir fidèlement mes attributions constitutionnelles.

German: Ich schwöre, die Verfassung und die Gesetze zu beachten und meine verfassungsmäßigen Pflichten getreu zu erfüllen.

Luxembourgish: Ech schwieren d'Verfassung an d'Gesetzer ze beobachten a meng konstitutionell Flichte trei ze erfëllen.

In English: I swear to observe the Constitution and laws and to faithfully fulfill my constitutional attributions.

Members of the Chamber of Deputies and of the Government take the following oath upon taking office:

French: Je jure d’observer la Constitution et les lois et de remplir ma fonction avec intégrité, exactitude et impartialité.

German: Ich schwöre, die Verfassung und die Gesetze zu beachten und meine Funktion mit Integrität, Genauigkeit und Unparteilichkeit zu erfüllen.

Luxembourgish: Ech schwieren d'Verfassung an d'Gesetzer ze beobachten a meng Funktioun mat Integritéit, Genauegkeet an Onparteilechkeet ze erfëllen.

In English: I swear to observe the Constitution and laws and to fulfill my position with integrity, accuracy and impartiality.

Until the 2023 constitutional revision, this oath was:

French: Je jure fidélité au Grand-Duc, obéissance à la Constitution et aux lois de l'État.

German: Ich schwöre dem Großherzog Treue und Gehorsam gegenüber der Verfassung und den Gesetzen des Staates.

Luxembourgish: Ech schwieren dem Grand-Duc Loyalitéit, dem Gehorsam un der Verfassung an de Gesetzer vum Staat.

In English: I swear loyalty to the Grand Duke, obedience to the Constitution and to the laws of the State.

== Malaysia ==
=== Yang di-Pertuan Agong and Deputy Yang di-Pertuan Agong ===
Article 37 of the Federal Constitution requires the Yang di-Pertuan Agong (King) and his deputy to take the Oath of Office before the Conference of Rulers on the day of their assumption of office.

The Yang di-Pertuan Agong takes the oath of office as follows:

We, (name), Yang di-Pertuan Agong of Malaysia do hereby swear Wallahi; Wabillahi; Watallahi (in Allah's name and his Mercy) and by virtue of that oath do solemnly and truly declare that we shall justify and faithfully perform/carry out our duties in the administration of Malaysia in accordance with its laws and Constitution which have been promulgated or which may be promulgated from time to time in the future. Further, we do solemnly and truly declare that we shall at all time protect the religion of Islam and uphold the rules of law and order in the Nation.

Next, the Deputy Yang di-Pertuan Agong takes the oath of office as follows:

We, (name), being elected to be Timbalan Yang di-Pertuan Agong (Deputy King) of Malaysia do hereby swear Wallahi; Wabillahi; Watallahi (in Allah's name) and by virtue of that oath do solemnly and truly declare that we shall faithfully perform/carry out our duties as Timbalan Yang di-Pertuan Agong as stated in law and as may from time to time be laid down by the laws and the Constitution of Malaysia.

=== Executive and legislative members ===
Federal Constitution requires the various executive and legislative members to take the Oath of Office and Allegiance as follows:

I, (name), having been elected/appointed to the office of (office) do solemnly swear/affirm that I will faithfully discharge the duties of that office to the best of my ability, that I will bear true faith and allegiance to Malaysia and will preserve, protect and defend the Constitution.

The oath is read according to the various section of the Constitution:

Article of the Constitution	Office
43 (6)	Prime Minister, Deputy Prime Minister, Ministers, Deputy Ministers and Chief Secretary to the Government
43B (4)	Parliamentary Secretary
57 (1A) (a)	Speaker and Deputy Speakers of the House of Representatives
142 (6)	Royal Commissioners

The Members of Parliament and Senators take the Oath based on Article 59 (1) of the Federal Constitution as follows:

I, (name), having been elected/appointed as a Member of the House of Representatives/the Senate do solemnly swear/affirm that I will faithfully discharge my duties as such to the best of my ability, that I will bear true faith and allegiance to Malaysia and will preserve, protect and defend the Constitution.

Oath of Secrecy:

I, (name), do solemnly swear (or affirm) that I will not directly or indirectly communicate or reveal to any person any matter which shall be brought under my consideration or shall become known to me as (position) except as may be required for the due discharge of my duties as such or as may be specially permitted by the Yang di-Pertuan Agong/King of Malaysia.

=== Judicial members ===
Article 124 of the Federal Constitution requires the Chief Justice, the President of the Appeal Court, Chief Judge of the High Court, higher court justice and judicial commissioners to take the Oath of Office and Allegiance as follows:

I, (name), having been elected/appointed to the office of (office) do solemnly swear/affirm that I will faithfully discharge my judicial duties in that office to the best of my ability, that I will bear true faith and allegiance to Malaysia and will preserve, protect and defend the Constitution.

== Mexico ==
Article 87 of the Mexican Constitution provides that the incoming President of the Republic must take the following affirmation (called protesta by the Mexican legislation) before the Congress of the Union:

I promise to keep and enforce the Political Constitution of the United Mexican States and the laws that emanate from it, and to discharge with loyalty and patriotism the office of President of the Republic that the people have conferred on me, always looking for the wellbeing and prosperity of the Union; and if I do not do so may the Nation demand it of me.

Spanish: Protesto guardar y hacer guardar la Constitución Política de los Estados Unidos Mexicanos y las leyes que de ella emanen, y desempeñar leal y patrióticamente el cargo de Presidente de la República que el pueblo me ha conferido, mirando en todo por el bien y prosperidad de la Unión; y si así no lo hiciere que la Nación me lo demande.

The incoming President takes this affirmation whilst standing and raising his/her right arm up to shoulder level. Afterwards, the outgoing President passes the Presidential Sash (Banda Presidential) to the President of the Congress, who then gives it to the new president for him/her to wear it as a symbol of his office.

== Moldova ==
Article 79 of the Constitution of Moldova provides that the President, no more than 45 days after his/her election, and before the Parliament and Constitutional Court, gives the following oath:

I solemnly swear to devote all my personal strength and abilities to the prosperity of the Republic of Moldova, to abide by the Constitution and the laws of the country, to defend democracy, fundamental human rights and freedoms, the sovereignty, independence, unity and territorial integrity of Moldova.

== Myanmar ==
The Fourth Schedule of the 2008 Constitution of Myanmar has outlined the text of the legislative oath that freshly elected or military-appointed Members of Parliament must read aloud before joining parliament:

I ................ do solemnly and sincerely promise that as an elected representative of the [ Pyithu Hluttaw / the Amyotha Hluttaw / the Region or State Hluttaw ], I will uphold and abide by the Constitution of the Union. I will be loyal to the Republic of the Union of Myanmar and citizenry and hold always in esteem non-disintegration of the Union, non-disintegration of national solidarity and perpetuation of sovereignty. In addition, I will carry out the responsibilities uprightly to the best of my ability.

Burmese: ကျွန်ုပ် ................ သည် [ ပြည်သူ့လွှတ်တော် / အမျိုးသားလွှတ်တော် / တိုင်းဒေသကြီး သို့မဟုတ် ပြည်နယ်လွှတ်တော် ] ကိုယ်စားလှယ်အဖြစ်ရွေးချယ်ခံရပြီးဖြစ်သဖြင့် နိုင်ငံတော်ဖွဲ့စည်းပုံအခြေခံဥပဒေကို ထိန်းသိမ်းကာကွယ် စောင့်ရှောက်ပြီး နိုင်ငံတော်၏ ဥပဒေများကိုလည်း လိုက်နာပါမည်။ ပြည်ထောင်စုသမ္မတမြန်မာနိုင်ငံတော်နှင့် နိုင်ငံသားများအပေါ် သစ္စာစောင့်သိရိုသေပါမည်။ ပြည်ထောင်စု မပြိုကွဲရေး၊ တိုင်းရင်းသားစည်းလုံးညီညွတ်မှုမပြိုကွဲရေး၊ အချုပ်အခြာအာဏာတည်တံ့ ခိုင်မြဲရေးတို့ကို ထာဝစဉ်ဦးထိပ်ပန်ဆင်ဆောင်ရွက်ပါမည်။ ထို့ပြင်ယခုကျွန်ုပ်ထမ်းဆောင်မည်ဖြစ်သော တာဝန်ဝတ္တရားများကို ဖြောင့်မတ်မှန်ကန်စွာ ဆောင်ရွက်မည်ဟု လေးနက်တည်ကြည်စွာ [ ကတိသစ္စာပြုပါသည် / ကျမ်းသစ္စာဆိုပါသည် ] ။

== Netherlands ==
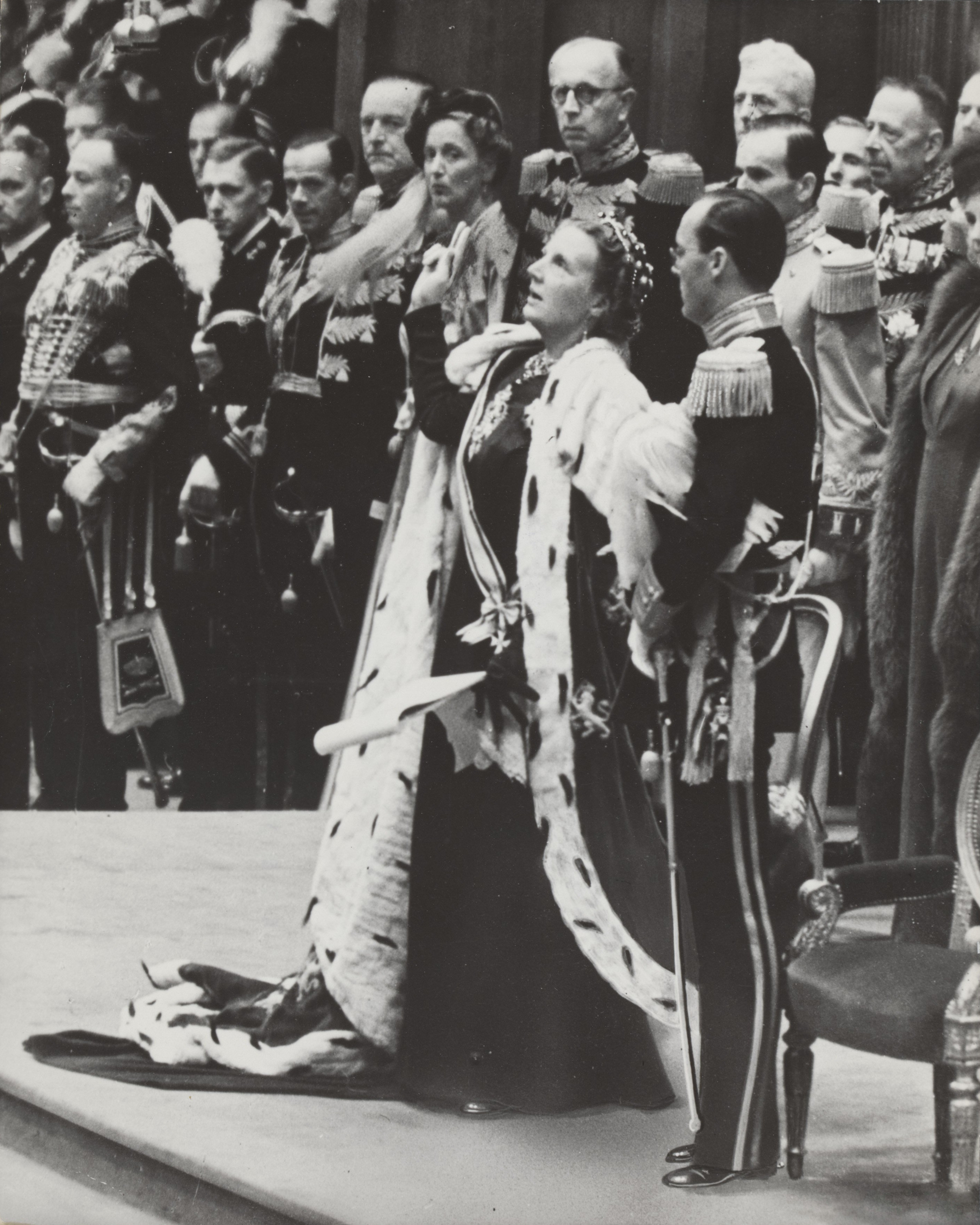
Queen Juliana swearing the oath during her Inauguration.

=== Monarch ===
As set out by the Swearing-in and Investiture Act, the oath of office for the monarch of the Netherlands, which in accordance with Article 32 of the Constitution is to be declared as soon as possible after the King or Queen takes office in a joint session of the States General in the capital of Amsterdam, is as follows:

I swear (affirm) to the peoples of the Kingdom that I will always observe and uphold the Statute for the Kingdom and the Constitution.
I swear (affirm) that I will defend and preserve, with all My power, the independence and territory of the Kingdom; that I will protect the freedom and the rights of all Dutchmen and all residents, and will employ for the maintenance and promotion of the welfare, all the means which the laws place at My disposal, as a good and true King should do.
So help me, God Almighty!
(This I affirm!)

After this declaration the president of the Senate, who presides over the joint session, makes the following declaration in the name of the States General, States of Aruba, States of Curaçao and States of Sint Maarten:

We receive you and do homage to you as King in the name of the peoples of the Kingdom and by virtue of the Statute for the Kingdom and the Constitution; we swear (affirm) that we will uphold your inviolability and the rights of your crown.
We swear (affirm) that we will do everything that good and true States General, States of Aruba, States of Curaçao and States of Sint Maarten should do.
So help us, God Almighty!
(This we affirm!)

The declaration shall then be sworn or confirmed by each of the members individually.

=== Ministers, state secretaries and members of Parliament ===
The oath of office for ministers and state secretaries, which shall be administered by the King, and for members of Parliament is as follows:

I swear (or declare) that in order to be appointed minister / state secretary / member of the States General, I have not promised or given, directly or indirectly, any gifts or presents to any person under whatsoever name or pretext.
I swear (or declare and affirm) that in order to do or refrain from doing anything whatsoever in this office, I have not accepted and will not accept, directly or indirectly, any promises or presents from anyone whomsoever.
I swear (or affirm) allegiance to the King, to the Statute for the Kingdom and to the Constitution.
I swear (or affirm) that I will faithfully perform all the duties which the office lays upon me.
So help me, God Almighty! (or, This I declare and affirm!)

=== Civil servants ===
The oath of office for civil servants is as follows:

I swear (or affirm) allegiance to the King and that I will respect the Constitution and all other laws of our country;
I swear (or declare) that in relation to my appointment, I have not provided, directly or indirectly, any false information whatsoever;
I swear (or declare) that in relation to my appointment, I have not given or promised and will not give or promise anything to any person whatsoever;
I swear (or declare) that in relation to my appointment, I have not accepted or promised and will not accept or promise any gifts or presents whatsoever;
I swear (or affirm) that I will faithfully perform all the duties which the office lays upon me and that I keep secret everything which, in relation to my office, is told me confidentially or in which I should see the confidential character, to others than whom I obliged to inform by virtue of my office;
I swear (or affirm) that I will behave as a good civil servant should do, that I will be careful, honest and reliable and that I will do nothing that harms the prestige of the office.
So help me God Almighty! (or, This I declare and affirm!)

== New Zealand ==
=== Governor-General ===
The chief justice of New Zealand administers the oath of office at the swearing-in of new governors-general of New Zealand. The oath is as follows:

I, [name], swear that, as Governor-General and Commander-in-Chief of the Realm of New Zealand, comprising New Zealand; the self-governing states of the Cook Islands and Niue; Tokelau; and the Ross Dependency, I will faithfully and impartially serve His [or Her] Majesty [specify the name of the reigning Sovereign, as thus: King Charles the Third], King of New Zealand [or Queen of New Zealand], His [or Her] heirs and successors, and the people of the Realm of New Zealand, in accordance with their respective laws and customs. So help me God.

An affirmation may be used instead of this oath.

=== Prime Minister, Ministers, and Members of the Parliament ===
The oath of the Prime Minister, Ministers, and Members of the Parliament are required to recite the 2 oaths which are the Oath of Allegiance and of Execution.

Oath of Allegiance

I, [name], swear that I will be faithful and bear true allegiance to His/Her Majesty (name of monarch), his heirs and successors according to law. So help me God.

Oath of Execution

I, [name], being chosen and admitted to the Executive Council of New Zealand, swear that I will do honor to the best of my judgement at all times, when there to required, freely of my counsel of advice to the Governor-General to the time being, for the good management of the affairs of New Zealand; that I will not directly nor indirectly reveal such matters shall be debated in council and committed to my secrecy; that I will at all times be true and faithful counselor. So help me God.

== Norway ==
As soon as the King, being of age, accedes to the Government, he shall take the following oath before the Storting (article 9 of the Constitution of Norway):

I promise and swear that I will govern the Kingdom of Norway in accordance with its Constitution and Laws; so help me God, the Almighty and Omniscient.

If the Storting is not in session at the time, the oath shall be made in writing in the Council of State and be repeated solemnly by the King at the first subsequent Storting.

== Pakistan ==
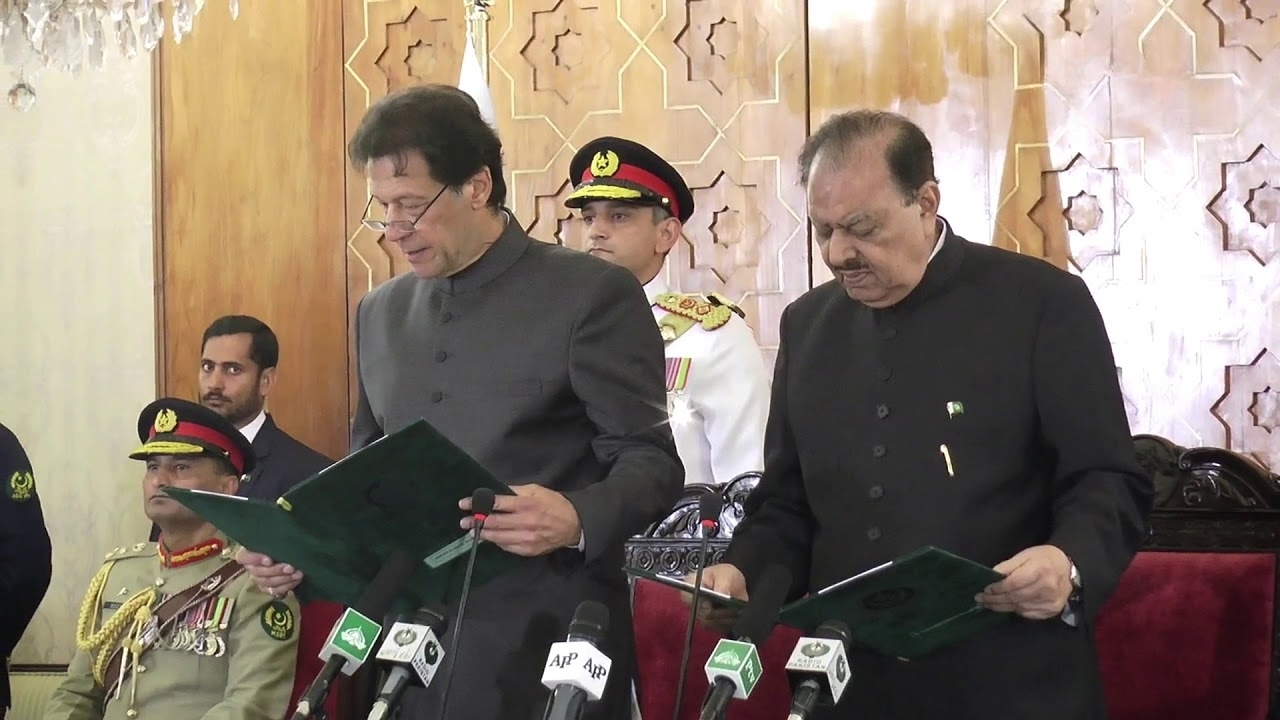
Since presidential elections in Pakistan are held after prime ministerial elections, oftentimes the prime minister's oath is administered by a president from an opposing party. As seen, Prime Minister Imran Khan from the PTI, the government party is given an oath from President Mamnoon Hussain who is from the PML-N, the opposition party in 2018.

The oath of office of the President of Pakistan is administered by the Chief Justice of Pakistan and is as follows:

I, (name), do solemnly swear that I am a Muslim and believe in the Unity and Oneness of Almighty Allah, the Books of Allah, the Holy Quran being the last of them, the Prophethood of Muhammad as the last of the Prophets and that there can be no Prophet after him, the Day of Judgement, and all the requirements and teachings of the Holy Quran and Sunnah:

That I will bear true faith and allegiance to Pakistan: That, as President of Pakistan, I will discharge my duties, and perform my functions, honestly, to the best of my ability, faithfully in accordance with the Constitution of the Islamic Republic of Pakistan and the law, and always in the interest of the sovereignty, integrity, solidarity, well- being and prosperity of Pakistan: That I will not allow my personal interest to influence my official conduct or my official decisions: That I will preserve, protect and defend the Constitution of the Islamic Republic of Pakistan: That, in all circumstances, I will do right to all manner of people, according to law, without fear or favor, affection or ill- will:

And that I will not directly or indirectly communicate or reveal to any person any matter which shall be brought under my consideration or shall become known to me as President of Pakistan, except as may be required for the due discharge of my duties as President.

May Allah Almighty help and guide me (A'meen).

The oath of office of the Prime Minister of Pakistan is administered by the President of Pakistan and is as follows:

I, (name), do swear solemnly that I am a Muslim and believe in the Unity and Oneness of Almighty Allah, the Books of Allah, the Holy Quran being the last of them, the Prophethood of Muhammad as the last of the Prophets and that there can be no Prophet after him, the Day of Judgement, and all the requirements and teachings of the Holy Quran and Sunnah:

That I will bear true faith and allegiance to Pakistan: That, as Prime Minister of Pakistan, I will discharge my duties, and perform my functions, honestly, to the best of my ability, faithfully in accordance with the Constitution of the Islamic Republic of Pakistan and the law, and always in the interest of the sovereignty, integrity, solidarity, well- being and prosperity of Pakistan: That I will strive to preserve the Islamic Ideology which is the basis for the creation of Pakistan: That I will not allow my personal interest to influence my official conduct or my official decisions: That I will preserve, protect and defend the Constitution of the Islamic Republic of Pakistan: That, in all circumstances, I will do right to all manner of people, according to law, without fear or favor, affection or ill- will: And that I will not directly or indirectly communicate or reveal to any person any matter which shall be brought under my consideration or shall become known to me as Prime Minister except as may be required for the due discharge of my duties as Prime Minister.

May Allah Almighty help and guide me (A'meen)

== Palestine ==
Before assuming office, the President of Palestine take the following oath before the Legislative Council and in the presence of the Speaker of the Palestinian National Council and the President of the High Court:

"I (name), swear by God, the Almighty, to be faithful to the homeland and to its sacred places, to the people and its national heritage, to respect the constitutional system and the law, and to safeguard the interests of the Palestinian people completely, as God is my witness."

== Philippines ==
The oath of office of the President of the Philippines as written in the 1987 Constitution is as follows:

I, (name), do solemnly swear (or affirm) that I will faithfully and conscientiously fulfill my duties as President (or Vice-President or Acting President) of the Philippines, preserve and defend its Constitution, execute its laws, do justice to every man, and consecrate myself to the service of the Nation. So help me God." [In case of affirmation, last sentence will be omitted].

The oath from the Filipino language version of the constitution was used for the inauguration of Presidents Fidel V. Ramos, Joseph Estrada, Benigno Aquino III, and Bongbong Marcos.

"Ako si (pangalan), ay taimtim kong pinanunumpaan (o pinatotohanan) na tutuparin ko nang buong katapatan at sigasig ang aking mga tungkulin bilang Pangulo (o Pangalawang Pangulo o Nanunungkulang Pangulo) ng Pilipinas, pangangalagaan at ipagtatanggol ang kanyang Konstitusyon, ipatutupad ang mga batas nito, magiging makatarungan sa bawat tao, at itatalaga ang aking sarili sa paglilingkod sa Bansa. Kasihan nawa ako ng Diyos." (Kapag pagpapatotoo, ang huling pangungusap ay kakaltasin.)

Prior to the 1987 Constitution the oath of office for the President of the Philippines is as follows:

I, (name) of (Hometown), having been elected and proclaimed as President of the Philippines, do solemnly swear (or affirm) that I will faithfully and conscientiously fulfill my duties as President (or Vice-President or Acting President) of the Philippines, preserve and defend its Constitution, execute its laws, do justice to every man, and consecrate myself to the service of the Nation. So help me God." [In case of affirmation, last sentence will be omitted].

During the second inauguration of President Ferdinand Marcos, a Filipino language version of the 1935 Constitution oath of office was used.

Ako si, __________ ng __________, inihalal at itinanghal na Pangulo ng Pilipinas, ay taimtim na sumusumpa na tutuparin ko ng buong katapatan at mabudhiing pag-iisip ang mga tungkulin ko bilang Pangulo ng Pilipinas, na aking pananatilihin at ipatatanggol ang Saligang-Batas, isasakatuparan ko ang mga batas, magbibigay katarungan sa bawat tao, at itatalaga ang aking sarili sa paglilingkod sa bayan. Kasihan nawa ako ng Maykapal.

During the inauguration of President Corazon C. Aquino, this version was used:

I, (name), do solemnly swear (or affirm) that I will faithfully and conscientiously fulfill my duties as President (or Vice-President or Acting President) of the Philippines, preserve and defend its fundamental law, execute its just laws, do justice to every man, and consecrate myself to the service of the Nation. So help me God." [In case of affirmation, last sentence will be omitted].

The oath of office requirement for all public officers and employees of the government including every member of the armed forces is as follows:

All public officers and employees of the government including every member of the armed forces shall, before entering upon the discharge of his duties, take an oath or affirmation to uphold and defend the Constitution; that he will bear true faith and allegiance to it; obey the laws, legal orders and decrees promulgated by the duly constituted authorities; will well and faithfully discharge to the best of his ability the duties of the office or position upon which he is about to enter; and that he voluntarily assumes the obligation imposed by his oath of office, without mental reservation or purpose of evasion.

The oath of office for all public officials and employees is as follows:

I, (name) of (Residence), having been elected/appointed/promoted to the position/rank of (office), do hereby solemnly swear that I will well and faithfully discharge to the best of my ability, the duties of my present position and of all others I may hereafter hold, under the Republic of the Philippines, that I will support and defend the Constitution of the Philippines, that I will bear true faith and allegiance to the same, that I will obey the laws, legal orders and decrees, promulgated by the duly constituted authorities of the Republic of the Philippines, and that I impose this obligation upon myself, voluntarily, without mental reservation or purpose of evasion. So Help me God.

Filipino version:

Ako si________________ng______________, naihalal/naitinalaga/naiangat sa katungkulan/rango bilang_____________, ay taimtim na nanunumpa na tutuparin ko ng buong husay at katapatan sa abot ng aking kakayahan, ang mga tungkulin ng aking kasalukuyan katungkulan at ng mga iba pang pagkaraan nito'y gagampanan ko sa ilalim ng Republika ng Pilipinas; na aking itataguyod at ipagtatanggol ang saligang batas/konstitusyon ng Pilipinas; na tunay na mananalig at tatalima ako rito; na susundin ko ang mga batas, mga kautusang legal, at mga dikretong pinaiiral ng mga sadyang itinakdang may kapangyarihan ng Republika ng Pilipinas, at kusa kong babalikatin ang mga pananagutang ito na walang anumang pasubali o hangaring umiwas. Kasihan nawa ako ng Diyos.

Filipino version (alternate):

Ako si________________ng, ____________, naihalal/natinalaga/naiangat sa katungkulan/rango bilang_____________, ay taimtim na nanunumpa na tutuparin ko ng buong husay at katapatan sa abot ng aking makakaya, ang mga takdang gampanin ng aking bagong katungkulan alinsabay nitoy nangangako ako sa ngalan ng Republika ng Pilipinas; na aking itataguyod at ipagtatanggol ang saligang batas/konstitusyon; na tunay na mananalig at tatalima ako rito; na susundin ko ang mga alintuntunin, mga kautusang legal, at mga dikretong pinaiiral ng mga sadyang itinakdang may kapangyarihan sa ilalim ng Republika ng Pilipinas, at kusa kong babalikatin ang mga pananagutang ito na walang anumang pasubali o hangaring umiwas. Kasihan nawa ako ng Diyos.

If done for personnel of the Armed Forces of the Philippines, instead of legal orders/mga katususang legal, the phrase lawful orders/mga utos na ayon sa batas is used.

=== Oath of Allegiance ===
This oath shall taken to those foreign nationals who acquire the Filipino citizenship:

I, (name), do solemnly swear that I will support and defend the constitution of the Republic of the Philippines and obey the laws and legal orders promulgated by the duly constituted authorities of the Philippines, and I hereby declare that I recognize and accept the supreme authority of the Philippines, and will maintain true faith and allegiance thereto; and that I impose this obligation upon myself, voluntarily, without mental reservation or purpose of evasion. So help me God.

=== Oath of Office of Organization/Association ===
This oath shall taken to all elected/appointed officers of different civil society groups/organizations as administered by the President:

I, (name), having been elected/appointed as (position) of the (name of organization/association), do hereby solemnly swear that I will faithfully and conscientiously discharge the duties of my position, preserve and defend the constitution and bylaws of the organization/association, carry out to the best of my ability, its lofty purposes and objectives, and promote and enhance its interests. And I hereby impose this obligation upon myself, voluntarily, without mental reservation or purpose of evasion. So help me God.

== Poland ==
=== President ===
Assuming, by the will of the Nation, the office of President of the Republic of Poland, I do solemnly swear to be faithful to the provisions of the Constitution; I pledge that I shall steadfastly safeguard the dignity of the Nation, the independence and security of the State, and also that the good of the Homeland and the prosperity of its citizens shall forever remain my supreme obligation.

"So help me God" (Tak mi dopomóż Bóg) formula at the end is optional.

=== Prime Minister, Deputy Prime Minister, Minister ===
Assuming this office of Prime Minister (or Deputy Prime Minister or minister), I do solemnly swear to be faithful to the provisions of the Constitution and other laws of the Republic of Poland, and that the good of the Homeland and the prosperity of its citizens shall forever remain my supreme obligation.

"So help me God" (Tak mi dopomóż Bóg) formula at the end is optional.

=== Sejm Members and Senators ===
I do solemnly swear to perform my duties to the Nation diligently and conscientiously, to safeguard the sovereignty and interests of the State, to do all within my power for the prosperity of the Homeland and the well-being of its citizens, and to observe the Constitution and other laws of the Republic of Poland.

"So help me God" (Tak mi dopomóż Bóg) formula at the end is optional.

== Portugal ==
The Constitution of Portugal requires that the following oath be taken by the President-elect upon his or her official inauguration:

In Portuguese:

Juro por minha honra desempenhar fielmente as funções em que fico investido e defender, cumprir e fazer cumprir a Constituição da República Portuguesa.

In English:

I swear by my honour to faithfully perform the functions in which I am invested and to defend and observe the Constitution of the Portuguese Republic and cause it to be observed.

== Romania ==
=== President ===
Article 82 of the Constitution of Romania provides that the President, before the Chamber of Deputies and Senate in joint session, gives the following oath:

I solemnly swear that I will dedicate all my strength and the best of my abilities for the spiritual and material welfare of the Romanian people, to abide by the Constitution and laws of the country, to defend democracy, the fundamental rights and freedoms of my fellow citizens, Romania's sovereignty, independence, unity and territorial integrity. So help me God!

=== Local officials ===
Article 32 of the Law 215 (23 April 2001) provides that all local officials (Local Councilors, Mayors, County Councilors and County Council Presidents), before the assembled Councils and the Prefect of the county, give, in Romanian the following oath.

I solemnly swear to abide by the Constitution and laws of the country, and in good faith, to dedicate all my strength and the best of my abilities for the good of the citizens of the commune of (city, municipality or county)___. So help me God!

Romanian: Jur să respect Constituţia şi legile ţării şi să fac, cu bună-credinţă, tot ceea ce stă în puterile şi priceperea mea pentru binele locuitorilor comunei (oraşului, municipiului, judeţului)... Aşa să-mi ajute Dumnezeu!

The religious formula may be omitted.

== Russia ==
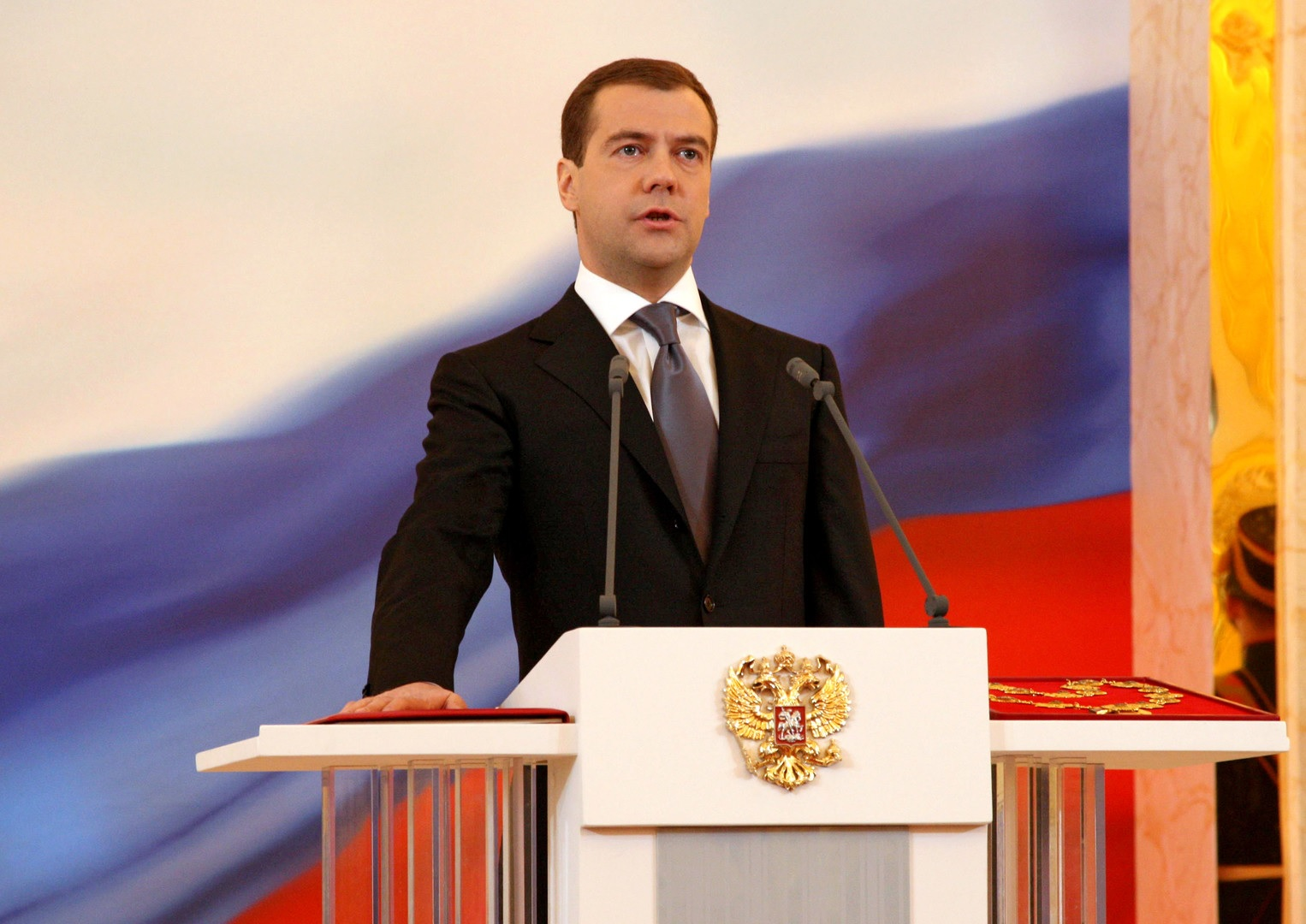
Dmitry Medvedev taking the presidential oath in the Grand Kremlin Palace on 7 May 2008

The oath of office of the President of Russia is prescribed in the Constitution of Russia, in Chapter 4 (The President of the Russian Federation), Article 82:

1. When taking office the President of the Russian Federation shall take the following oath of loyalty to the people:

In Russian: Клянусь при осуществлении полномочий Президента Российской Федерации уважать и охранять права и свободы человека и гражданина, соблюдать и защищать Конституцию Российской Федерации, защищать суверенитет и независимость, безопасность и целостность государства, верно служить народу.

In Russian (transliteration): Klyanus' pri osushchestvlenii polnomochiy Prezidenta Rossiyskoy Federatsii uvazhat' i okhranyat' prava i svobody cheloveka i grazhdanina, soblyudat' i zashchishchat' Konstitutsiyu Rossiyskoy Federatsii, zashchishchat' suverenitet i nezavisimost', bezopasnost' i tselostnost' gosudarstva, verno sluzhit' narodu.

I swear in exercising the powers of the President of the Russian Federation to respect and safeguard the rights and freedoms of man and citizen, to observe and protect the Constitution of the Russian Federation, to protect the sovereignty and independence, security and integrity of the State, to faithfully serve the people.

2. The oath shall be taken in a solemn atmosphere in the presence of members of the Federation Council, deputies of the State Duma and judges of the Constitution Court of the Russian Federation.

=== Russian Empire ===
During the Coronation of the Russian monarch, after his anointing, but prior to partaking of Holy Communion, the Tsar recited a coronation oath, in which he swore to preserve the autocracy intact and to rule his realm with justice and fairness.

== Singapore ==
The oath of office of the President of Singapore is as follows:

I, (name), having been elected President of the Republic of Singapore, do solemnly swear (or affirm) that I will faithfully discharge my duties as such to the best of my ability without fear or favor, affection or ill-will, and without regard to any previous affiliation with any political party, and that I will bear true faith and allegiance to the Republic, and that I will preserve, protect, and defend the constitution of the Republic of Singapore.

The Prime Minister of Singapore swears 2 oaths: the Oaths of Office and Oath of Affirmation respectively:

I, (name), having been appointed to the office of Prime Minister, do solemnly swear (or affirm) that I will bear true faith and allegiance to the Republic of Singapore, and that I will preserve, protect and defend the Constitution of the Republic of Singapore.

I, (name), being chosen and appointed Prime Minister of Singapore, do solemnly swear (or affirm) that I will at all times faithfully discharge my duties as Prime Minister, according to law, to the best of my knowledge and ability, and without fear or favour, affection or ill-will.

For Ministers of the Cabinet of Singapore, they swear the Oaths of Allegiance and Execution of Office respectively:

I, (name), having been appointed to the office of Minister, do solemnly swear (or affirm) that I will bear true faith and allegiance to the Republic of Singapore, and that I will preserve, protect and defend the Constitution of the Republic of Singapore.

I, (name), being chosen as Minister of Singapore, do solemnly swear (or affirm) that I will at all times faithfully discharge my duties as Minister according to law, and to the best of my knowledge and ability, without fear or favour, affection or ill-will.

For members of the Parliament of Singapore, it is:

I, (name), having been elected as a Member of the Parliament of Singapore, do solemnly swear (or affirm) that I will faithfully discharge my duties as such to the best of my ability, that I will bear true faith and allegiance to the Republic of Singapore, and that I will preserve, protect and defend the Constitution of the Republic of Singapore.

For the Mayors of Community Development Council, it is:

I, (name), having been appointed as Mayor of (district name), do solemnly swear (or affirm) that I will faithfully discharge my duties without fear or favour, affection or ill-will, to the best of my ability, and will faithfully endeavor to be a good Mayor.

The phrase "So Help me God" in the last sentence is uttered if those who will take the oath is a Christian.

== San Marino ==
The Captains Regent of San Marino are sworn into office by reciting the following oath:

Giving praise and reverence to Almighty God, Blessed Mary ever Virgin, Blessed Marino, Patron and defender of the Commune and the People of this Land, and of its curia, District and Peasantry, You, Captains Regent, called and elected to govern the Republic for the six months ahead starting from today, and to continue and finish happily, by putting your hands on the holy Gospels of God, you swear that you will always preserve the Republic and its empire, freedom, dignity, privileges, exemptions and any other right, with your eyes, soul, thoughts and care, and that your mind will only be centred on public good.

With all your strength, you will promote peace and harmony among citizens, of which there is nothing more healthy in a free City; day and night, you will be the most vigilant custodians of this Land and you will care to observe and enforce the Statutes, laws and decrees of this Land, both existing and to be drawn up, and, in default of them, the praiseworthy customs of the People.

You will be favourable and benign defenders of widows, orphans, children and poor people, as well as of Churches, Hospitals and other venerable places, as well as of property, and of their rights.

Constantly, at the usual times during your office, you will sit on your usual Throne to adopt decisions that are equal for all, and you will always act in a way that you judge will be good for the Republic and its citizens.

== South Africa ==
Schedule 2 of the Constitution of South Africa specifies the oaths or affirmations of office for the various high offices of state. These oaths are sworn before the Chief Justice or another judge designated by the Chief Justice.

The President and any Acting President swears the following oath:

In the presence of everyone assembled here, and in full realization of the high calling, I assume as President (or Acting President) of the Republic of South Africa. I, (name), swear (or solemnly affirm) that I will be faithful to the Republic of South Africa, and will obey, observe, uphold and maintain the Constitution and all other law of the Republic; and I solemnly and sincerely promise that I will always promote all that will advance the Republic, and oppose all that may harm it; protect and promote the rights of all South Africans; discharge my duties with all my strength and talents to the best of my knowledge and ability and true to the dictates of my conscience; do justice to all; and devote myself to the well-being of the Republic and all of its people. (So help me God.)

The Deputy President swears the following oath:

In the presence of everyone assembled here, and in full realisation of the high calling I assume as Deputy President of the Republic of South Africa, I, (name), swear (or solemnly affirm) that I will be faithful to the Republic of South Africa and will obey, observe, uphold and maintain the Constitution and all other law of the Republic; and I solemnly and sincerely promise that I will always promote all that will advance the Republic, and oppose all that may harm it; be a true and faithful counsellor; discharge my duties with all my strength and talents to the best of my knowledge and ability and true to the dictates of my conscience; do justice to all; and devote myself to the well-being of the Republic and all of its people. (So help me God.)

Ministers and Deputy Ministers of the Cabinet swear the following oath:

I, (name), swear (or solemnly affirm) that I will be faithful to the Republic of South Africa and will obey, respect and uphold the Constitution and all other law of the Republic; and I undertake to hold my office as Minister (or Deputy Minister) with honour and dignity; to be a true and faithful counsellor; not to divulge directly or indirectly any secret matter entrusted to me; and to perform the functions of my office conscientiously and to the best of my ability. (So help me God.)

Members of the National Assembly, the National Council of Provinces and the provincial legislatures swear the following oath:

I, (name), swear (or solemnly affirm) that I will be faithful to the Republic of South Africa and will obey, respect and uphold the Constitution and all other law of the Republic, and I solemnly promise to perform my functions as a member of the National Assembly (or permanent delegate to the National Council of Provinces, or member of the legislature of the province of (province)) to the best of my ability. (So help me God.)

Premiers, Acting Premiers and Members of the Executive Council of a province swear the following oath:

I, (name), swear (or solemnly affirm) that I will be faithful to the Republic of South Africa and will obey, respect and uphold the Constitution and all other law of the Republic; and I undertake to hold my office as Premier (or Acting Premier or member of the Executive Council) of the province of (province) with honour and dignity; to be a true and faithful counsellor; not to divulge directly or indirectly any secret matter entrusted to me; and to perform the functions of my office conscientiously and to the best of my ability. (So help me God.)

Judges and acting judges swear the following oath:

I, (name), swear (or solemnly affirm) that, as a Judge of the (court), I will be faithful to the Republic of South Africa, will uphold and protect the Constitution and the human rights entrenched in it, and will administer justice to all persons alike without fear, favour or prejudice, in accordance with the Constitution and the law. (So help me God.)

== Spain ==
Article 61 of the Spanish Constitution requires the King to take the following oath as soon as practicable after ascending to the Throne and before performing any other official duty:

I swear to faithfully execute my duties, obey and enforce the Constitution and the laws, to respect the rights of the citizens and of the Autonomous Communities.

The heir to the Crown, upon becoming of age, and any Regents, upon taking office, are required by the Constitution to take the same oath, adding to it a vow of allegiance to the King.

In an inauguration ceremony a new Spanish Prime Minister takes an oath or affirmation of office over an open Constitution, which may be next to a cross and a Bible, and before the King of Spain and other dignitaries.

I swear/promise, under my conscience and honor, to faithfully execute the duties of the office of President of the Government with loyalty to the King, obey and enforce the Constitution as the fundamental law of the State, and preserve in secret the deliberations of the Council of Ministers. (Note: Juro/Prometo, por mi conciencia y honor, cumplir fielmente las obligaciones del cargo de Presidente del Gobierno con lealtad al Rey, guardar y hacer guardar la Constitución como norma fundamental del Estado, así como mantener el secreto de las deliberaciones del Consejo de Ministros.)

Other ministers take a similar oath.

== Sweden ==
In Sweden, a judge, whether a legally trained judge or a lay judge (Swedish: nämndeman) shall take the following oath before assuming the duties of their office:

I, (name), promise and affirm on my honour and conscience that I will and shall impartially, as to the rich as well as to the poor, administer justice in all matters to the best of my ability and conscience, and judge according to the law of the Realm of Sweden; that I will never manipulate the law or further injustice for kinship, relation by marriage, friendship, envy, ill-will, or fear, nor for bribes or gifts, or any other cause in whatever guise it may appear; nor will I declare guilty one who is innocent, or innocent one who is guilty. Neither before nor after the pronouncement of the judgment of the court shall I disclose to the litigants or to other persons the in camera deliberations of the court. All this, as a honest and righteous judge, I will and shall faithfully observe.

== Switzerland ==
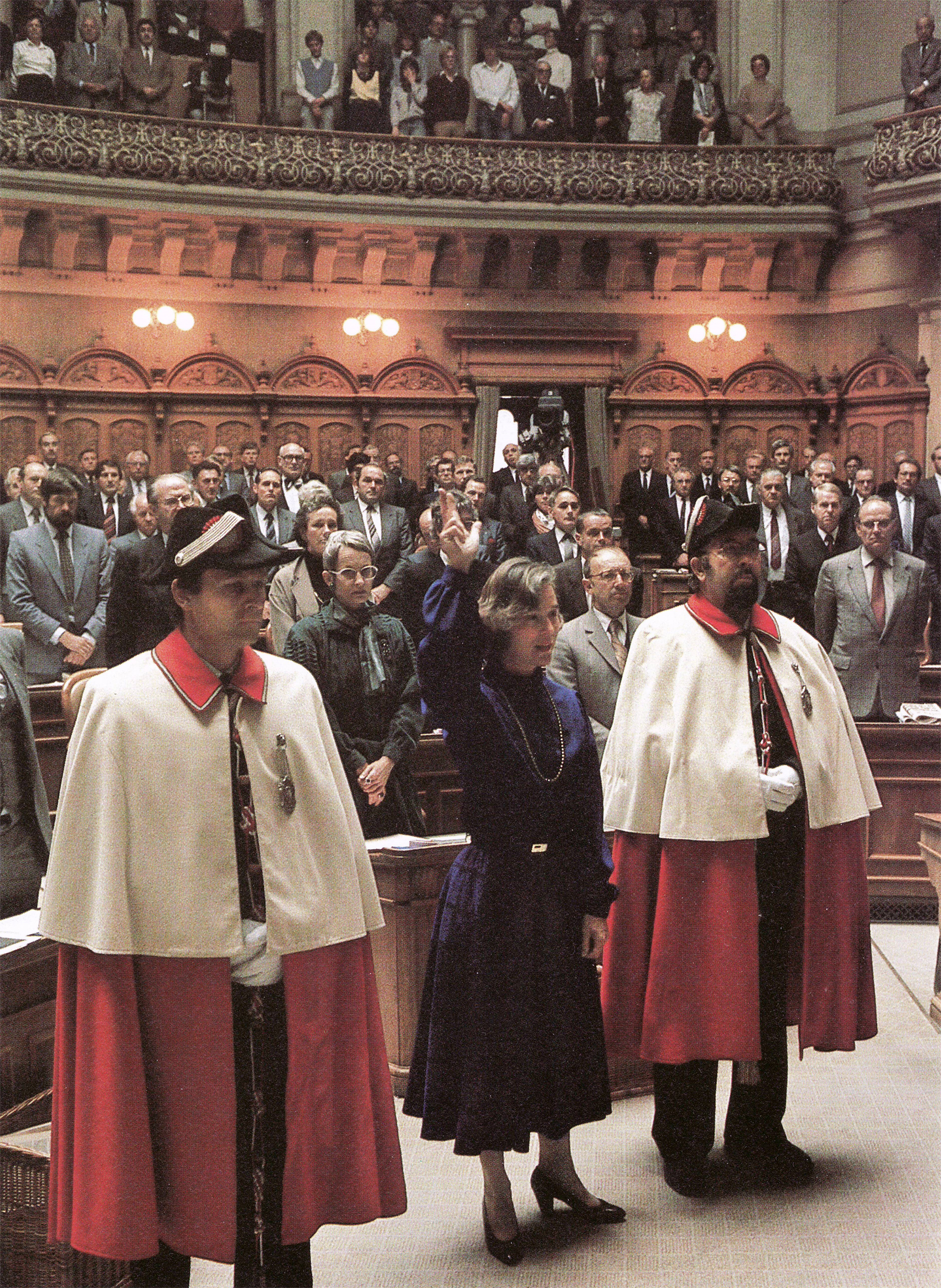
Elisabeth Kopp's oath of office after her election at the Swiss Federal Council in 1984

In Switzerland, according to the Federal Act on the Federal Assembly, people elected at the Swiss Federal Assembly or elected by it (such as the Swiss Federal Council) have to take an oath in front of the assembly.

The oath is as follows:

I swear by God the Almighty to uphold the Constitution and the law and to fulfil the duties of my office to the best of my abilities.

The solemn promise is as follows:

I solemnly promise to uphold the Constitution and the law and to fulfil the duties of my office to the best of my abilities.

== Republic of China (Taiwan) ==
In the Republic of China (mostly Taiwan and surrounding islands), the oath of office is required to be taken by the President-elect before assuming office. The Oath of office for the President of the Republic of China is specified in the Constitution of the Republic of China (Article 48):

The President shall, at the time of assuming office, take the following oath:

I do solemnly and sincerely swear before the people of the whole country that I will observe the Constitution, faithfully perform my duties, promote the welfare of the people, safeguard the security of the State, and will in no way betray the people's trust. Should I break my oath, I shall be willing to submit myself to severe punishment by the State. This is my solemn oath.

余謹以至誠，向全國人民宣誓，余必遵守憲法，盡忠職務，增進人民福利，保衛國家，無負國民付託。如違誓言，願受國家嚴厲之制裁。謹誓。

The Vice President shall also take the oath of office prior to assumption and it reads:

I do solemnly and sincerely swear before the people of the whole country that I will observe the Constitution and pledge loyalty to the State. Should I break my oath, I shall be willing to submit myself to severe punishment by the State. This is my solemn oath.

余謹以至誠，向全國人民宣誓。余必遵守憲法，效忠國家，如違誓言，願受國家嚴厲之制裁。謹誓。

Legislators, councilors of the special municipality, county/city councilors, and township/city representatives shall take the oath of office prior to assumption and it reads:

I do solemnly and sincerely swear that I will observe the Constitution, be loyal to the nation, and perform duties on behalf of nationals without playing favorites and committing irregularities, pursuing personal profits, taking bribes, or interfering the judicial process. Should I break my oath, I shall be willing to submit myself to the severest punishment. This is my solemn oath.

余誓以至誠，恪遵憲法，效忠國家，代表人民依法行使職權，不徇私舞弊，不營求私利，不受授賄賂，不干涉司法。如違誓言，願受最嚴厲之制裁，謹誓。

The speaker and deputy speaker of the Legislative Yuan, the speaker and deputy speaker of the council of the special municipality and county/city council, and the chairperson and vice chairperson of township/city council, Political appointees, directors and deputy directors, and department heads whose rank is above the tenth grade of senior-level civil servants in agencies at various levels of the central government, Justices of the Judicial Yuan, members of the Examination Yuan, members, President and Vice President of the Control Yuan, Ambassadors, ministers, chargé d'affaires, consul generals, and consuls in the consulate, or other equivalent supervising personnel in diplomatic missions, Judges of courts at various levels, prosecutors of prosecutorial agencies and judges of administrative courts and judges of disciplinary courts, Mayors, committee members, and heads of the subordinate institutes of the special municipality, Magistrates and heads of subordinate institutes in county/city, Mayors of township/city, Principals of all-level public schools, Heads, directors, and supervisors of public enterprises and their subordinate institutes, whose rank is above the tenth grade of senior-level civil servants shall take the oath of office prior to assumption and it reads:

I do solemnly and sincerely swear that I will observe all the national regulations, faithfully perform my duties, and contribute myself to the nation without wasting public money, employing improper personnel, playing favorites and committing irregularities, and taking bribes. Should I break my oath, I shall be willing to submit myself to the severest punishment. This is my solemn oath.

余誓以至誠，恪遵國家法令，盡忠職守，報效國家，不妄費公帑，不濫用人員，不營私舞弊，不受授賄賂。如違誓言，願受最嚴厲之處罰，謹誓。

== Thailand ==
Chapter VIII, Section 161 of the Constitution of Thailand states that the Prime Minister and the Council of Ministers upon assumption of his/her duties must make an oath before the King/Queen in these words:

I, [name], do solemnly declare that I will be loyal to the King/Queen and will faithfully perform my duties in the interest of the country and of the people. I will also uphold and observe the Constitution of the Kingdom of Thailand in every respect.

== Turkey ==
All members of the Turkish Parliament, as well as cabinet ministers that are not members of parliament are required to take the following oath in a parliamentary session before taking office. The Turkish President takes a slightly modified version of this oath:

I swear upon my honour and integrity, before the great Turkish Nation, to safeguard the existence and independence of the state, the indivisible integrity of the country and the nation, and the absolute sovereignty of the nation; to remain loyal to the supremacy of law, to the democratic and secular republic, and to Atatürk’s principles and reforms; not to deviate from the ideal according to which everyone is entitled to enjoy human rights and fundamental freedoms under the notion of peace and prosperity in society, national solidarity and justice, and loyalty to the Constitution.

All members of the Turkish Armed Forces should take the following oath before starting their service:

I hereby take an oath on my honor:

To serve my nation and republic in times of war and peace with integrity and affection, on land, on the sea, and in the air, To abide by all rules and regulations and to obey my superiors, To value more than my life, the honor of service and the reputation of the Turkish Flag,

And if necessary, to willingly give up my life in the name of duty, homeland, and republic.

== Ukraine ==
=== President of Ukraine ===
In Ukraine, the Chairman of the Constitutional Court of Ukraine administers the oath of office. The President-elect recites the oath with his hand on the Constitution and the Peresopnytsia Gospels.^{[c]} The Ukrainian text of the oath according to the article 104 is:

Я, (ім'я та прізвище), волею народу обраний Президентом України, заступаючи на цей високий пост, урочисто присягаю на вірність Україні. Зобов'язуюсь усіма своїми справами боронити суверенітет і незалежність України, дбати про благо Вітчизни і добробут Українського народу, обстоювати права і свободи громадян, додержуватися Конституції України і законів України, виконувати свої обов'язки в інтересах усіх співвітчизників, підносити авторитет України у світі.

The official English translation:

I, (name and surname), elected by the will of the people as the President of Ukraine, assuming this high office, do solemnly swear allegiance to Ukraine. I pledge with all my undertakings to protect the sovereignty and independence of Ukraine, to provide for the good of the Motherland and the welfare of the Ukrainian people, to protect the rights and freedoms of citizens, to abide by the Constitution of Ukraine and the laws of Ukraine, to exercise my duties in the interests of all compatriots, and to enhance the prestige of Ukraine in the world.

=== People's Deputies of Ukraine ===
Before assuming office, a People's Deputy of Ukraine must take the following oath before the parliament:

In original Ukrainian:

Присягаю на вірність Україні. Зобов'язуюсь усіма своїми діями боронити суверенітет і незалежність України, дбати про благо Вітчизни і добробут Українського народу.
Присягаю додержуватися Конституції України та законів України, виконувати свої обов'язки в інтересах усіх співвітчизників.

In English translation:

I swear allegiance to Ukraine. I commit myself with all my deeds to protect the sovereignty and independence of Ukraine, to provide for the good of the Motherland and for the welfare of the Ukrainian people.
I swear to abide by the Constitution of Ukraine and the laws of Ukraine, to carry out my duties in the interests of all compatriots.

A refusal of taking the oath on the first day of the Supreme Council's new plenary session is considered a loss of a deputy's elected mandate.

=== Members of the Cabinet of Ministers ===
After being approved by the Parliament, members of the Cabinet of Ministers must take an oath to assume office.

In original Ukrainian:

Усвідомлюючи високу відповідальність члена Кабінету Міністрів України, урочисто присягаю на вірність Українському народові. Зобов’язуюся додержуватися Конституції України та законів України, зміцнювати суверенітет і незалежність України, обстоювати права і свободи людини та громадянина, дбати про добробут Українського народу, сталий демократичний розвиток суспільства.

Unofficial English translation:

Aware of the high responsibility of a member of the Cabinet of Ministers of Ukraine, I solemnly swear allegiance to the Ukrainian people. I undertake to abide by the Constitution of Ukraine and the laws of Ukraine, to strengthen the sovereignty and independence of Ukraine, to defend the rights and freedoms of man and citizen, to care for the welfare of the Ukrainian people, and to sustain the democratic development of society.

Refusal to take an oath on the day of appointment is considered to be the refusal of his/her ministerial office.

== United Kingdom ==
=== Oaths taken by the monarch ===
In the United Kingdom, no formal oath is essential to be taken by the monarch in relation to accession. The monarch is, however, required to take an oath regarding the security of the Church of Scotland. At a coronation, the monarch usually takes an oath but as a coronation is inessential. Monarchs need not take a similar oath in order to discharge their duties, as with the case of Edward VIII, who was never crowned during his one-year reign. The exact wording of the coronation oath of various monarchs has altered throughout the years without statutory authority but remain based on the oath as prescribed by the Coronation Oath Act 1688.

==== Coronation Oath ====
The following was the oath taken by Queen Elizabeth II at her coronation on 2 June 1953:

Archbishop: Will you solemnly promise and swear to govern the Peoples of the United Kingdom of Great Britain and Northern Ireland, Canada, Australia, New Zealand, the Union of South Africa, Pakistan, and Ceylon, and of your Possessions and the other Territories to any of them belonging or pertaining, according to their respective laws and customs?

Queen: I solemnly promise so to do.

Archbishop: Will you to your power cause Law and Justice, in Mercy, to be executed in all your judgments?

Queen: I will.

Archbishop: Will you to the utmost of your power maintain the Laws of God and the true profession of the Gospel? Will you to the utmost of your power maintain in the United Kingdom the Protestant Reformed Religion established by law? Will you maintain and preserve inviolably the settlement of the Church of England, and the doctrine, worship, discipline, and government thereof, as by law established in England? And will you preserve unto the Bishops and Clergy of England, and to the Churches there committed to their charge, all such rights and privileges, as by law do or shall appertain to them or any of them?

Queen: All this I promise to do.

Then the Queen arising out of her Chair, supported as before, the Sword of State being carried before her, shall go to the Altar, and make her solemn Oath in the sight of all the people to observe the premisses: laying her right hand upon the Holy Gospel in the great Bible (which was before carried in the procession and is now brought from the Altar by the Archbishop, and tendered to her as she kneels upon the steps), and saying these words:

The things which I have here before promised, I will perform and keep. So help me God.

The following was the oath taken by King Charles III at his coronation on 6 May 2023:

Archbishop: Will you solemnly promise and swear to govern the Peoples of the United Kingdom of Great Britain and Northern Ireland, your other Realms and the Territories to any of them belonging or pertaining, according to their respective laws and customs?

King: I solemnly promise so to do.

Archbishop: Will you to your power cause Law and Justice, in Mercy, to be executed in all your judgements?

King: I will.

Archbishop: Will you to the utmost of your power maintain the Laws of God and the true profession of the Gospel? Will you to the utmost of your power maintain in the United Kingdom the Protestant Reformed Religion established by law? Will you maintain and preserve inviolably the settlement of the Church of England, and the doctrine, worship, discipline, and government thereof, as by law established in England? And will you preserve unto the Bishops and Clergy of England, and to the Churches there committed to their charge, all such rights and privileges as by law do or shall appertain to them or any of them?

King: All this I promise to do.

The King places his hand on the Bible.

King: The things which I have here before promised, I will perform and keep. So help me God.

==== Declaration Oath ====
This was the oath of declaration of Charles III during the coronation on 6 May 2023:

Archbishop: Your Majesty, are you willing to make, subscribe, and declare to the statutory Accession Declaration Oath?

King: I am willing. I Charles do solemnly and sincerely in the presence of God profess, testify, and declare that I am a faithful Protestant, and that I will, according to the true intent of the enactments which secure the Protestant succession to the Throne, uphold and maintain the said enactments to the best of my powers according to law.

The King signs copies of the Oaths, presented by the Lord Chamberlain.

==== Oath relating to the security of the Church of Scotland ====
The following oath was made by King Charles III at his Accession Council on 10 September 2022, in accordance with the Protestant Religion and Presbyterian Church Act 1707:

I, Charles the Third, by the Grace of God of the United Kingdom of Great Britain and Northern Ireland and of My other Realms and Territories, King, Defender of the Faith, do faithfully promise and swear that I shall inviolably maintain and preserve the Settlement of the true Protestant Religion as established by the Laws made in Scotland in prosecution of the Claim of Right and particularly by an Act intituled "An Act for securing the Protestant Religion and Presbyterian Church Government" and by the Acts passed in the Parliament of both Kingdoms for Union of the two Kingdoms, together with the Government, Worship, Discipline, Rights and Privileges of the Church of Scotland. So help me God.

=== Oath of Allegiance and Official Oath ===
A general Oath of Allegiance and Official Oath, are set out in the Promissory Oaths Act 1868 are required to be taken by various office-holders.

Members of the House of Commons or of the House of Lords are required to take the oath of allegiance in the House at the beginning of a new Parliament, as well as after a Demise of the Crown.

Section 84 of the Scotland Act 1998 requires members of the Scottish Parliament to take the Oath of Allegiance at a meeting of the Parliament. Members of the Scottish Government and junior Scottish Ministers are additionally required to take the Official Oath.

Section 20 of the Government of Wales Act 1998 requires members of the National Assembly for Wales to take the oath of allegiance. A Welsh form of the Oath is prescribed by the National Assembly for Wales (Oath of Allegiance in Welsh) Order 1999.

==== Oath of Allegiance ====
The Oath of Allegiance is in the following form:

I, (name), do swear that I will be faithful and bear true allegiance to His Majesty King Charles, his heirs and successors, according to law. So help me God.

==== Official Oath ====
The Official Oath is in the following form:

I, (name), do swear that I will well and truly serve His Majesty King Charles in the office of (office). So help me God.

=== Judicial Oath ===
The standard form of the judicial oath is set out in the Promissory Oaths Act 1868:

I, (name), do swear by Almighty God that I will well and truly serve our Sovereign Lord King Charles the Third in the office of (office), and I will do right to all manner of people after the laws and usages of this realm (or colony), without fear or favour, affection or ill will.

Those choosing affirm simply replace "do swear by Almighty God" with "solemnly sincerely and truly declare and affirm"

In Northern Ireland all references to the Sovereign were removed by the Justice (Northern Ireland) Act 2002.

Section 19(2) provides that the oath is—

I ... ... ... ... do swear that I will well and faithfully serve in the office of ... ... ... ... and that I will do right to all manner of people without fear or favour, affection or ill-will according to the laws and usages of this realm

Section 19(3) provides that the affirmation and declaration is—

I ... ... ... ... do solemnly and sincerely and truly affirm and declare that I will well and faithfully serve in the office of ... ... ... ... and that I will do right to all manner of people without fear or favour, affection or ill-will according to the laws and usages of this realm.

=== Armed forces ===
All persons enlisting in the British Armed Forces are required to attest to the following oath or equivalent affirmation:

I... swear by Almighty God (do solemnly, and truly declare and affirm) that I will be faithful and bear true allegiance to His Majesty King Charles III, His Heirs and Successors, and that I will, as in duty bound, honestly and faithfully defend His Majesty, His Heirs and Successors, in Person, Crown and Dignity against all enemies, and will observe and obey all orders of His Majesty, His Heirs and Successors, and of the generals (admirals / air officers) and officers set over me.

=== Privy Counsellors ===
Privy Counsellors take office on being "sworn of the Privy Council". It was formerly regarded as criminal to disclose the form of Privy Council oath, which includes an undertaking of secrecy as to the proceedings in Council (where the Oath is taken). On 20 July 1998 it was published by the President of the Council in answer to a written parliamentary question:

You do swear by Almighty God to be a true and faithful Servant unto the Queen's Majesty, as one of Her Majesty's Privy Council. You will not know or understand of any manner of thing to be attempted, done, or spoken against Her Majesty's Person, Honour, Crown, or Dignity Royal, but you will lett and withstand the same to the uttermost of your Power, and either cause it to be revealed to Her Majesty Herself, or to such of Her Privy Council as shall advertise Her Majesty of the same. You will, in all things to be moved, treated, and debated in Council, faithfully and truly declare your Mind and Opinion, according to your Heart and Conscience; and will keep secret all Matters committed and revealed unto you, or that shall be treated of secretly in Council. And if any of the said Treaties or Counsels shall touch any of the Counsellors, you will not reveal it unto him, but will keep the same until such time as, by the Consent of Her Majesty, or of the Council, Publication shall be made thereof. You will to your uttermost bear Faith and Allegiance unto the Queen's Majesty; and will assist and defend all Jurisdictions, Pre-eminences, and Authorities, granted to Her Majesty, and annexed to the Crown by Acts of Parliament, or otherwise, against all Foreign Princes, Persons, Prelates, States, or Potentates. And generally in all things you will do as a faithful and true Servant ought to do to Her Majesty. So help you God.

=== Constables declaration ===
A person appointed to the office of constable of a police force in Scotland is required to make the following declaration:

I hereby do solemnly and sincerely and truly declare and affirm that I will faithfully discharge the duties of the office of constable.

== United Nations ==
The Secretary General of the United Nations shall take their oath in general session of the General Assembly and it reads:

I, (name), solemnly swear to exercise in all loyalty, discretion and conscience, the function entrusted to me as Secretary General of the United Nations, to discharge these functions and regulate my conduct, with the interest of the United Nations only in view, and not in seek or to accept instructions, in regard to the performance of my duties, from any government or other authority, external to the organization.

== United States ==
=== History of the oath ===
While the oath-taking dates back to the First Congress in 1789, the current oath is a product of the 1860s, drafted by Civil War–era members of Congress intent on ensnaring traitors.

In 1789, the 1st United States Congress passed the Oath Administration Act to create an oath of office to fulfill the requirement of Article VI of the United States Constitution:

I do solemnly swear or affirm (as the case may be) that I will support the Constitution of the United States.

It also passed the Judiciary Act of 1789, which established an additional oath taken by federal judges:

I do solemnly swear (or affirm), that I will administer justice without respect to persons, and do equal right to the poor and to the rich, and that I will faithfully and impartially discharge and perform all the duties incumbent on me, according to the best of my abilities and understanding, agreeably to the Constitution, and laws of the United States. So help me God.

The outbreak of the Civil War quickly transformed the routine act of oath-taking into one of enormous significance. In April 1861, a time of uncertain and shifting loyalties, President Abraham Lincoln ordered all federal civilian employees within the executive branch to take an expanded oath. When Congress convened for a brief emergency session in July, members echoed the president's action by enacting legislation requiring employees to take the expanded oath in support of the Union. This oath is the earliest direct predecessor of the modern version of the oath.

When Congress returned for its regular session in December 1861, members who believed that the Union had as much to fear from northern traitors as southern soldiers again revised the oath, adding a new first section known as the "Ironclad Test Oath". The war-inspired Test Oath, signed into law on July 2, 1862, required "every person elected or appointed to any office ... under the Government of the United States ... excepting the President of the United States" to swear or affirm that they had never previously engaged in criminal or disloyal conduct. Those government employees who failed to take the 1862 Test Oath would not receive a salary; those who swore falsely would be prosecuted for perjury and forever denied federal employment.

The Ironclad Oath signed into law under President Johnson's term as mandatory for members of Congress as well as federal employees.

I, A.B., do solemnly swear (or affirm) that I have never voluntarily borne arms against the United States since I have been a citizen thereof; that I have voluntarily given no aid, countenance, counsel or encouragement to person engaged in armed hostility thereto; that I have neither sought nor accepted nor attempted to exercise the functions of any office whatever, under any authority or pretended authority in hostility to the United States; that I have not yielded a voluntary support to any pretended government, authority, power, or constitution within the United States, hostile or inimical thereto. And I do further swear (or affirm) that, to the best of my knowledge and ability, I will support and defend the Constitution of the United States, against all enemies, foreign and domestic; that I will bear true faith and allegiance to the same; and I take this obligation freely, without any mental reservation or purpose of evasion, and that I will well and faithfully discharge the duties of the office on which I am about to enter, so help me God.

The 1862 oath's second section incorporated a different rendering of the hastily drafted 1861 oath. Although Congress did not extend coverage of the Ironclad Test Oath to its own members, many took it voluntarily. Angered by those who refused this symbolic act during a wartime crisis, and determined to prevent the eventual return of prewar southern leaders to positions of power in the national government, congressional hard-liners eventually succeeded by 1864 in making the Test Oath mandatory for all members.

The Senate then revised its rules to require that members not only take the Test Oath orally, but also that they "subscribe" to it by signing a printed copy. This condition reflected a wartime practice in which military and civilian authorities required anyone wishing to do business with the federal government to sign a copy of the Test Oath. The current practice of newly sworn senators signing individual pages in an oath book dates from this period.

As tensions cooled during the decade following the Civil War, Congress enacted private legislation permitting particular former Confederates to take only the second section of the 1862 oath. An 1868 public law prescribed this alternative oath for "any person who has participated in the late rebellion, and from whom all legal disabilities arising therefrom have been removed by act of Congress." Northerners immediately pointed to the new law's unfair double standard that required loyal Unionists to take the Test Oath's harsh first section while permitting ex-Confederates to ignore it. In 1884, a new generation of lawmakers quietly repealed the first section of the Test Oath, leaving intact the current affirmation of constitutional allegiance.

=== Federal executive and legislative branch oaths ===
In the United States, the oath of office for the President is specified in the Constitution (Article II, Section 1):

I do solemnly swear (or affirm) that I will faithfully execute the Office of President of the United States, and will to the best of my Ability, preserve, protect and defend the Constitution of the United States.

The oath may be sworn or affirmed (in which case it is called an affirmation instead of oath). Although not present in the text of the Constitution, it is customary for modern presidents to say "So help me God" after the end of the oath. For officers other than the President, the expression "So help me God" is explicitly prescribed, but the Judiciary Act of 1789 also explains when it can be omitted (specifically for oaths taken by court clerks): "Which words, so help me God, shall be omitted in all cases where an affirmation is admitted instead of an oath."

The Constitution (Article VI, clause 3) also specifies:

The Senators and Representatives before mentioned, and the members of the several state legislatures, and all executive and judicial officers, both of the United States and of the several states, shall be bound by oath or affirmation, to support this Constitution; but no religious test shall ever be required as a qualification to any office or public trust under the United States.

At the start of each new U.S. Congress, in January of every odd-numbered year, newly elected or re-elected Members of Congress – the entire House of Representatives and one-third of the Senate – must recite an oath:

I, (name), do solemnly swear (or affirm) that I will support and defend the Constitution of the United States against all enemies, foreign and domestic; that I will bear true faith and allegiance to the same; that I take this obligation freely, without any mental reservation or purpose of evasion; and that I will well and faithfully discharge the duties of the office on which I am about to enter. So help me God.

This oath is also taken by the Vice President, members of the Cabinet, federal judges and all other civil and military officers and federal employees other than the President.

=== Federal judiciary oaths ===
In the United States, federal judges are required to take two oaths. The judicial oath is this:

I, (name), do solemnly swear (or affirm) that I will administer justice without respect to persons, and do equal right to the poor and to the rich, and that I will faithfully and impartially discharge and perform all the duties incumbent upon me as (office) under the Constitution and laws of the United States. [So help me God.]

The other is the same oath that all other officers of the United States (save the President) take:

I, (name), do solemnly swear (or affirm) that I will support and defend the Constitution of the United States against all enemies, foreign and domestic; that I will bear true faith and allegiance to the same; that I take this obligation freely, without any mental reservation or purpose of evasion; and that I will well and faithfully discharge the duties of the office on which I am about to enter. [So help me God.]

Federal statute specifically says that the latter oath "does not affect other oaths required by law."

=== Military oaths – federal and state ===
The military oath is the same as the one taken by members of the Congress, judicial officers, and all other officers except for the President. Members of the United States National Guard, however, take an additional oath as well.

=== State and local oaths ===
The oaths of state and local officials are largely patterned on the federal oath of constitutional allegiance, with the addition of fidelity to the state constitution. An example would be the oath taken by all New York government officials:

I, [name], do solemnly swear (or affirm) that I will support and defend the Constitution of the United States, and the Constitution of the State of New York, (and the Charter of the City of New York, e.g.), and that I will faithfully discharge the duties of the office of (mayor of the City of New York, e.g.) to the best of my ability.[So Help me God.]

=== Territorial oaths ===
The oath of territories of the United States are required to support the constitution.

The example is taken by the Governor of Guam:

I, [name], do solemnly swear in the presence of the Almighty God, that I will well and faithfully support the Constitution of the United States, the laws of the United States applicable to [name of territory] and the laws of [name of territory], that I will consciously and impartially discharge the duties as [position]. So help me God.

== Uruguay ==
In Uruguay, before taking office, the President and Vice President are required by Article 158 of the Constitution to take an affirmation before General Assembly in joint session:

In Spanish:

Yo, (name), me comprometo por mi honor a desempeñar lealmente el cargo que se me ha confiado y a guardar y defender la Constitución de la República

In English:

I, (name), pledge on my honor to loyally carry out the position entrusted to me and to uphold and defend the Constitution of the Republic.

The National Representatives and Senators take the Oath based on the regulations of the respective Chamber: In Spanish:

President of the Chamber: ¿Promete usted por su honor desempeñar debidamente el cargo de Representante Nacional/Senador y obrar en todo conforme a la Constitución de la República?

Representative/Senator: Sí, prometo.

President of the Chamber: ¿Promete usted guardar secreto en todos los casos en que sea ordenado por la Cámara o por la Asamblea General?

Representative/Senator: Si, prometo.

In English:

President of the Chamber: Do you promise on your honor to duly carry out the position of National Representative/Senator and to act in all accordance with the Constitution of the Republic?

Representative/Senator: Yes, I promise.

President of the Chamber: Do you promise secrecy in all cases ordered by the House or by the General Assembly?

Representative/Senator: Yes, I promise.

== Venezuela ==
The President of Venezuela, upon assumption of the office on his inauguration, is asked by the President of the National Assembly (until 1999, the Senate President, on behalf of the entire National Federal Congress), holding a copy of the Constitution of Venezuela, the following:

Before God and the Fatherland, Do you swear therefore to perform the duties of the position of Constitutional President of the Bolivarian Republic of Venezuela, and in the performance of your duties fulfill the Constitution and laws of the Republic?

With the right hand on the shoulder level he answers with a "Yes, I swear" and the President then responds: "If you do so, before God and the Fatherland your duties will be performed, and it will be demanded of you if you not. Therefore, in the name of the Republic and by the authority of the law, I invest you as Constitutional President of the Republic as of this moment for this term period." Then the Presidential Sash (with the colors and coat of arms from the Flag of Venezuela and the collar of the Order of the Liberatiors is turned over to him from the outgoing President, but if the case is that of succession due to death of office of his predecessor both items are cased and are given to him by the National Assembly President instead. If reelected the method is the same as after the sudden death of the President while in office.

== Vietnam ==
According to 2013 Constitution, the President of Vietnam, Prime Minister of Vietnam, President of the National Assembly of Vietnam and Chief Justice of the Supreme People's Court of Vietnam must take an oath of office every first plenary session of the National Assembly following their election.

The following is the oath taken by the President, Prime Minister, President of the National Assembly and Chief Justice:

"Under the sacred red flag with a yellow star of the Fatherland, before the National Assembly, our compatriots, and voters nationwide, I – the President/Prime Minister/President of the National Assembly/Chief Justice of the Supreme People’s Court of the Socialist Republic of Vietnam – do solemnly swear to be absolutely loyal to the Fatherland, to the People, and to the Constitution of the Socialist Republic of Vietnam; and to strive with utmost dedication to successfully fulfill all duties entrusted to me by the Party, the State, and the People."

After the Oath is taken, the President of the National Assembly (or the Standing Vice President of the National Assembly if the oath taker is the President of the National Assembly) will say, "The National Assembly has confirmed this oath."

== Catholic Church ==
The Roman Catholic Church requires all of its clergy before ordination and most of those promoted to positions of authority to make a profession of faith, as follows. It is very similar to the Apostles' Creed and the Nicene Creed (referred to as the Symbol of Faith).

I, (name), with firm faith believe and profess everything that is contained in the Symbol of Faith: namely:

I believe in one God, the Father, the Almighty, of heaven and earth, of all that is seen and unseen. I believe in one Lord, Jesus Christ, the only Son of God, eternally begotten of the Father, God from God, Light from Light, true God from true God, begotten not made, one in Being with the Father. Through him all things were made. For us men and for our salvation, he came down from heaven: by the power of the Holy Spirit he became incarnate of the Virgin Mary, and became man. For our sake he was crucified under Pontius Pilate; he suffered death and was buried. On the third day he rose again in accordance with the Scriptures; he ascended into heaven and is seated at the right hand of the Father. He will come again in glory to judge the living and the dead, and his kingdom will have no end. I believe in the Holy Spirit, the Lord, the giver of life, who proceeds from the Father and the Son. With the Father and the Son he is worshiped and glorified. He has spoken through the Prophets. I believe in one holy catholic and apostolic Church. I acknowledge one baptism for the forgiveness of sins. I look forward to resurrection of the dead, and the life of the world to come. Amen.

With firm faith, I also believe everything contained in the Word of God, whether written or handed down in Tradition, which the Church, either by a solemn judgement or by the ordinary and universal Magisterium, sets forth to be believed as divinely revealed.

I also firmly accept and hold each and everything definitively proposed by the Church regarding teaching on faith and morals.

Moreover, I adhere with religious submission of will and intellect to the teachings which either the Roman pontiff or the College of Bishops enunciate when they exercise their authentic Magisterium, even if they do not intend to proclaim these teachings by a definitive act.

Further, all of those promoted to positions of authority (vicars general, judicial vicars, episcopal vicars, pastors of parishes and superiors within religious orders) or with teaching responsibilities (rectors of seminaries, professors at seminaries, heads or Catholic universities or professors on the faculties of Catholic colleges and universities who teach subjects involving religion), and all those ordained deacons (and therefore all those who will also later be ordained priests) to take the following "Oath of Fidelity"

I, (name), in assuming the office of (office), promise that in my words and in my actions I shall always preserve communion with the Catholic Church.

With great care and fidelity I shall carry out the duties incumbent on me toward the Church, both universal and particular, in which, according to the provisions of the law, I have been called to exercise my service.

In fulfilling the charge entrusted to me in the name of the Church, I shall hold fast to the deposit of faith in its entirety; I shall faithfully hand it on and explain it, and I shall avoid any teachings contrary to it.

I shall follow and foster the common discipline of the entire Church and I shall maintain the observance of all ecclesiastical laws, especially those contained in the Code of Canon Law.

With Christian obedience I shall follow what the Bishops, as authentic doctors and teachers of the faith, declare, or what they, as those who govern the Church, establish.

I shall also faithfully assist the diocesan Bishops, so that the apostolic activity, exercised in the name and by mandate of the Church, may be carried out in communion with the Church.

So help me God, and God's Holy Gospels on which I place my hand.

== See also ==
- Coronation Oath Act 1688
- Dikastes § Oath
- Hong Kong Legislative Council oath-taking controversy
- List of U.S. presidential swearing-ins
- Oath of allegiance
- Oath of citizenship
- Oath of enlistment
