= Kalpavriksha =

Legendary Tree in Hinduism

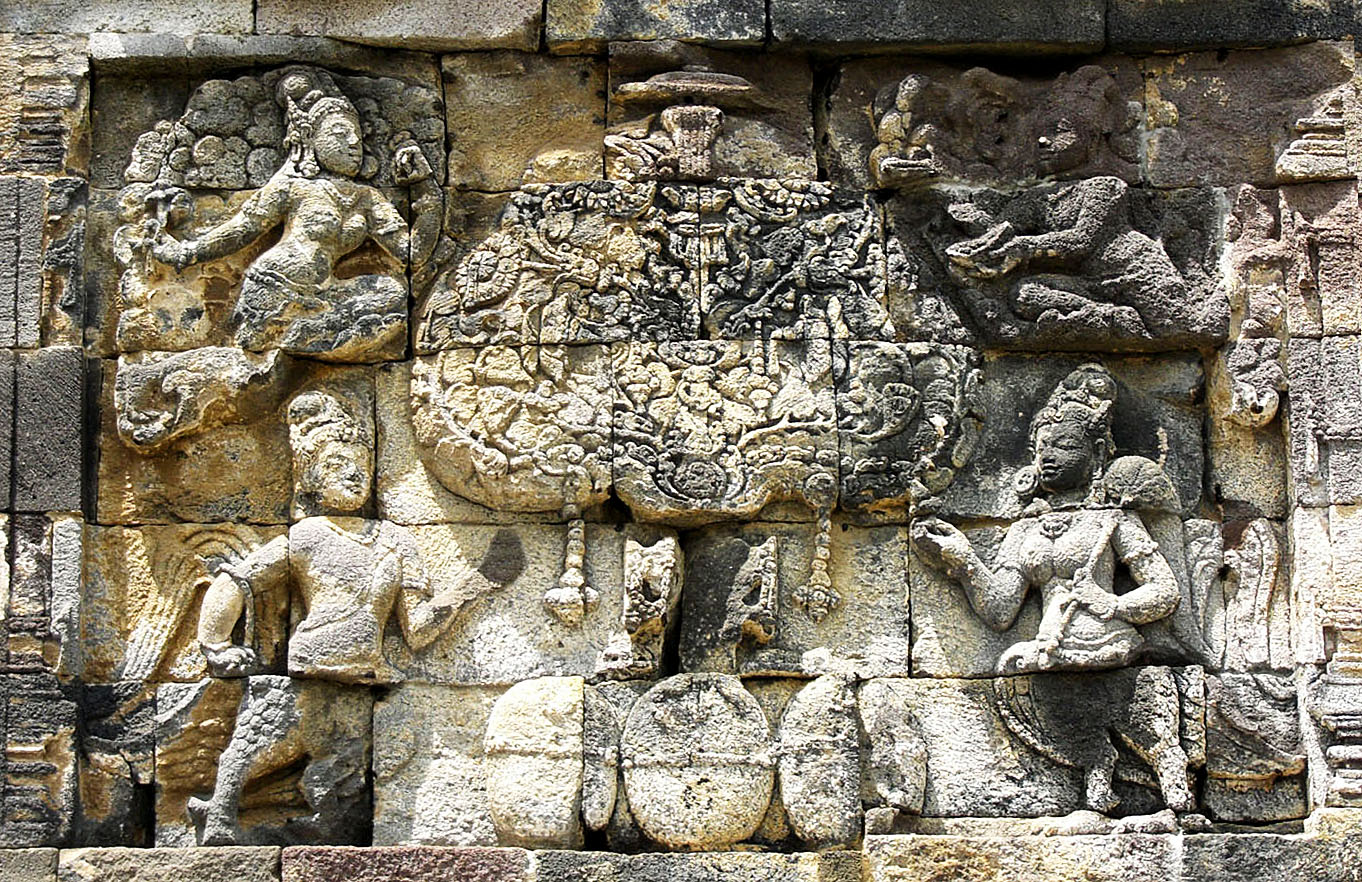
Kalpataru, the divine tree of life being guarded by mythical creatures at the 8th century Pawon temple, a Buddhist temple in Java, Indonesia.

Kalpavriksha (Note: Also known as kalpataru, kalpadruma, kalpa vruksham, kalpapādapa, and karpaga vriksham.) (Sanskrit: कल्पवृक्ष, lit. 'Aeon tree', Kalpavṛkṣa) is a wish-fulfilling divine tree in religions like Hinduism, Jainism, and Buddhism. In Buddhism, another term, ratnavṛkṣa (jeweled tree), is also common. Its earliest descriptions are mentioned in Sanskrit literature. It is also a popular theme in Jain cosmology and Buddhism.

The Kalpavriksha originated during the Samudra Manthana or the "churning of the ocean" along with Kamadhenu, the divine cow, providing for all needs. The king of the gods, Indra, returned with this tree to his paradise. Kalpavriksha is also identified with many trees such as parijata (Nyctanthes arbor-tristis), Ficus benghalensis, Acacia, Madhuca longifolia, Prosopis cineraria, Diploknema butyracea, and mulberry tree (Morus nigra tree). The tree is also extolled in iconography and literature.

== History ==
Kalpavriksha is common to the Hindu Bhagavatas, the Jains, and the Buddhists.

=== Hinduism ===
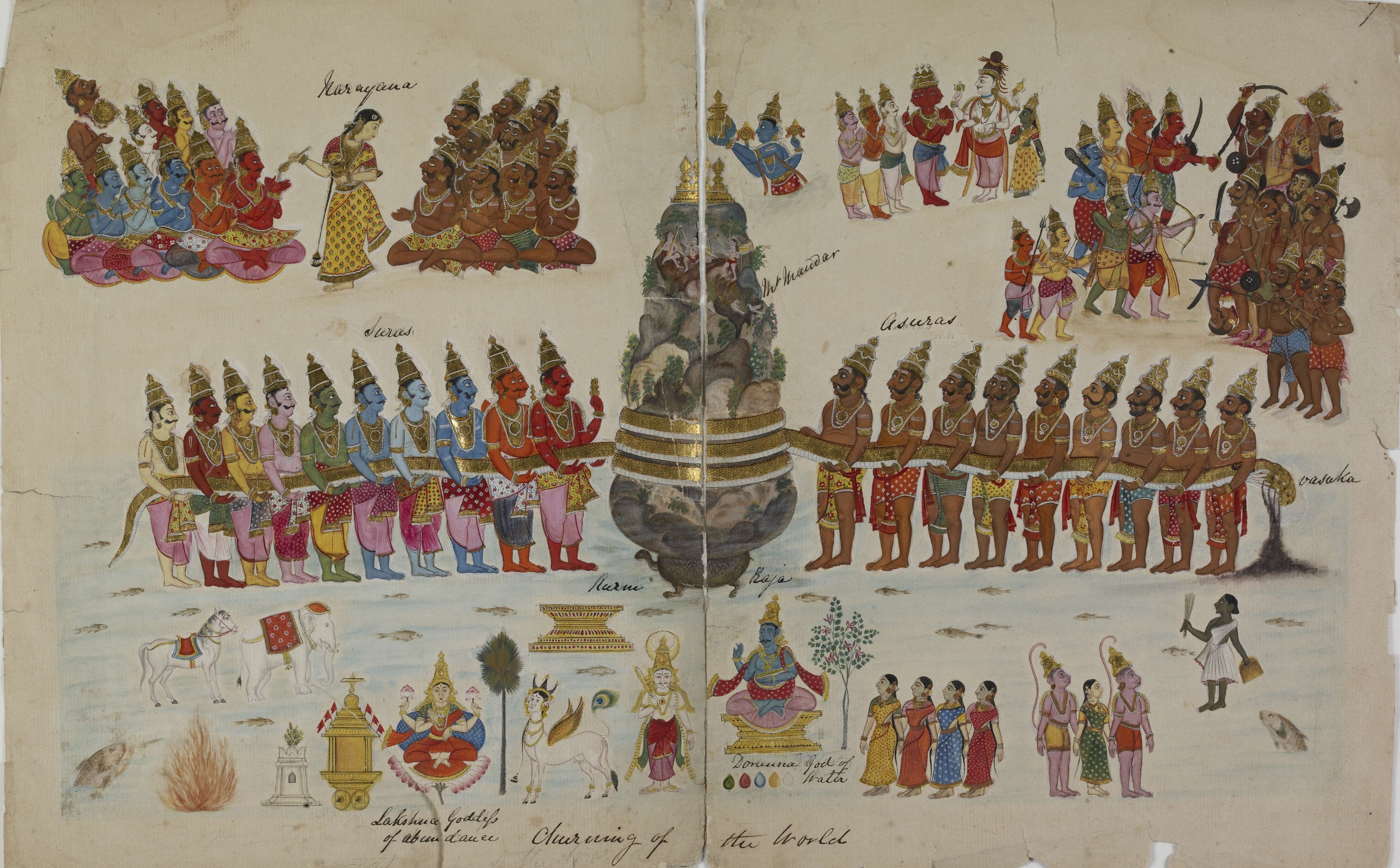
Depiction of a tree– beside the God of Water (bottom centre)– possibly kalpavriksha, that emerged during the Samudra Manthana. Also depicted is Parijata, beside Lakshmi.

Kalpavriksha, the tree of life, also meaning "World Tree", finds mention in the Vedic scriptures. In the earliest account of the Samudra Manthana, or the "churning of the ocean of milk". Kalpavriksha emerged from the primal waters during the ocean churning process along with Kamadhenu, the divine cow that bestows all needs. The tree is also said to be the Milky Way or the birthplace of the stars Sirius. The king of the devas, Indra, returned with this Kalpavriksha to his abode in paradise and planted it there. The tree also finds mention in the Sanskrit text Mānāsara, part of Shilpa Shastras.

Another story says that Kalpavriksha was located on earth and was transported to Indra's abode after people started misusing it by wishing evil things. In Indra's "Devaloka" it is said that there are five Kalpavrikshas, which are called Mandana, Parijata, Santana, Kalpavriksha, and Harichandana, all of which fulfill various wishes. Kalpavriksha, in particular, is said to be planted at Mt. Meru peak in the middle of Indra's five paradise gardens. It is on account of these wish-granting trees that the asuras waged a perpetual war with the devas as the heavenly gods who exclusively benefited freely from the "divine flowers and fruits" from the Kalpavriksha, whereas the asuras lived comparatively in penury at the lower part of its "trunk and roots". The Parijata is often identified with its terrestrial counterpart, the Indian coral tree (Eyrthrina indica), but is most often depicted like a magnolia or frangipani (Sanskrit: champaka) tree. It is described as having roots made of gold, a silver midriff, lapis lazuli boughs, coral leaves, pearl flower, gemstone buds, and diamond fruit. It is also said that Ashokasundari was created from a Kalpavriksha tree to provide relief to Parvati from her loneliness.

In some versions of Hindu mythology, Shiva and Parvati, after many painful discussions while parting with their daughter Aranyani, gave her away to the divine Kalpavriksha for safekeeping when the demon Andhakasura waged war. Parvati requested Kalpavriksha to bring up her daughter with "safety, wisdom, health and happiness," and to make her Vana Devi, the protector of forests.

=== Jainism ===
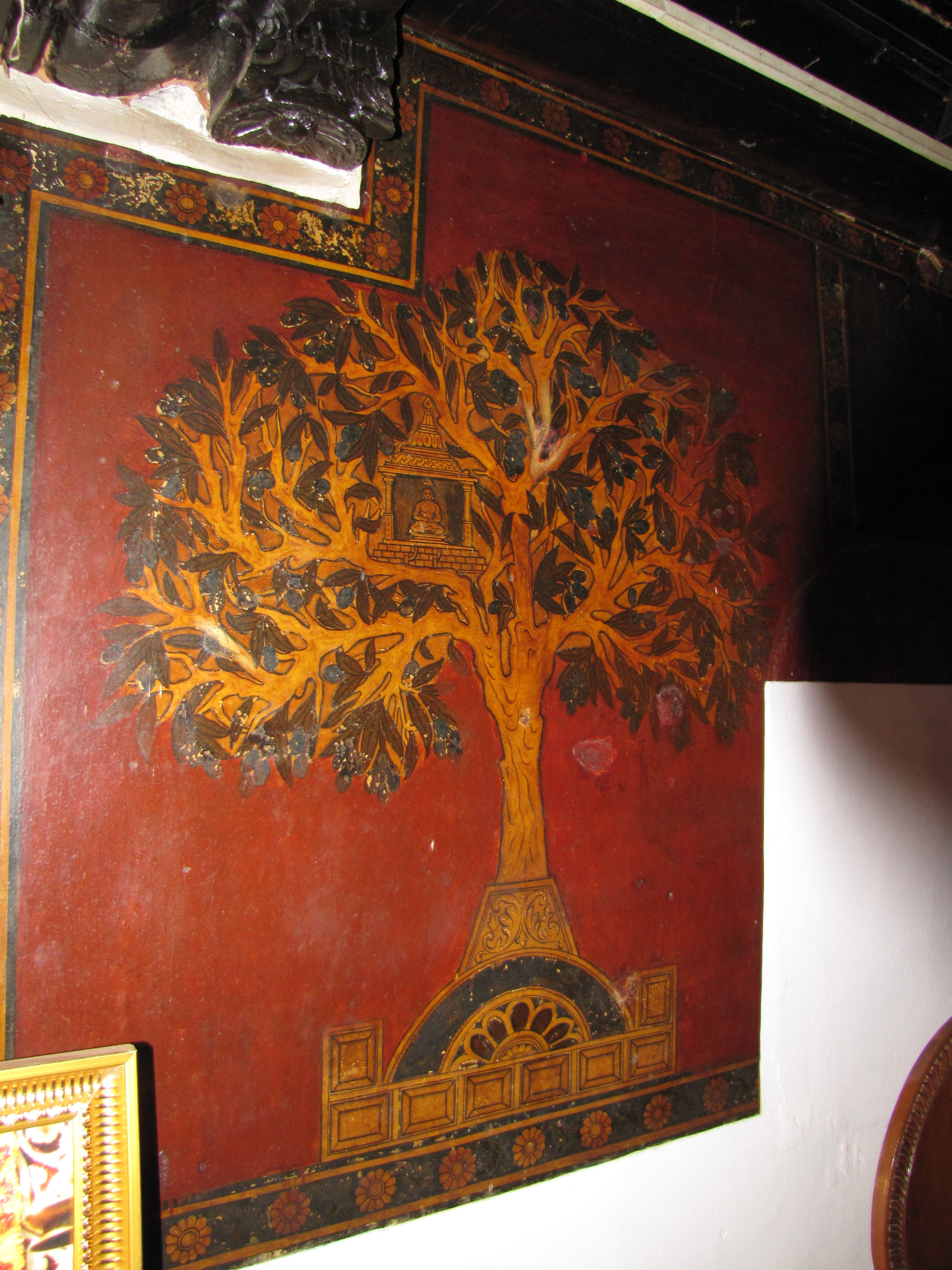
Wall painting of Kalpavruksha in Saavira Kambada Basadi, Moodbidri, Karnataka

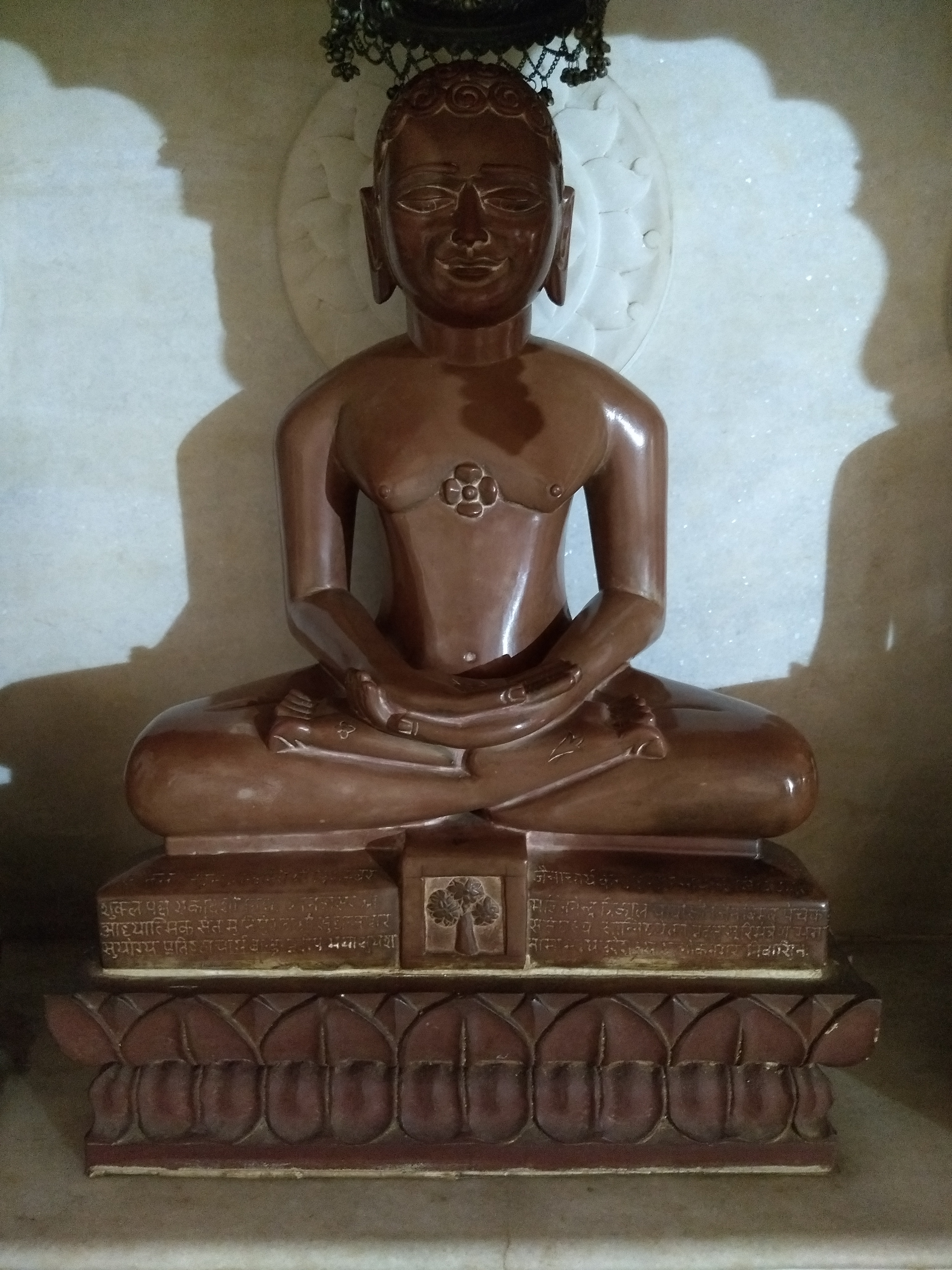
Idol of 10th Jain Tirthankara Shitalanatha with his symbol of Kalpavriksha below

In Jain Cosmology Kalpavrikshas are wish-granting trees which fulfill the desires of people in the initial stages of a world cycle. In initial times children are born in pairs (boy and girl) and don't do any karma. There are 10 Kalpavrikshas which grant 10 distinct wishes such as an abode to reside, garments, utensils, nourishment including fruits and sweets, pleasant music, ornaments, fragrant flowers, shining lamps and a radiant light at night.

According to Jain cosmology, in the three Aras (unequal periods) of the descending arc (Avasarpini), Kalpavrikshas provided all that was needed, but towards the end of the third ara, the yield from them diminished. Eight types of these trees are described in some texts, each of which provided different objects. Thus from the "Madyanga tree" delicious and nutritious drinks could be obtained; from the "Bhojananga", delicious food; from "yotiranga", light more radiant than the sun and the moon; while from "Dopanga" came indoor light. Other trees provided homes, musical devices, table ware, fine garments, wreaths and scents.

The Tiloya Panatti give the following list: Pananga, Turiyanga, Bhusananga, Vatthanga, Bhoyanga, Alayanga, Diviyanga, Bhayananga, Malanga, Tejanga with drinks, music, ornaments, garments, edibles and ready-made dishes, mansions to live in, lamps, utensils and garlands of flowers respectively while the last type, namely Tejanga, seems to be self-luminous, serving the purpose of heavenly luminaries.

=== Buddhism ===
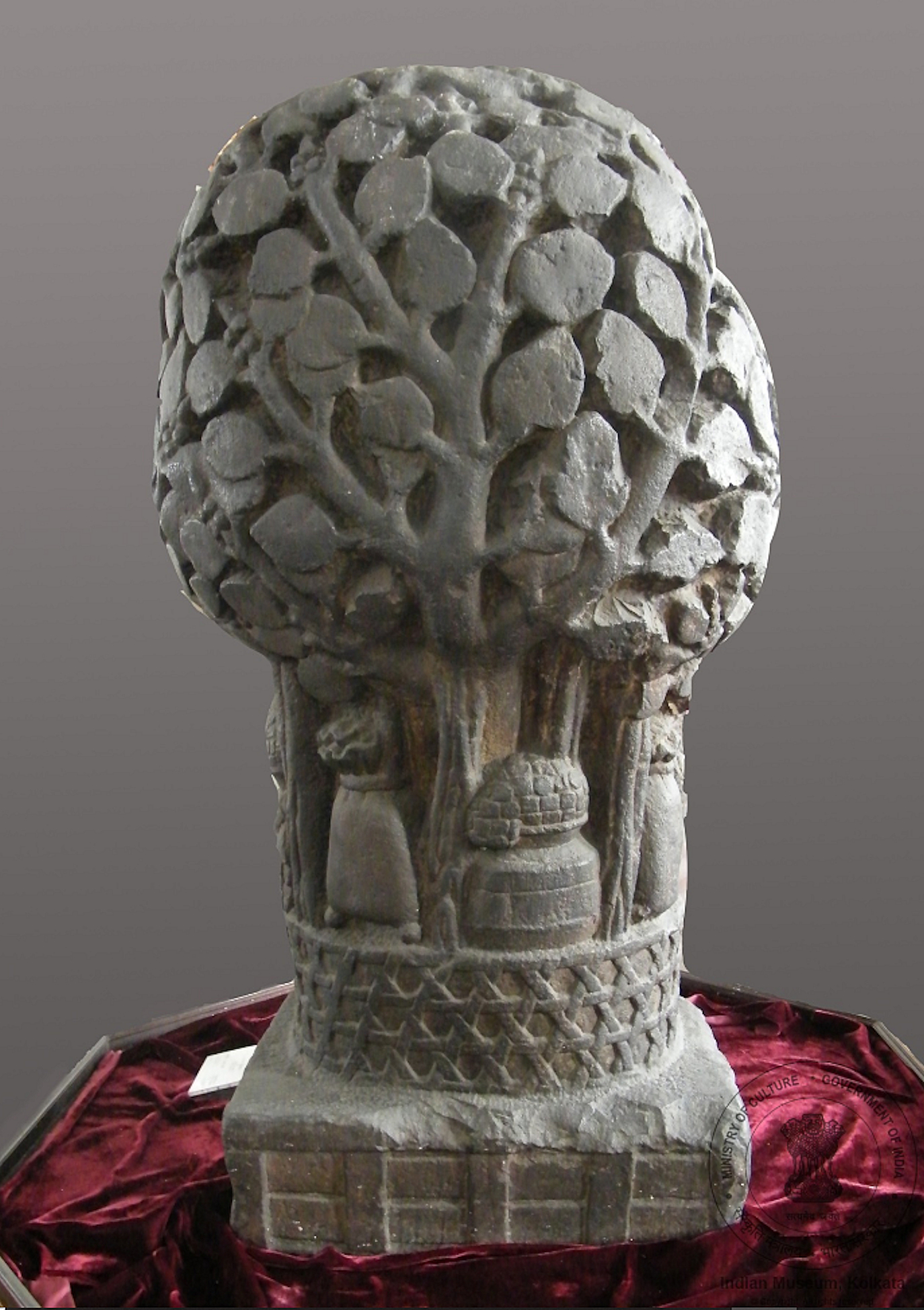
Besnagar Kalpadruma

In Buddhism a small wish granting tree is depicted decorating the upper part of the "long-life vase" held by "longevity deities" like Amitayus and Ushnishavijaya. The goddess Shramana devi holds jeweled branch of Kalpavriksha in her left hand.

Worship of the Nyagrodha tree as a form of non-human worship is depicted in a Buddhist sculpture at Besnagar. This sculpture in Besnagar, also known as Vidisa (Bhilsa), is dated to third century BC and is exhibited in the Calcutta Museum.

In Myanmar, where Theravada Buddhism is practiced, the significance of the Kalpavriksha is in the form of an annual ritual known as Kathina (presenting a robe) in which the laity present gifts to the monks in the form of money trees. At the kingdom of Ketumati's front gates, it is thought four Kalpavrikshas will spring up from the Earth and provide enough valuables to satisfy all of Jambudvīpa for years.

== Identification with trees ==
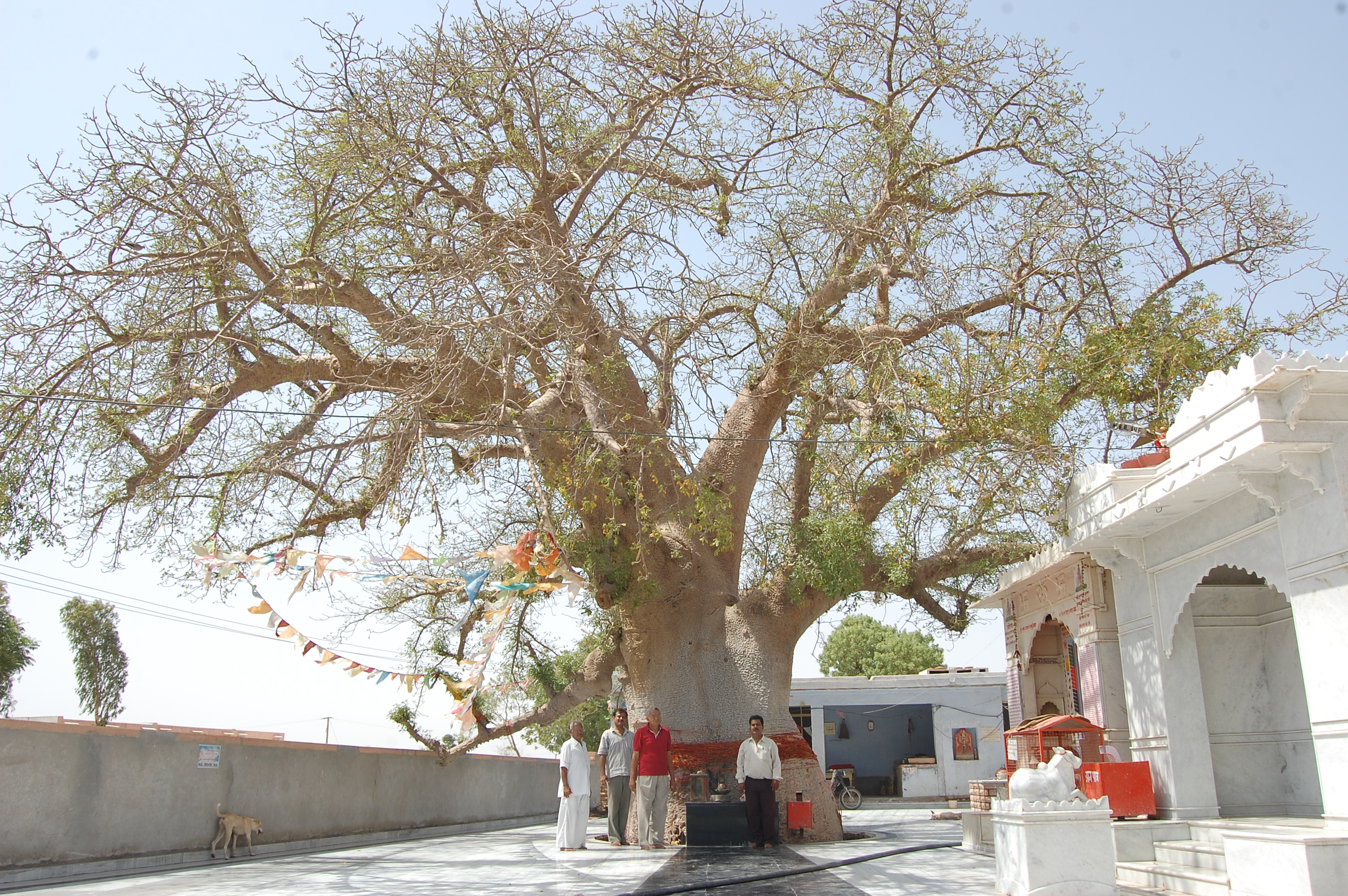
Kalpavriksha Tree at Bilara, Rajasthan

In different states of India some trees are specifically referred to as the Kalpavriksha:

Mahura tree (Madhuca longifolia) in Maharashtra, India holds an important place in the day-to-day life of the tribal people. It is like the Kalpavriksha wish tree called madhu (Madhuca indica).

The banyan tree (Ficus benghalensis), also called Nyagrodha tree, grows throughout India and is referred to as Kalpavriksha or Kalpataru because of its ability to amply provide for human needs.

The coconut tree (Cocos nucifera) found in most regions of the country is called "Kalpavriksha", as every part of it is useful in one way or the other. The coconut water inside the nut is a drink. In dried form it is called copra and is used to manufacture oil. The coconut husk, called coir, is used to make rope. Leaves are used to make huts, fans, mats. Palm sugar is made from budding flower. The dried midrib is used to make boats.

Ashwatha tree (sacred fig tree) is also known as Kalapvriksha where the deities and Brahma are stated to reside, and it is where sage Narada taught the rishis on the procedure for worshipping the tree and its usefulness.

Shami tree (Prosopis cineraria), found in desert areas of the country, called in local dialect as Ajmer or jaant is called Kalpavriksha. In Rajasthan desert area its roots go deep to a depth of 17–25 metres (56–82 ft). This checks the erosion of the sandy soil of the desert. For this reason the tree stays green even during drought conditions. People of Rajasthan hence regard this tree as Kalpavriksha, because in times of drought when no grass or fodder can be found the animals are sustained by eating its green leaves.

Chyur tree grows in the high altitudes of the Himalayas at an altitude between 500 and 1000 m. Known as the Indian butter tree (Diploknema butyracea), it is called a Kalpavriskha, or tree of paradise by the people of the mountainous region as it yields honey, jaggery, and ghee. Its canopy grows in the shape of an umbrella.

In Joshimath in Uttarakhand a mulberry tree, which is said to be 2400 years old, is renowned and revered as the Kalpavriksha as it was the location where, in the 8th century, Adi Sankaracharya did penance under the tree as he considered it an incarnation of Lord Shiva. It is also believed that sage Durvasa meditated under this tree, in Urgam. The mountain slopes of Kailasa are stated to have a profusion of Kalpavrikshas.

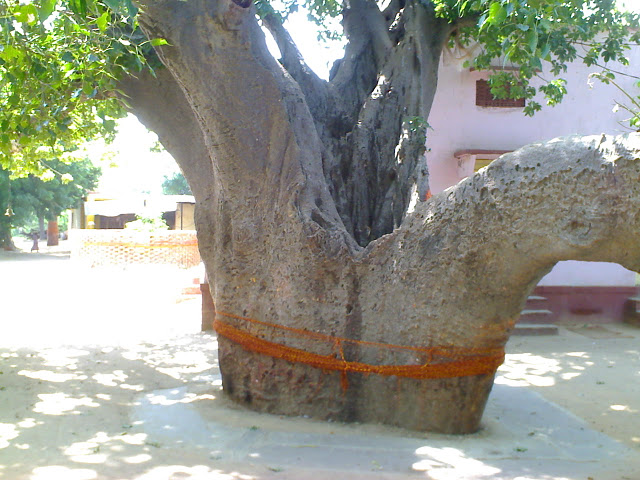
Kalpavriksha in Mangaliyawas (near Ajmer, Rajasthan in India)

At Mangaliyawas near Ajmer, Rajasthan, there are two revered trees (Male and Female) which are more than 800 years old, known as Kalpavrikshas. They are worshipped on an Amavasya day in the Hindu month of Shraavana.

In Ranchi, Jharkhand, there are three Kalpavrikshas. They are at a locality called Hinoo.

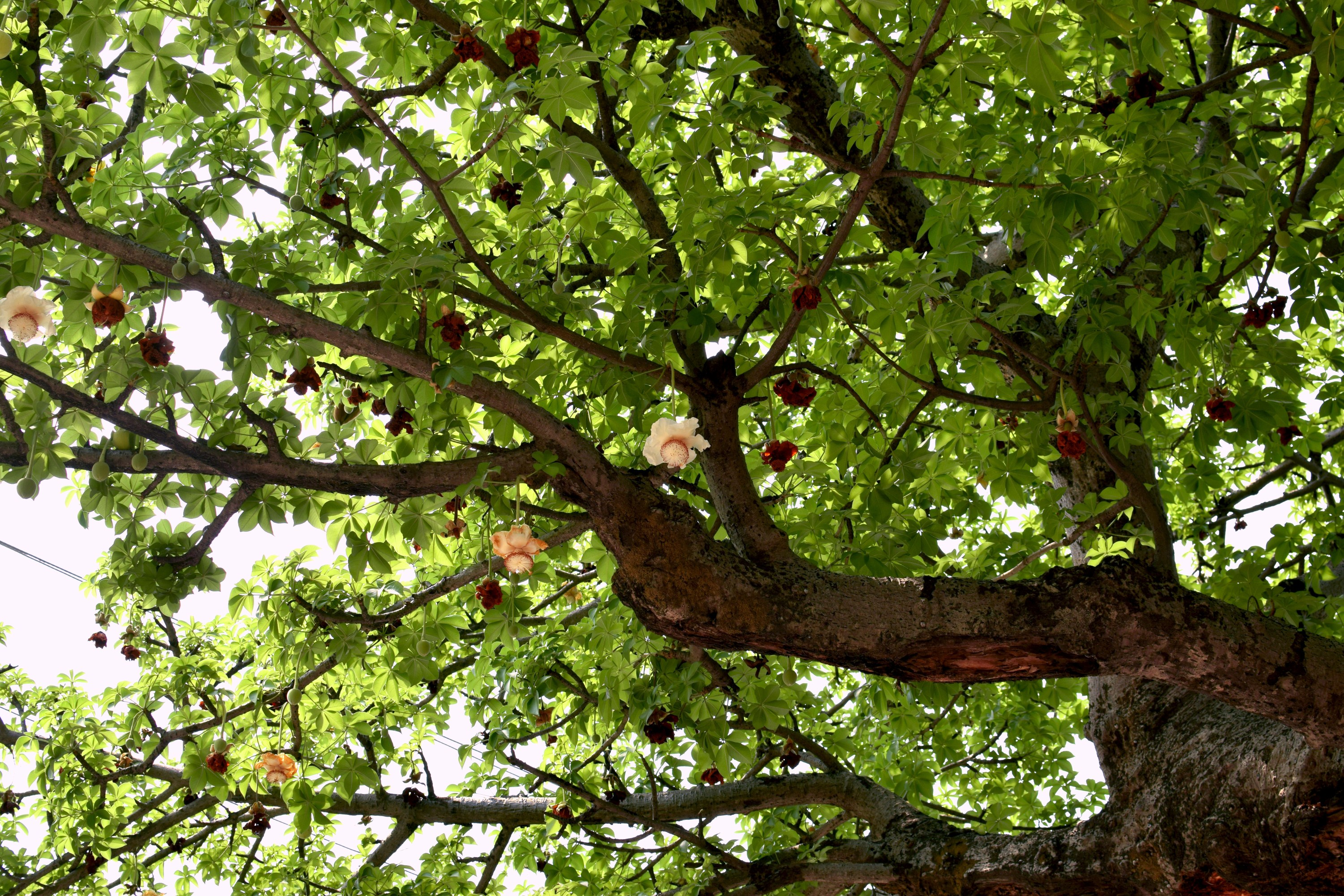
Kalpavriksha with Flowers in Ranchi, Jharkhand

In Tamil Nadu's culture, tala (Borassus flabellifer) a variety of Palmyra palm (Borassus), also known as toddy, is referred to as Kalpataru as all its parts have a use. This tree is also native to Asia and South East Asia, has normally a life span of 100 years, grows up to 20 metres (66 ft) height; its leaves in the shape of a fan are rough texture. The leaves were used for writing in the ancient times.

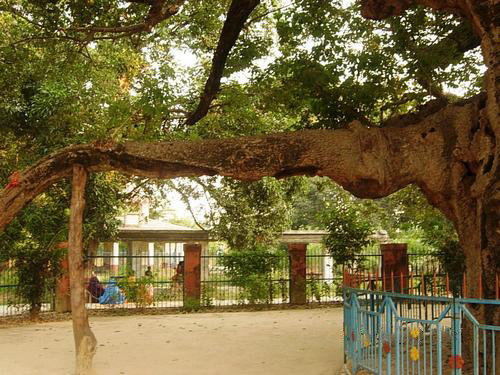
Parijata tree at Kintoor, Barabanki.

In the Harivansh Puraan, the Parijata, baobab tree, is called a Kalpavriksha, or wish bearing tree, which apart from the village of Kintoor, near Barabanki, Uttar Pradesh, is believed to be only found in heaven. The tree has mythological link with prince Arjuna of the Pandava clan who is said to have brought it from heaven. His mother Kunti after whom the village Kintoor is named used to offer flowers from this tree to worship Lord Shiva. It is also said that Lord Krishna brought this tree from heaven to please his wife Satyabhama.

Kalpalatha is another wish fulfilling tree, a creeper, which was extolled during the later part of the Aryan period. It is said that a person standing below this tree would be blessed with beautiful ornaments, dresses and even unmarried girls.

In Thailand, pink shower tree (Cassia bakeriana) is also called the Kalpavriksha or Kanlapaphruek in local dialect. It is believed to be the tree of success.

== Iconography ==
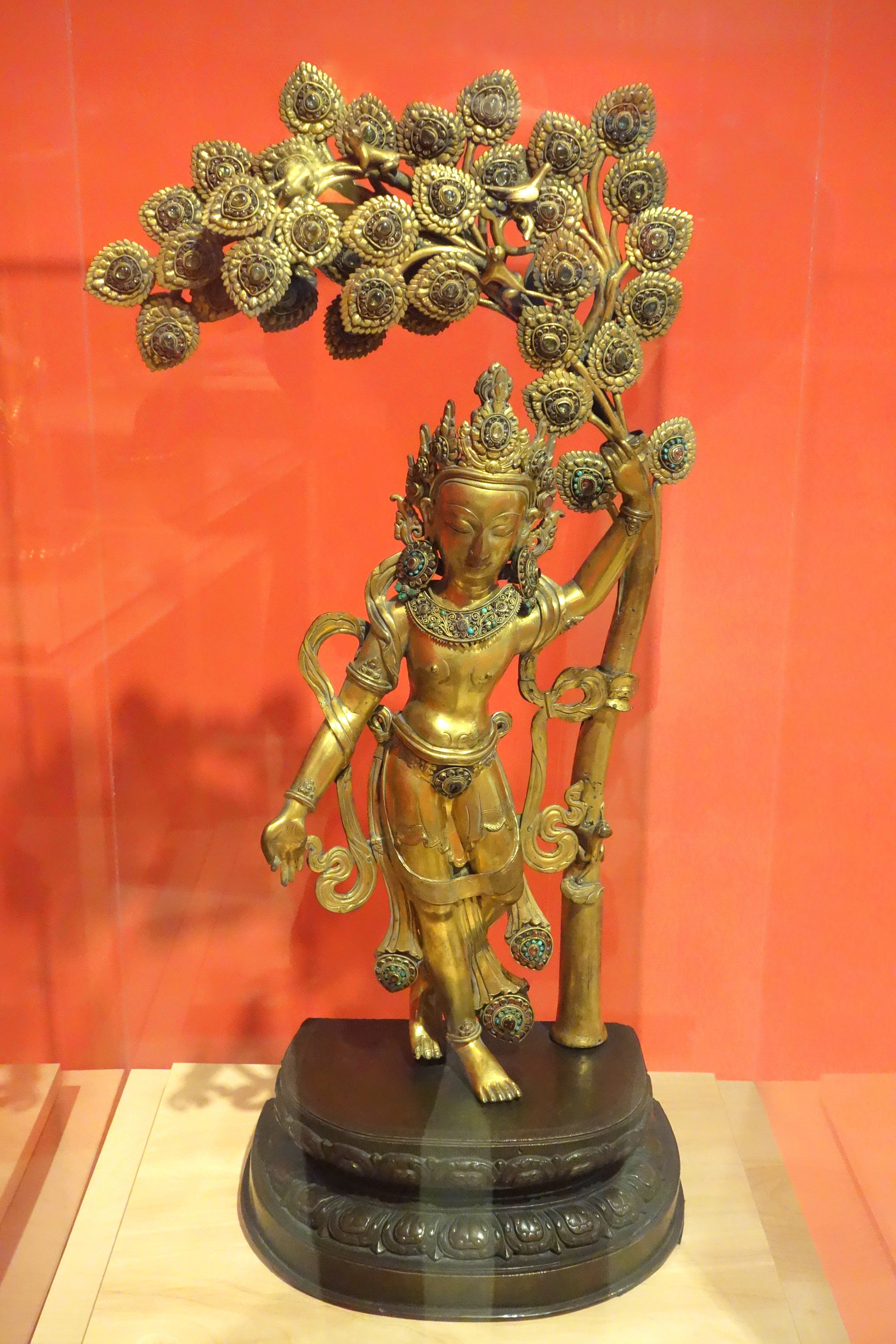
Cinatamani Lokesvara with a kaprabrikshya, 19th century, gilt bronze, semiprecious stones

In iconography, Kalpavriksha, the wish-fulfilling tree, is painted within a picture of a landscape, decorated with flowers, silks, and suspended with jewellery. It is a pattern which has a prominent symbolic meaning. Ornamental Kalpavriksha design was a feature that was adopted on the reverse of the coins and sculptures in the Gupta period.

Kalpavriksha is also dated to the Dharmachakra period of Buddhism. The paintings of this period depicting the tree with various branches and leaves have a female figure painted on its top part. The female figure is painted from mast upwards holding a bowl in her hand. Similar depiction of female figure with tree representing it as presiding deity was a notable feature during the Sunga period as seen in the image of "Salabhanvka" in the railing pillars.

In most paintings of Kalpavriksha Shiva and Parvati are a common feature. It forms a canopy over Shiva. In one painting Paravati is paying obeisance to Lord Shiva with her hands held up in adoration when she is blessed with a stream of water from the Kalpavriksha.

== Literature ==
A Kalpavriksha is mentioned in the Sanskrit work Mānāsara as a royal insignia. In Hemādri's work Caturvargacīntama, the Kalpavriksha is said to be a tree of gold and gem stones.

In poetry Kalpavriksha is compared to Lakshmi as its sister emerging from the sea. It is born to the Naga King Kumuda, the fifth descendant of Takshaka, along with his sister Kumudavati. It emerged from below the bed of the Sarayu river challenging Kusa considered an incarnation of Vishnu just in the disguise as a son.

Kalidasa, in his poetry Meghadūta epitomizing wish-fulfilling trees found in the capital of the Yaksha king extols the virtues of Kalpavriksha as "the dainties and fineries for the fair women of Alaka, coloured clothes for the body, intoxicating drinks for exciting glances of the eyes, and flowers for decorating the hair and ornaments of various designs".

== See also ==
- Hindu- Buddhism related
  - Kalpataru Day
  - Cassia fistula, the Golden Shower Tree which is special in Thai culture.
  - Dictionary of Hindu Lore and Legend
- Sacred related
    - Akshayavata
  - Sacred trees
    - Bodhi Tree
    - Largest Banyan trees
    - Sacred groves
    - Sacred groves of India
    - Trees in mythology
    - Tree worship
  - Sacred mountains
  - Sacred natural site
  - Sacred rivers
  - Sacred site
- General
  - Tree of life
