= Hendua =

Hendua (also Hendua chutchuta) is an Indian cuisine of Western Odisha that is normally consumed as pickle or seasoning, garnished as a liquor when fermented and eaten with roasted or fried tomatoes. Hendua is hard-sundried or pickled (allowing fermentation) bamboo shoot (locally known as "karadi") that is eaten alone and also by adding with other dishes, both fresh and stored as pickle. New sprouts of bamboo culms that are procured from bamboo-forests by locals are sliced and pickled. They are fried to prepare the dish. Many locals and indigenous people generally use hendua for making curries. Hendua is generally produced in households and sold in village haats.

== Medicinal use ==
Hendua is also arguably used for its medicinal values. It is mixed with mahua seed oil for body massage during common cold of both humans and cattle. Fried hendua is consumed with old jaggery for gastric trouble of cattle.
