= Mahuli (wine) =

Mahuli (Odia : ମହୁଲି) is a flower wine used by Tribals in Odisha, Jharkhand. Its prepared from the Mahula (ମହୁଲ) flower. Mahuli wine is an indigenous drink also called mahuwa (or mahua).

== Origins ==
Tribal people of Bastar in Chattishgarh and Western & Northern part of Odisha, Santhals of Jharkhand and Tribal people of North Maharashtra, consider the tree and the Mahua drink as part of their cultural heritage. It is an obligatory item during celebration and evening activities.

== Preparation ==
Water, the flowers of the Mahula tree and sugar are the main ingredient used for preparation. A fistful of urea fertilizer is added to the mash to be the yeast nutrient. The flowers are mashed and fermented to make Mahuli. Pure Mahuli is almost transparent and has a distinct, easily identified smell. Alcohol content in pure Mahuli is about 25-45% depending on the number of distillation processes it has gone through. Mahuli is strong in the drink. Indigenous people usually take it raw. It can be used to make cocktails or mixed with water to dilute it.
