= Diploknema sebifera =

Conservation status
- Least Concern (IUCN 3.1)

Scientific classification
- Kingdom: Plantae
- Clade: Embryophytes
- Clade: Tracheophytes
- Clade: Spermatophytes
- Clade: Angiosperms
- Clade: Eudicots
- Clade: Asterids
- Order: Ericales
- Family: Sapotaceae
- Genus: Diploknema
- Species: D. sebifera

Binomial name
- Diploknema sebifera Pierre

Species of tree

Diploknema sebifera is a plant in the family Sapotaceae. It grows as a tree up to 40 m (130 ft) tall, with a trunk diameter of up to 60 cm (24 in). The bark is greyish brown. Inflorescences bear up to 10 reddish brown flowers. The fruit is ellipsoid, up to 6 cm (2.4 in) long. Its habitat is mixed dipterocarp forests from sea level to 300 metres (1,000 ft) altitude. Diploknema sebifera is native to Peninsular Malaysia and Borneo.
