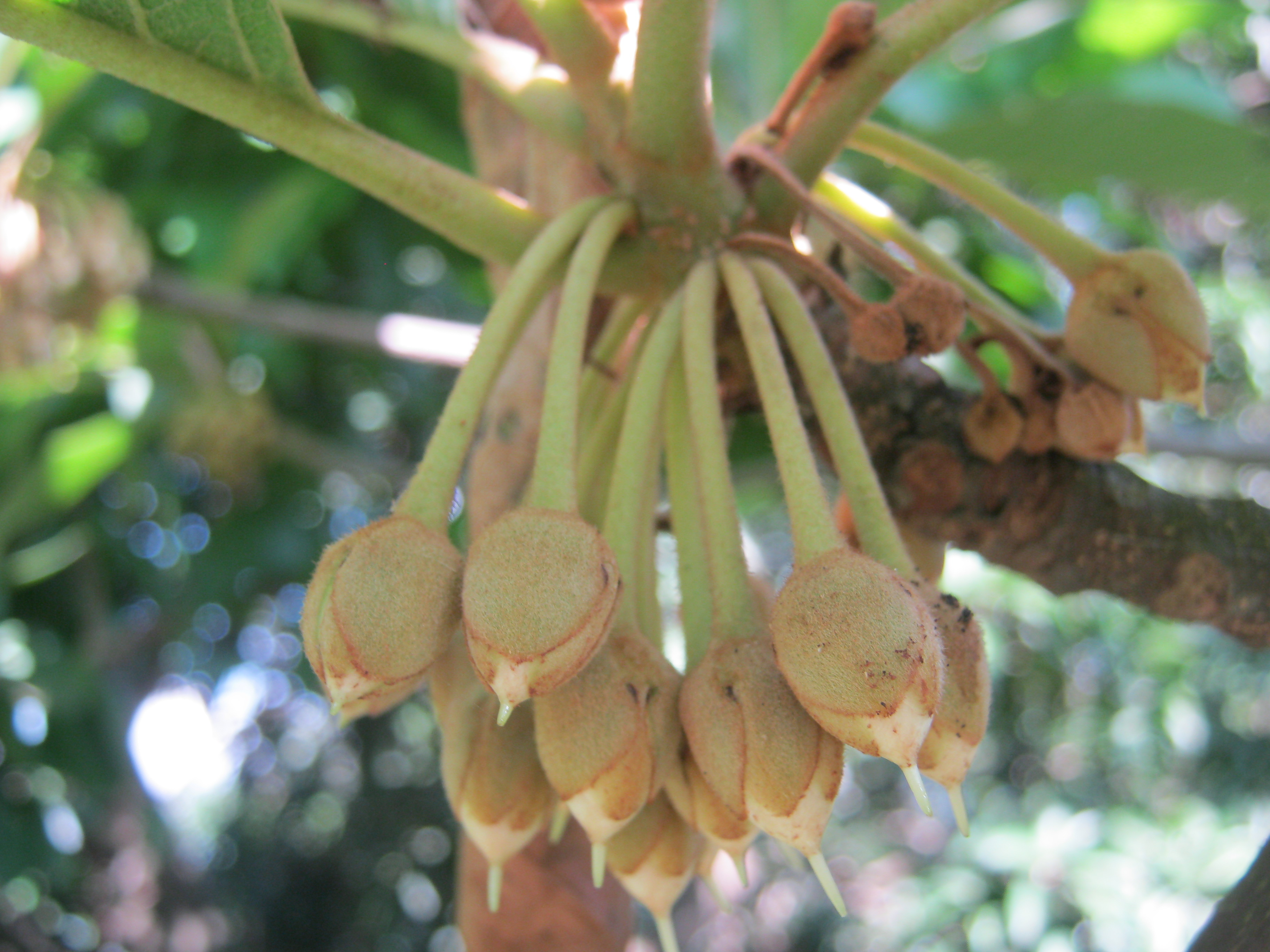
- Flower of Diploknema butyracea

Scientific classification
- Kingdom: Plantae
- Clade: Tracheophytes
- Clade: Angiosperms
- Clade: Eudicots
- Clade: Asterids
- Order: Ericales
- Family: Sapotaceae
- Subfamily: Sapotoideae
- Genus: Diploknema; Pierre

Synonyms
- Mixandra Pierre ex L.Planch.

= Diploknema =

Genus of trees

Diploknema is a genus of plant in the Sapotaceae described as a genus in 1884.

Diploknema is native to Southeast Asia, the Himalayas, and southwestern China.

Species

1. Diploknema butyracea (Roxb.) H.J.Lam - Uttarakhand, Nepal, Sikkim, Bhutan, Assam, Tibet, Andaman Islands
2. Diploknema butyraceoides (M.B.Scott) H.J.Lam - Uttarakhand, Nepal, Sikkim, Bhutan, Assam, Myanmar
3. Diploknema oligomera H.J.Lam - Aceh, Maluku
4. Diploknema ramiflora (Merr.) H.J.Lam - Luzon
5. Diploknema sebifera Pierre - Peninsular Malaysia, Borneo
6. Diploknema siamensis Fletcher - southern Thailand
7. Diploknema yunnanensis D.D.Tao, Z.H.Yang & Q.T.Zhang - Yunnan
