= Ketumati =

Legendary place in Buddhism

Ketumati (Ch'ih-t'ou) is a legendary place in some Buddhist traditions viewed as the earthly paradise of the prophesied figure called Maitreya, who is the future Buddha. Devotees of Maitreya believe that the kingdom is a pure land where Maitreya and his future parents will preside upon his descent from the Tusita Heaven to Earth. They believe that he will also bring a utopian era upon his devotees. Ketumati is sometimes associated with the city of Banaras in Uttar Pradesh, India. It is referenced in the Cakkavatti Sīhanāda Sutta.

== Description ==
Ketumati is described as being a kingdom better than any cities of the gods. It will be seven yojanas wide and twelve yojanas long. Brilliant gardens full of trees will make the city radiant, and they, together with lakes and ponds, will be enough to keep its citizens happy. It will be encompassed by seven strong walls. One of them will be constructed from seven types of gems that will be so bright, people won't be able to tell if it is day or night. Others will be made from pure gold, lapis lazuli and another material called masaragalla. Between these walls, seven sets of palm trees composed of various gems will appear. Four gem gates will be located at Ketumati's four direction points and brighten the entire city. In front of these gates, four Kalpavriksha trees carrying goods that'll flourish for years to come, will sprout up from the Earth. No person will need to live inside huts built from wood as everyone in Ketumati will have palaces made from seven kinds of gems. In its time, the entire region of Jambudvipa will not suffer from hunger or need any forms of cultivation as the world will be peaceful, and even beyond this, due to Ketumati's merits, all of its people will have safety, as those who inhabit it will be virtuous. The other kingdoms in Jambudvipa will be pleasant at this time as well and their men and women will bathe in ponds with banks of white sand. Ketumati's streets will be clean and there will be storied buildings and pavilions above them. Their doors and windows will be made out of different types of jewels, covered by pearl nets. Outside Ketumati there will be a strong Dragon King named Duo-luo-shi-qi, whose palace is located in a nearby pond. He used to shower at midnight, but after reaching Ketumati, he no longer needed to, as filth had disappeared. The ground of Ketumati will be composed of gold, with pillars made of pearl, which were granted to the people of Ketumati due to their good deeds, all of whom will be benevolent. In the ponds, gardens and groves of Ketumati the water will be pure, covered by blue, red, white, purple and multicolored lotus flowers. On the four sides of the ponds there are steps composed of four types of jewels. All types of birds will come to these ponds. Fruit trees and fragrant trees will cover the countryside of Ketumati, receiving rain timely. The citizens of Ketumati will not worry about calamities such as flooding, thievery, fires, wars, poison, old age or famine because at this time the world will be in a state of peace.

== Disambiguations ==
- Ketumati is a river in India, that flows in between Vipula and the mount Nalika on the north of the stream.
- Ketumati (the Pali name for the Burmese city of Taungoo) was the capital of the Jeyyavaddhana country, founded by king Mahasirijeyyasura around 1510 AD.
