= Irumbai Mahaleswarar Temple =

Hindu temple in Tamil Nadu, India

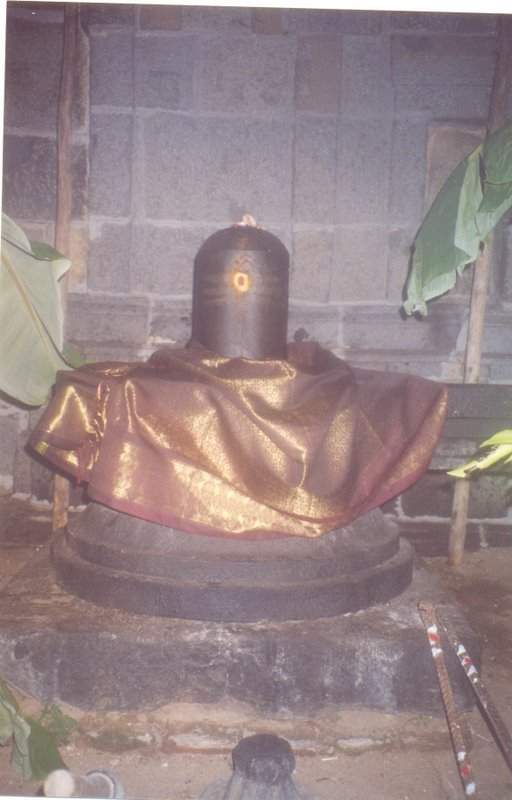
An ancient Linga at the Irumbai Mahaleswarar Temple

Irumbai Mahaleswarar Temple is a Hindu temple located at Irumbai in Vanur taluk in Villupuram district, Tamil Nadu, India. The presiding deity is Shiva. He is called as Maakaleswarar. His consort is known as Kuyilmozhi Ammai.

== Significance ==
It is one of the shrines of the 275 Paadal Petra Sthalams - Shiva Sthalams glorified in the early medieval Tevaram poems by Tamil Saivite Nayanar Sambandar.
