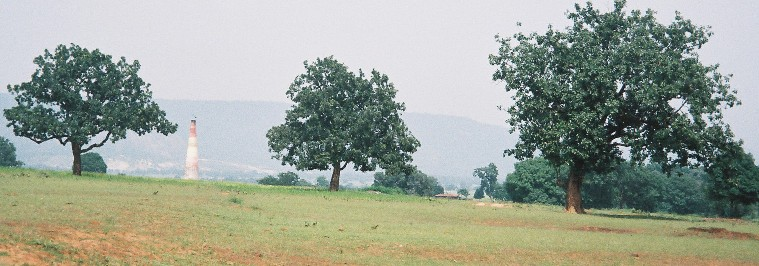

Scientific classification
- Kingdom: Plantae
- Clade: Tracheophytes
- Clade: Angiosperms
- Clade: Eudicots
- Clade: Asterids
- Order: Ericales
- Family: Sapotaceae
- Genus: Madhuca
- Species: M. longifolia

Binomial name
- Madhuca longifolia (J.Konig) J.F.Macbr.

= Madhuca longifolia =

Species of tree

Madhuca longifolia is a tropical tree native to the Indian subcontinent and Myanmar, occurring in India, Bangladesh, Nepal, Sri Lanka and Myanmar. It is commonly known as madhūka, mahura, madkam, mahuwa, Butter Tree, mahura, mahwa, mahua, mohulo, Iluppai, Mee or Ippa-chettu. It is a fast-growing tree that grows to approximately 20 meters in height, possesses evergreen or semi-evergreen foliage, and belongs to the family Sapotaceae. It is adaptable to arid environments, being a prominent tree in tropical mixed deciduous forests in India in the states of Maharashtra, Odisha, Chhattisgarh, Jharkhand, Uttar Pradesh, Bihar, Andhra Pradesh, Madhya Pradesh, Kerala, Gujarat, West Bengal and Tamil Nadu.

== Uses ==
It is cultivated in warm and humid regions for its oleaginous seeds (producing between 20 and 200 kg of seeds annually per tree, depending on maturity), flowers and wood. The fat (solid at ambient temperature) is used for the care of the skin, to manufacture soap or detergents, and as a vegetable butter. It can also be used as a fuel oil. The seed cakes obtained after extraction of oil constitute very good fertilizer. The flowers are used to produce an alcoholic drink in tropical India. This drink is also known to affect animals. Several parts of the tree, including the bark, are used for their medicinal properties. It is considered holy by many tribal communities because of its usefulness.

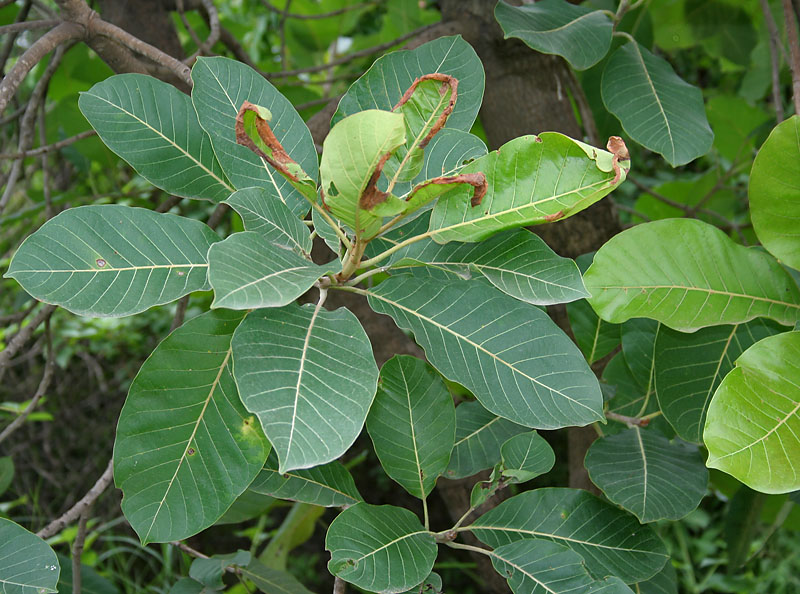
M. longifolia in Hyderabad, India

The leaves of Madhuca indica (= M. longifolia) are fed on by the moth Antheraea paphia, which produces tassar silk, a form of wild silk of commercial importance in India. Leaves, flowers and fruits are also lopped to feed goats and sheep. The seed oil of 'Madhuca indica' can be utilize to synthesize polymer resin. In one of the attempts, it has been used to prepare alkyd type of polyurethane resins, which are used as a good source of anticorrosion organic coatings.

The Tamils have several uses for M. longifolia (iluppai in Tamil). The saying "aalai illaa oorukku iluppaip poo charkkarai" indicates when there is no cane sugar available, the flower of M. longifolia can be used, as it is very sweet. However, Tamil tradition cautions that excessive use of this flower will result in imbalance of thinking and may even lead to lunacy.

The alkaloids in the press cake of mahura seeds is reportedly used in killing fishes in aquaculture ponds in some parts of India. The cake serves to fertilise the pond, which can be drained, sun dried, refilled with water and restocked with fish fingerlings.

== Mahura flowers ==
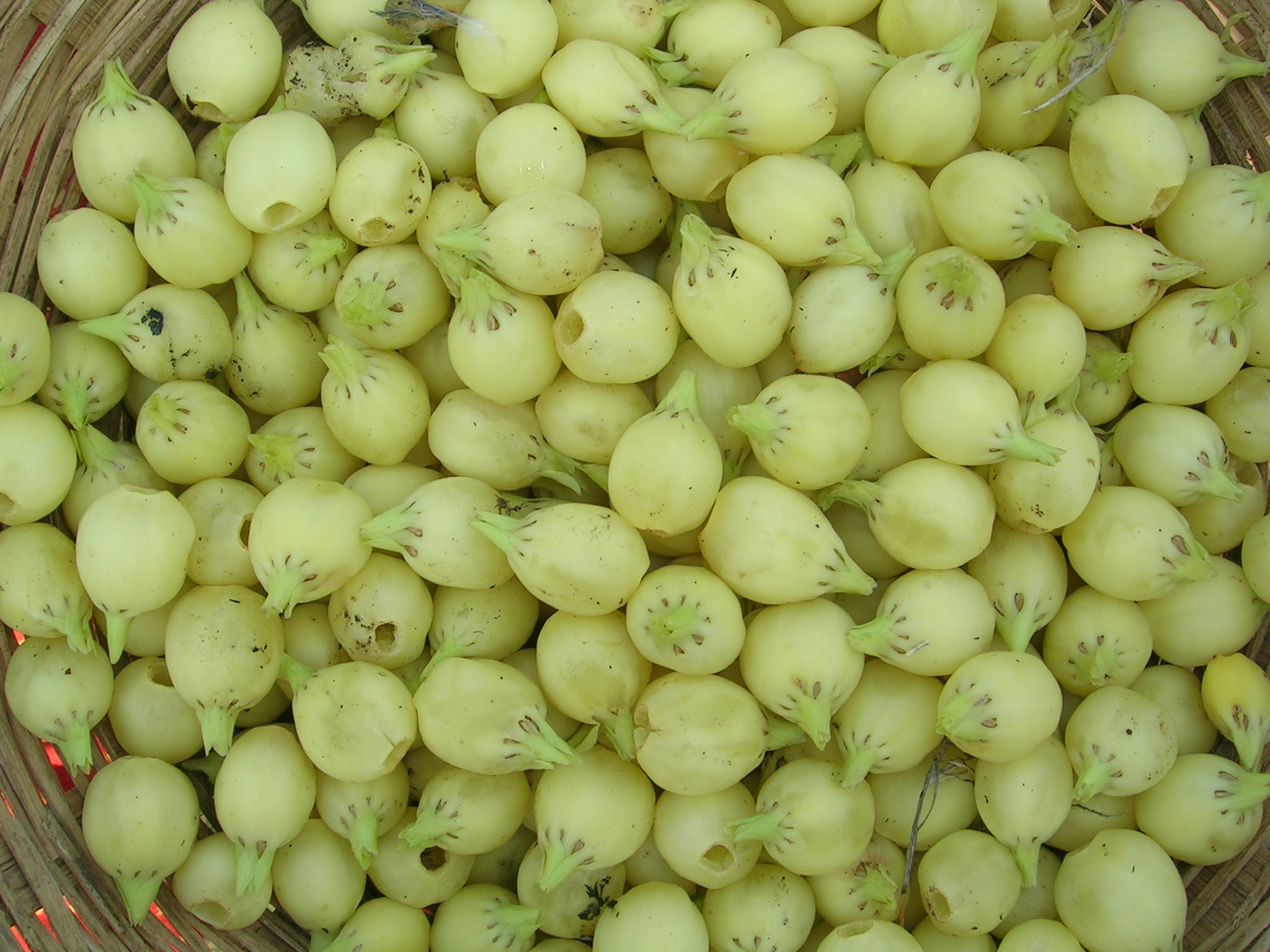
Mahura flowers

The mahura flower is edible and is a food item for indigenous peoples. Indian tribes have been making mahua – the name of the liquor as well as the tree – for centuries. They use it to make syrup for medicinal purposes.

Mahura flowers are rich in sugars. The flowers are also fermented to produce the alcoholic beverage also known as mahura wine. Indigenous people in the central belt of India such as of Dahanu, Maharashtra, Surguja and Bastar in Chhattisgarh and peoples of Western Orissa, Santhals of Santhal Paraganas (Jharkhand), Koya tribals of North-East Andhra Pradesh and Bhil tribals in western Madhya Pradesh consider the tree and the mahura drink as part of their cultural heritage. Mahura is an essential drink for tribal men and women during celebrations.

Mahura fruit are an essential food of Maharashtra, Western Odisha and the people of the central belt of India. The tree has a great cultural significance. There are many varieties of food prepared with its fruits and flowers. Also in Maharashtra, Western Odisha people used to pray to this tree during festivals. The spirit produced from the flowers is largely colourless, opaque and not very strong. It is inexpensive and the production is largely done in home stills.

Mahura flowers are also used to manufacture jam, which is made by tribal co-operatives in the Gadchiroli district of Maharashtra.

In many parts of Bihar, such as villages in the district of Siwan, the flowers of mahura tree are sun-dried; these sun-dried flowers are ground to flour and used to make various kinds of breads.

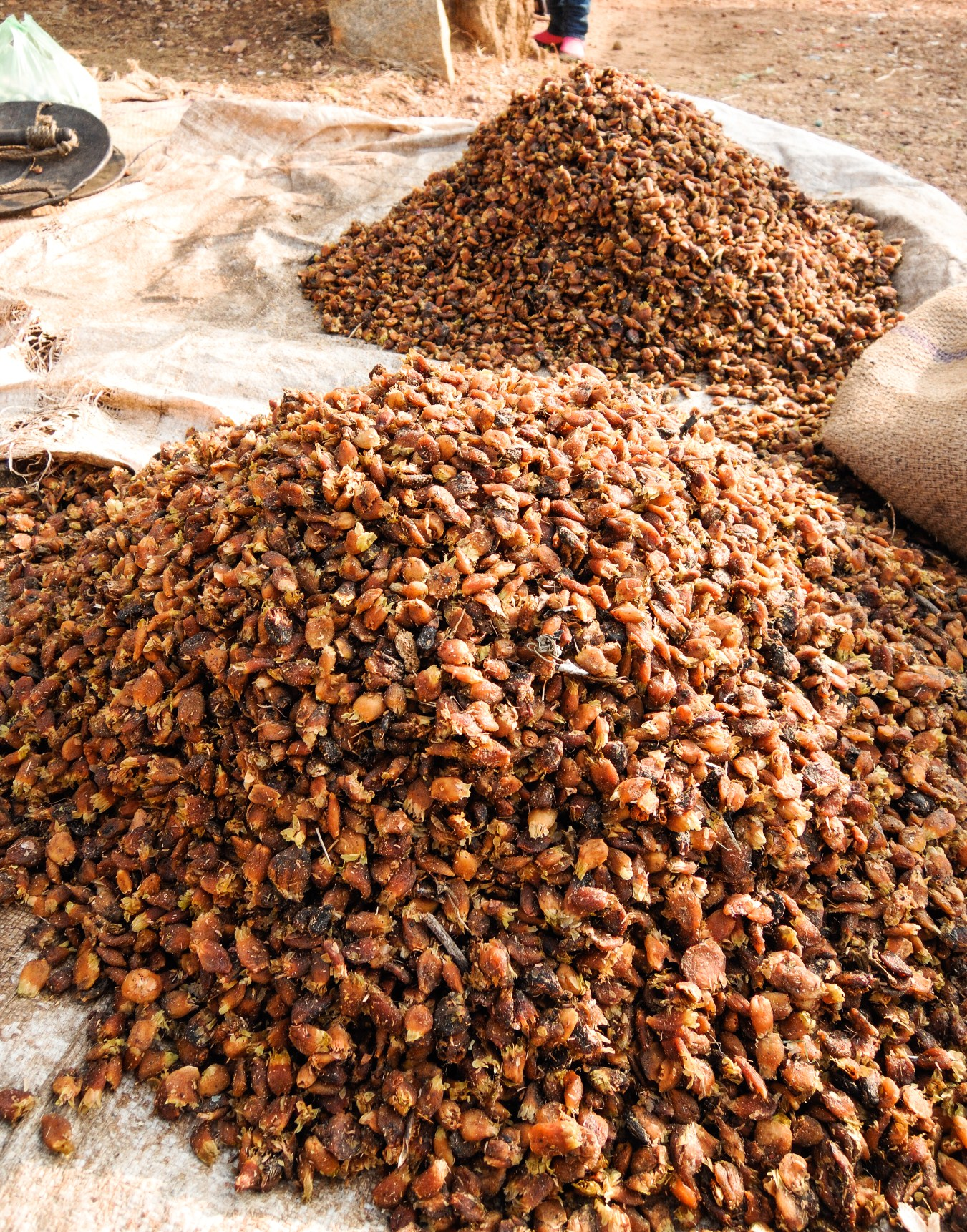
Mahura flowers are locally used to make wine.

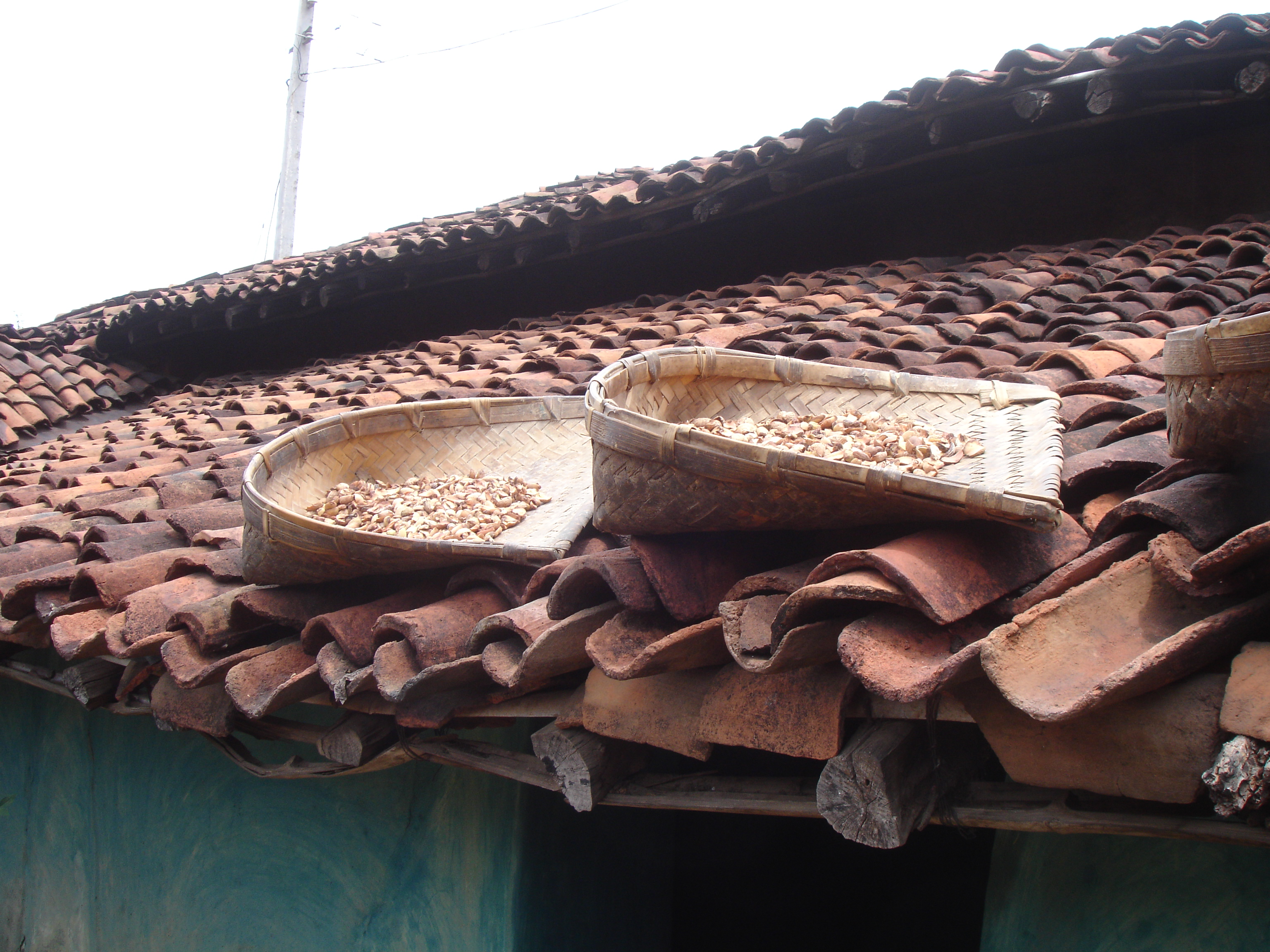
Sun drying of mahura (Madhuca) using Traditional Supa prepared from Bamboo in a Chhattisgarhi Village, India

== Literature ==
Wine prepared from Madhūka flowers (Madhuca longifolia) finds mention in several Hindu, Jain and Buddhist literature works. It also finds mention in Ayurveda Samhitas which lists it among several different kinds of wine.

Kali who is seated on a red lotus in full bloom, her beautiful face radiant, watching Mahākāla, who, drunk with the delicious wine of the madhūka flower, is dancing before her..

— Mahānirvaņa Tantra

== Sacred tree ==
Madhūka or Mahura tree is the sacred tree of various temples in South India, including Irumbai Mahaleswarar Temple, Iluppaipattu Neelakandeswarar Temple, Tirukkodimaada Senkundrur at Tiruchengode, and Thiruvanathapuram. The Tamil saint-philosopher Thiruvalluvar is believed to have been born under an iluppai tree within the Ekambareshwarar Temple at Mylapore, and hence madhūka remains the sanctum tree of the Valluvar shrine built within the Ekambareshwarar temple complex.

== Mahua Oil ==
- Average oil Content: 32.92 to 57.53%
- Refractive index: 1.452
- Fatty acid composition (acid, %) : palmitic (c16:0) : 24.5, stearic (c18:0) : 22.7, oleic (c18:1) : 37.0, linoleic (c18:2) : 14.3
- Elements : Carbon (C), Calcium (Ca), Nitrogen (N), Magnesium (Mg), Phosphorus (P), Sodium (Na)

Trifed, a website of the Ministry of Tribal Affairs, Government of India reports: "mahura oil has emollient properties and is used in skin disease, rheumatism and headache. It is also a laxative and considered useful in habitual constipation, piles and haemorrhoids and as an emetic. Native tribes also used it as an illuminant and hair fixer."

It has also been used as biodiesel.

== Other names ==
- Other botanical names: Bassia longifolia L., B. latifolia Roxb., Madhuca indica J. F. Gmel., M. latifolia (Roxb.) J.F.Macbr., Illipe latifolia (Roxb.) F.Muell., Illipe malabrorum (Engl.) Note: the authentic genus Bassia is in the Chenopodiaceae. The names B. longifolia and B. latifolia are illegitimate.
- Varieties:
  - M. longifolia var. latifolia (Roxb.) A.Chev. (=B. latifolia (Roxb))
  - M. longifolia var. longifolia
- Vernacular names:
  - Santali:matkom
  - Bengali:mohua(মহুয়া)
  - Oriya:"Mahula"(ମହୂଲ)
  - English: honey tree, butter tree
  - French: illipe, arbre à beurre, bassie, madhuca
  - India: moha, mohua, madhuca, kuligam, madurgam, mavagam, nattiluppai, tittinam, mahwa, mahura, mowa, moa, mowrah, mahuda (Gujarati-મહુડા)
  - Marathi: "Mahu" and "muvda" in Pawari local tribal lang (Nandurbar, Maharashtra) / "Moha"
  - Rajasthan: "dolma" in mevadi and marwari
  - Sri Lanka: මී mee in Sinhala
  - Tamil: iluppai (இலுப்பை),
  - Telugu: vippa (విప్ప),
  - Myanmar: မယ်ဇယ်
  - Nepal : Chiuri (चिउरी)
- Synonymous names for this tree in some of the Indian states are mahura and mohwa in Hindi-speaking belt, mahwa, mahula, Mahula in Oriya and maul in Bengal, mahwa and mohwro in Maharashtra, mahuda in Gujarat, ippa puvvu (Telugu: ఇప్ప) in Andhra Pradesh, ippe or hippe in Karnataka (Kannada), illupei or இலுப்பை in Tamil, poonam and ilupa in Kerala (Malayalam) and mahula, moha and modgi in Orissa (Oriya).

== Gallery ==
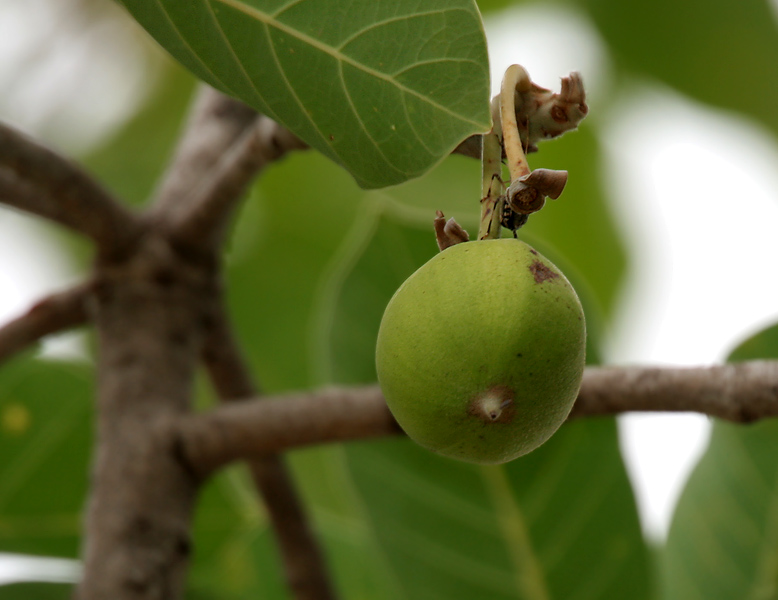
Fruit in Narsapur, Medak district, India

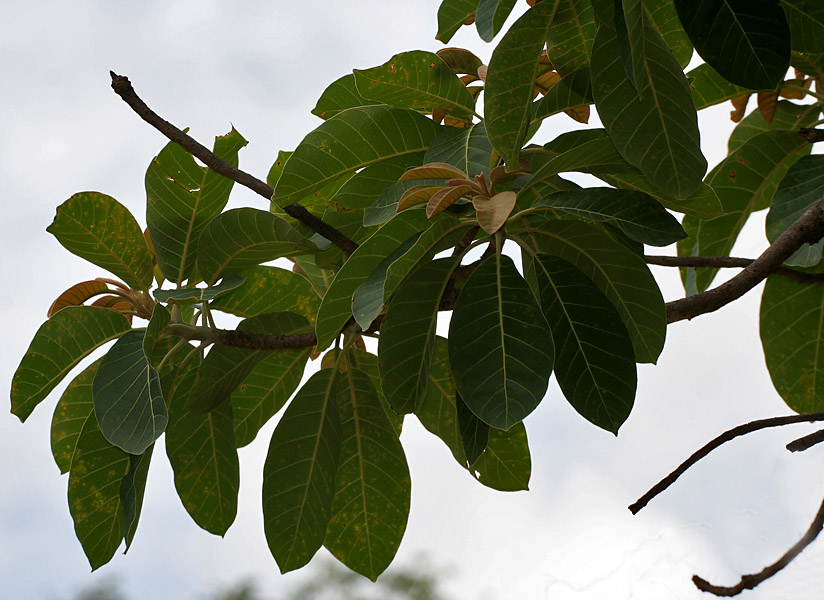
Fruit with leaves in Narsapur, Medak district, India

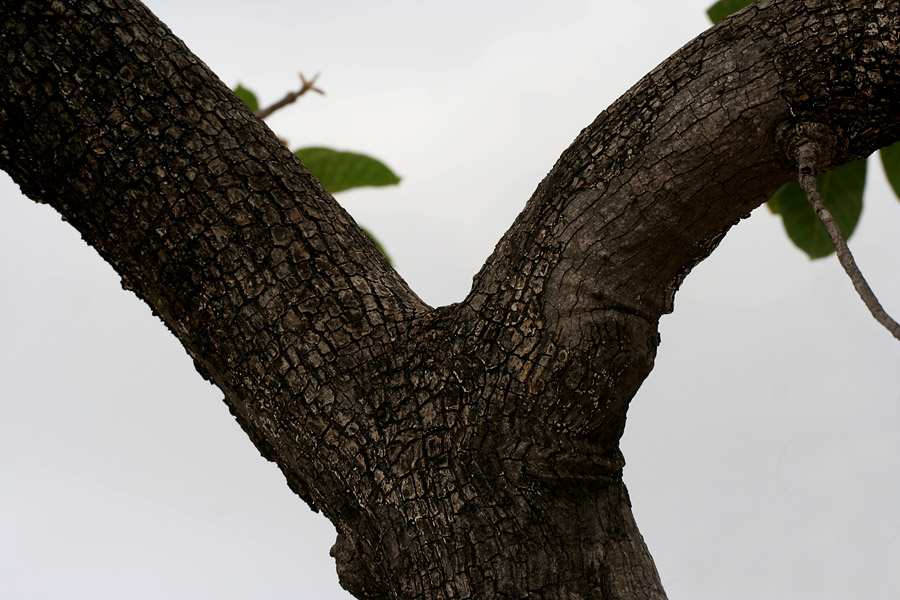
Trunk in Narsapur, Medak district, India

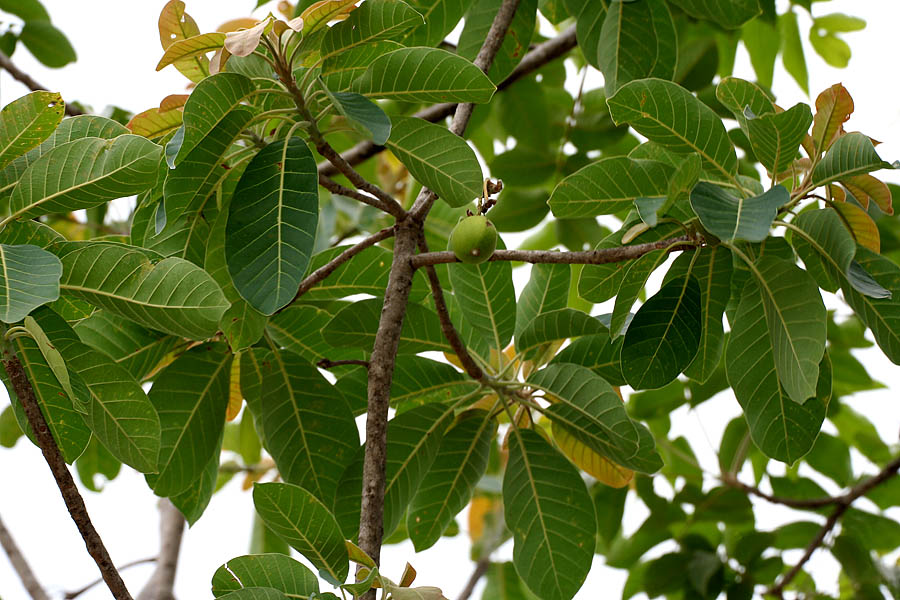
Tree in Narsapur, Medak district, India

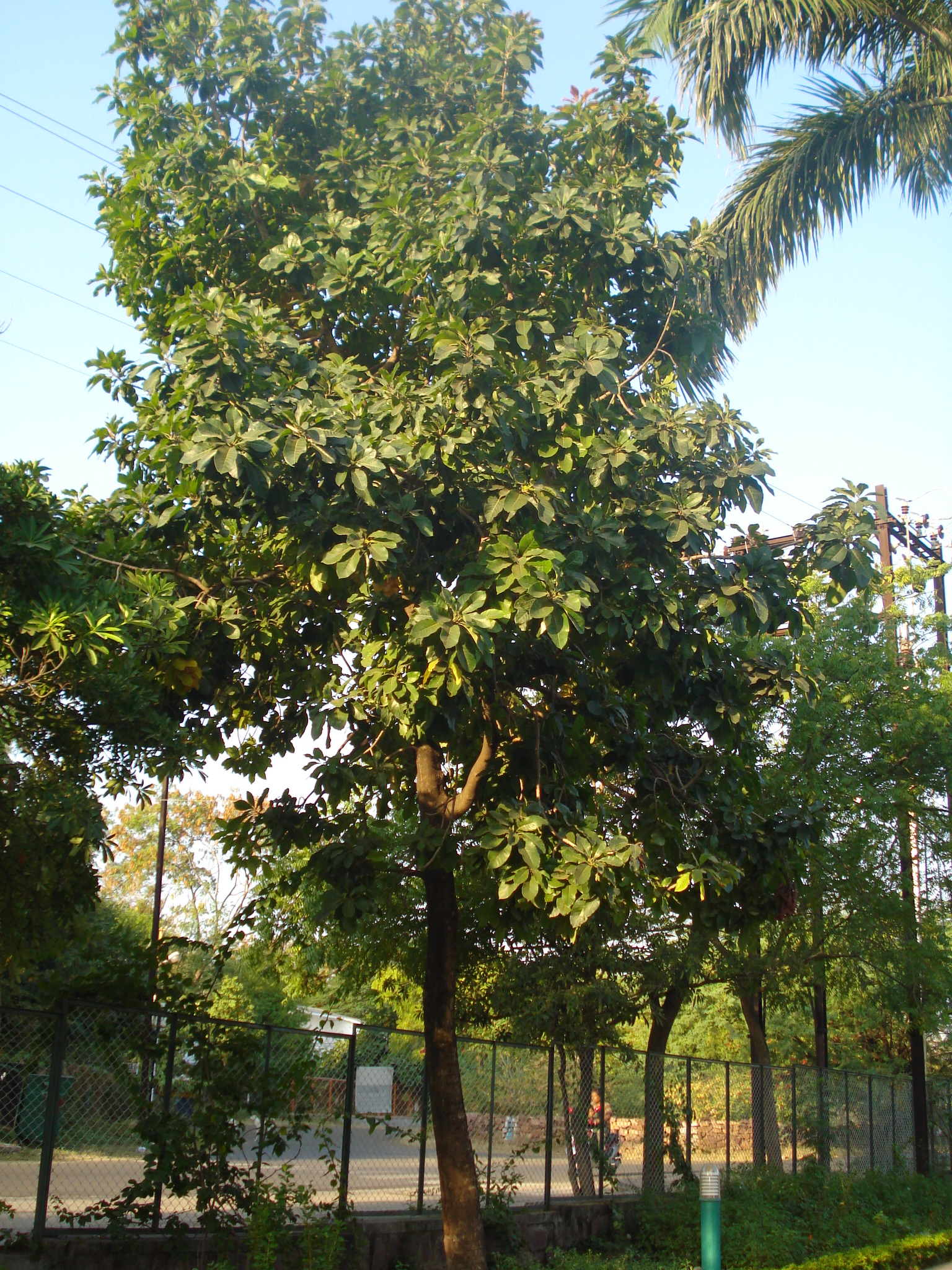

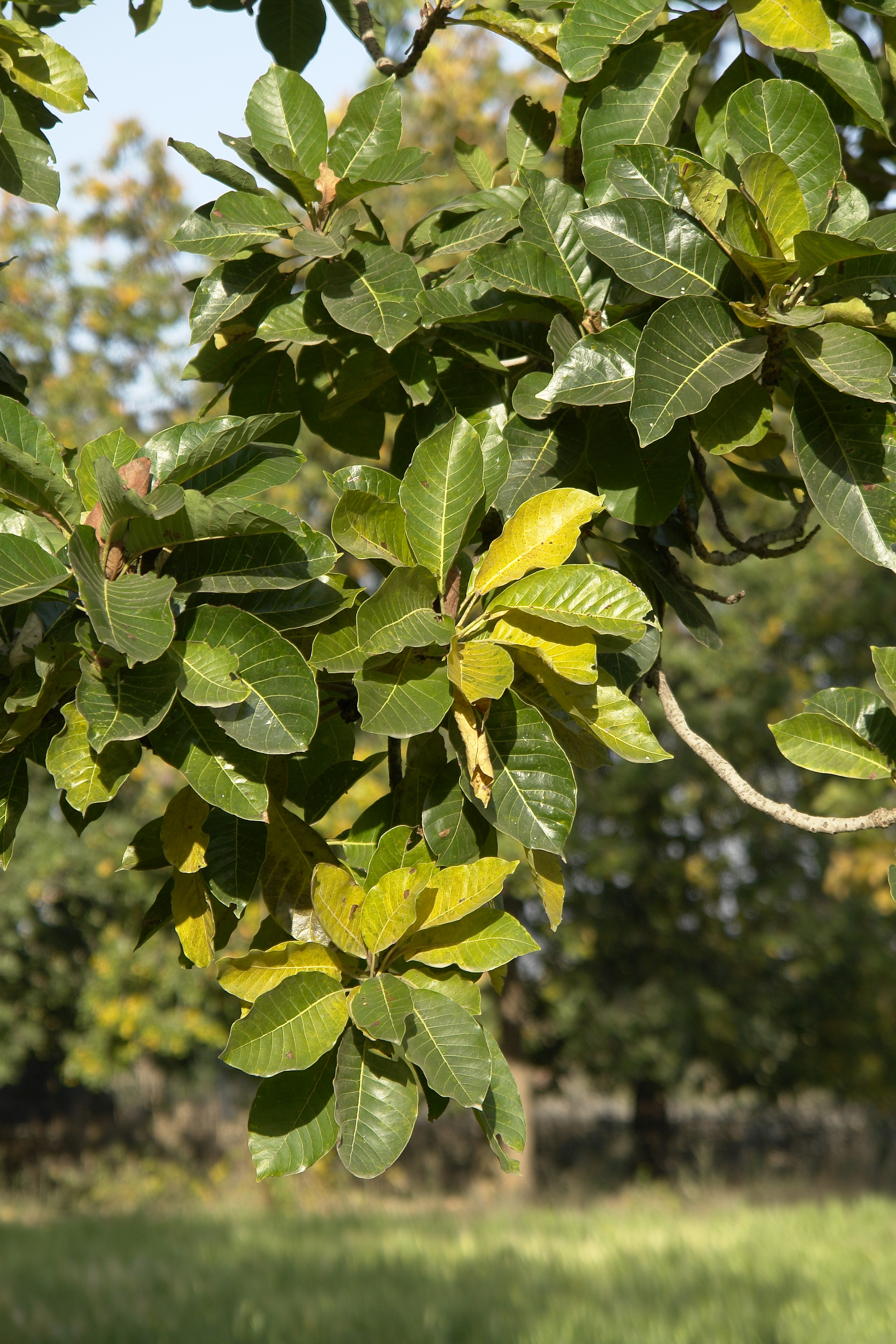
Leaves in Umaria district, Madhya Pradesh

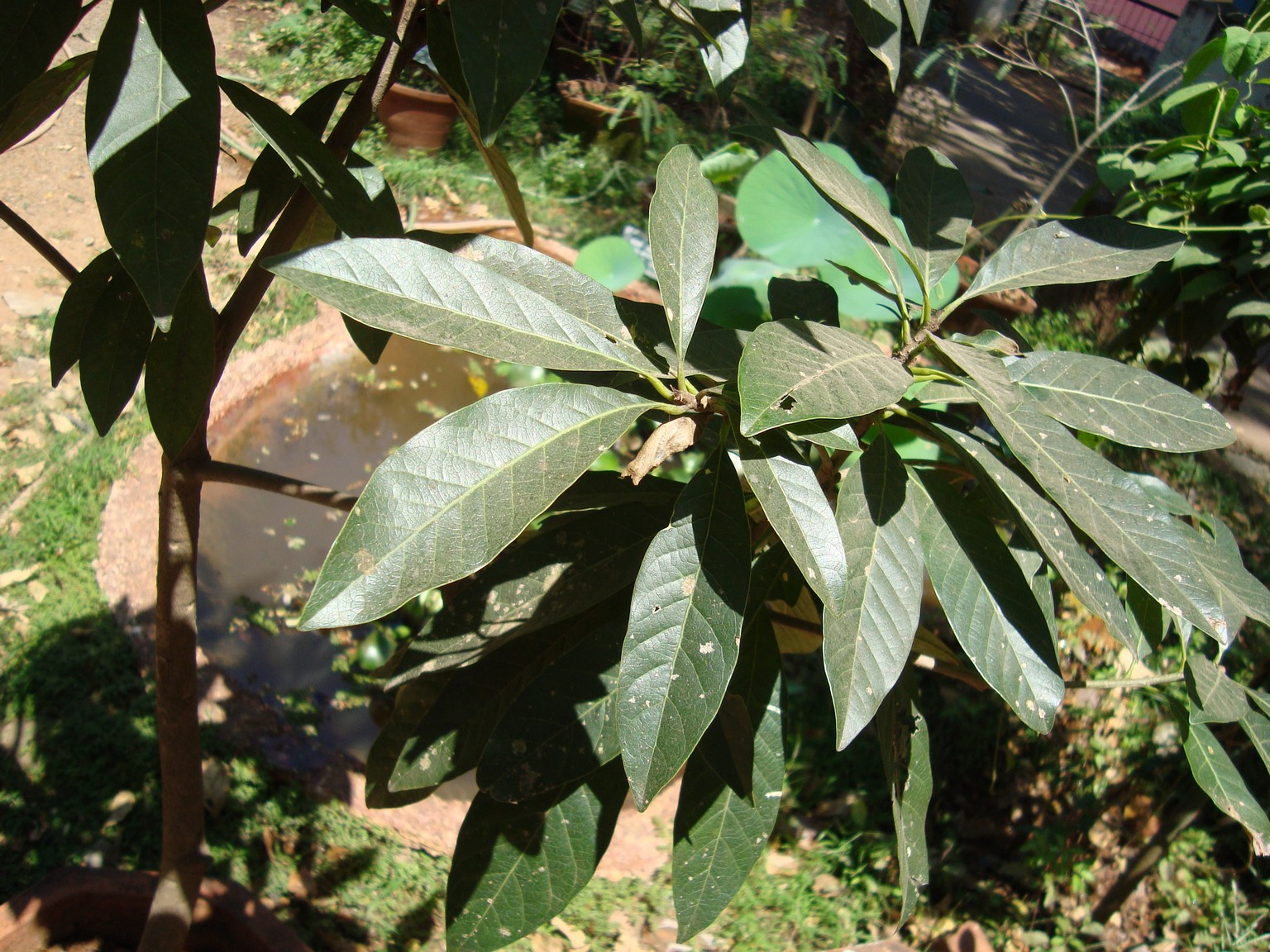
mahura Tree in Thrissur, Kerala, India

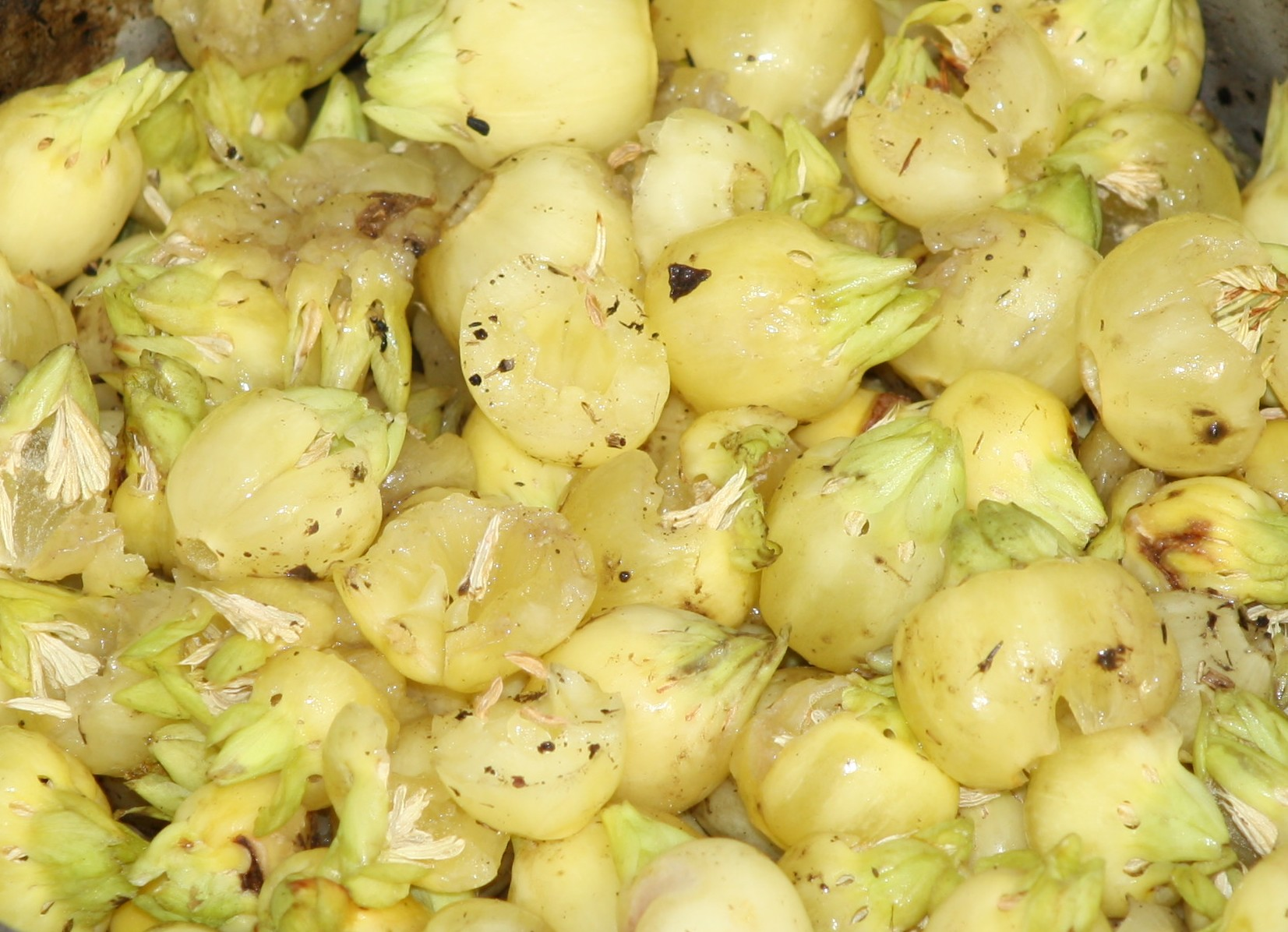
Flowers from Melghat Tiger Reserve, Maharashtra

== Bibliography ==
- Boutelje, J. B. 1980. Encyclopedia of world timbers, names and technical literature.
- Duke, J. A. 1989. Handbook of Nuts. CRC Press.
- Encke, F. et al. 1993. Zander: Handwörterbuch der Pflanzennamen, 14. Auflage.
- Govaerts, R. & D. G. Frodin. 2001. World checklist and bibliography of Sapotaceae.
- Hara, H. et al. 1978–1982. An enumeration of the flowering plants of Nepal.
- Matthew, K. M. 1983. The flora of the Tamil Nadu Carnatic.
- McGuffin, M. et al., eds. 2000. Herbs of commerce, ed. 2.
- Nasir, E. & S. I. Ali, eds. 1970–. Flora of [West] Pakistan.
- Pennington, T. D. 1991. The genera of the Sapotaceae.
- Porcher, M. H. et al. Searchable World Wide Web Multilingual Multiscript Plant Name Database (MMPND) - on-line resource.
- Saldanha, C. J. & D. H. Nicolson. 1976. Flora of Hassan district.
- Saldanha, C. J. 1985–. Flora of Karnataka.
