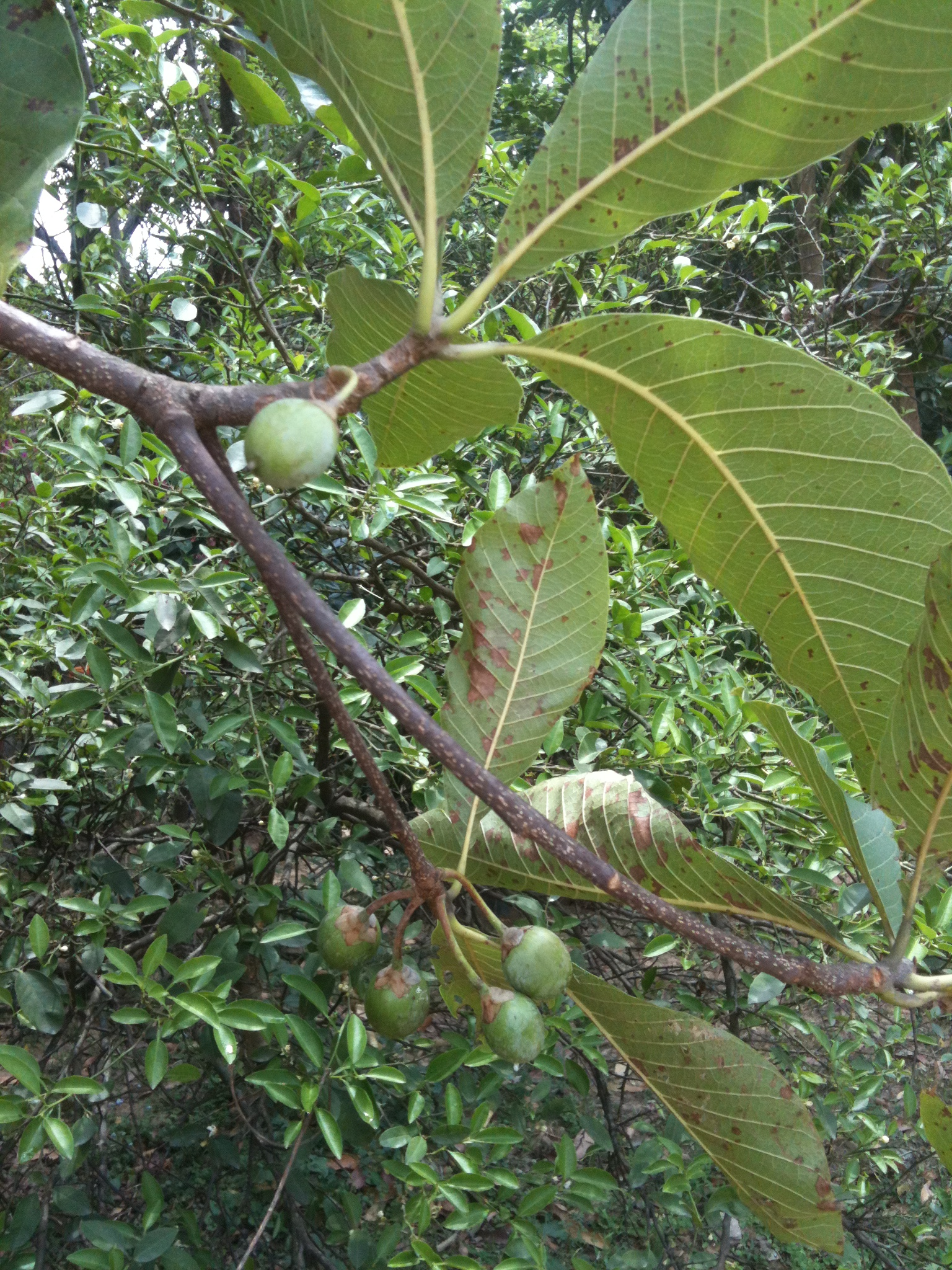
- Chiuri Fruit in Panchkhal, Nepal

Scientific classification
- Kingdom: Plantae
- Clade: Embryophytes
- Clade: Tracheophytes
- Clade: Spermatophytes
- Clade: Angiosperms
- Clade: Eudicots
- Clade: Asterids
- Order: Ericales
- Family: Sapotaceae
- Genus: Diploknema
- Species: D. butyracea

Binomial name
- Diploknema butyracea (Roxb.) H.J.Lam

Synonyms
- Aesandra butyracea (Roxb.) Baehni; Bassia butyracea Roxb.; Madhuca butyracea (Roxb.) J.F.Macbr.

= Diploknema butyracea =

Species of tree

Diploknema butyracea (Nepali: चिउरी, Chiuri), the Nepali butter tree, or the Indian butter tree, is a multi purpose tree native to the foothills of the Himalayas. An estimated number of chiuri in Nepal has been given as approximately 10.8 million trees, geographically distributed in 46 districts. It is a large tree of family Sapotaceae, flowers during cold season and fruit ripens in June–July. It commonly occurs in the sub Himalayan tract between 300-1500m from sea level.

== Uses ==
Fat is extracted from the seeds and named chiuri ghee or phulwara butter. D. butyracea is useful for block planting and also to be grown in the ravines of hills. The latex yielding plant such as D. butyracea suits to different edapho-climatic conditions and thus does not compete with the traditional crops. The chiuri tree has been utilised for many uses by rural households in Nepal. Ghee is used in daily cooking, as fuel for lamps, and body lotion; the fruit is eaten fresh and use for alcohol distillation, oil-cakes are utilised as manure, and the tree itself is used as firewood. Additionally, it also has significant cultural and livelihood associations with the Chepang community (Nepali:चेपांग) of Nepal and are given as dowry to daughters. Because of its cultural significance, it has been recognised as a cultural keystone species of central Nepal's Chepang people.

== Commercialization ==
Despite its importance, the tree is underutilized, not farmed commercially and remains a gathered product by various peoples in the country. However, the annual policy and programme of Bagmati Provincial Government for the fiscal year 2023/24 features a chiuri conservation programme with local Chepang communities. For this purpose, the provincial government has allocated the equivalent of US$38,000 in Chitwan, Dhading and Makwanpur districts.

== Gallery ==
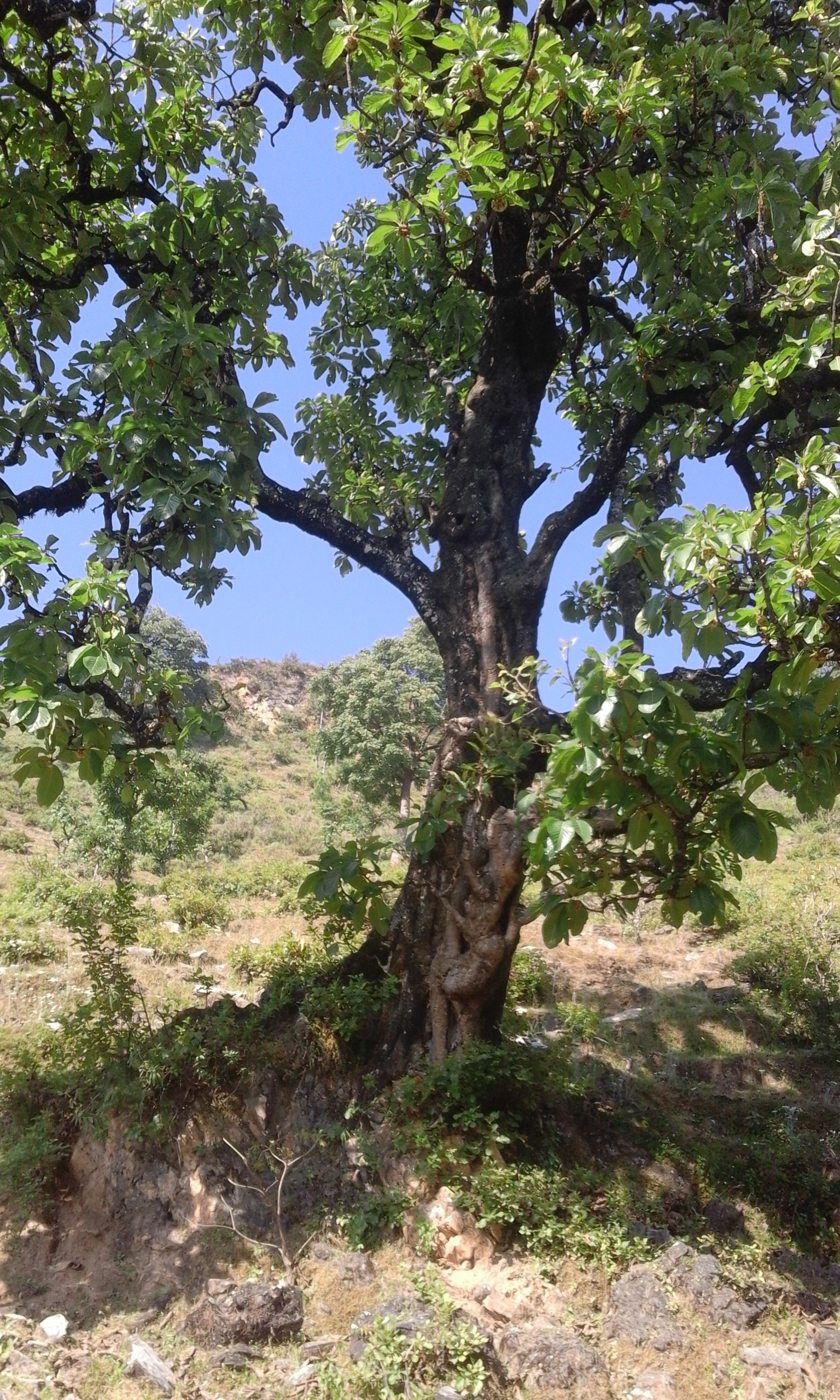
Diploknema butyracea Tree

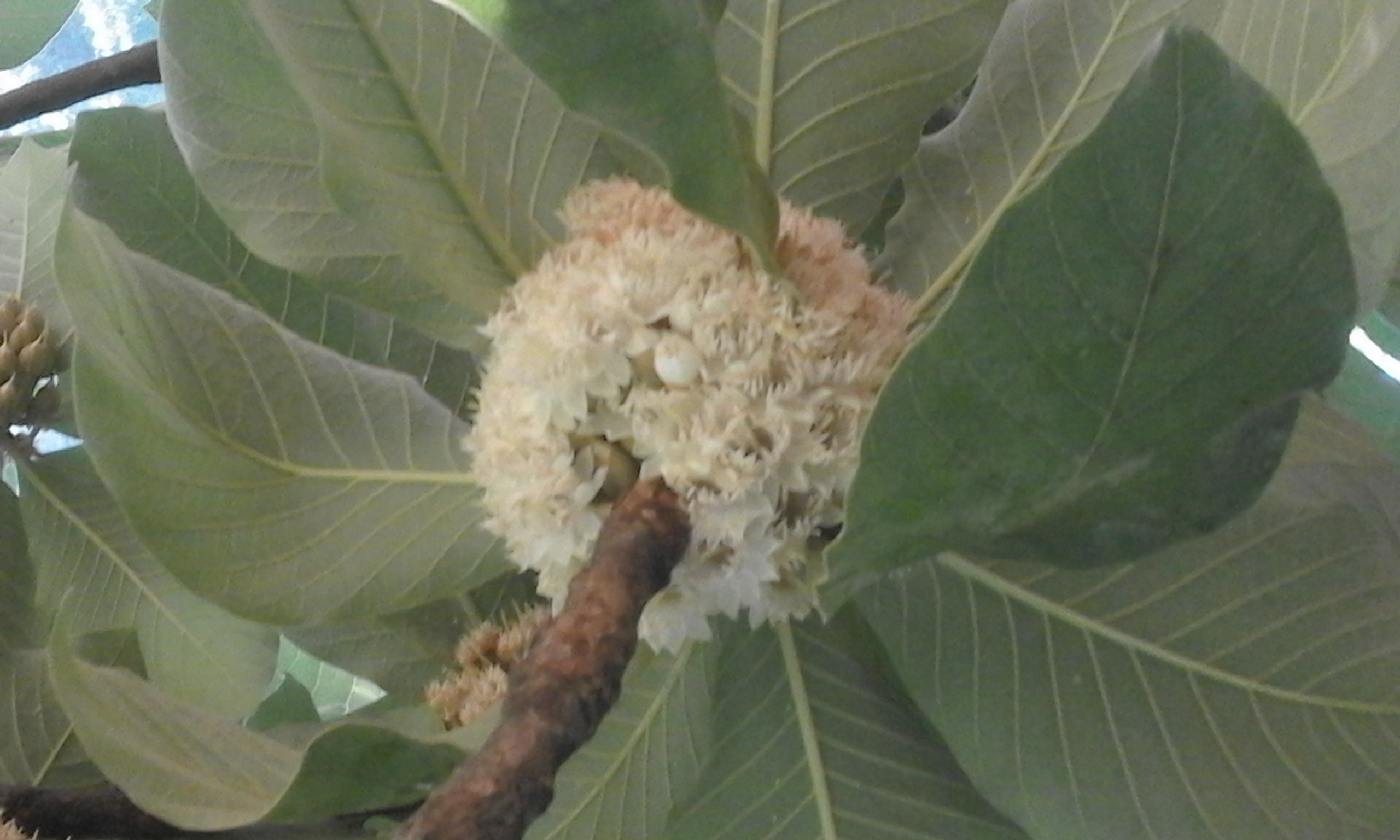
Flowers on a chiuri tree

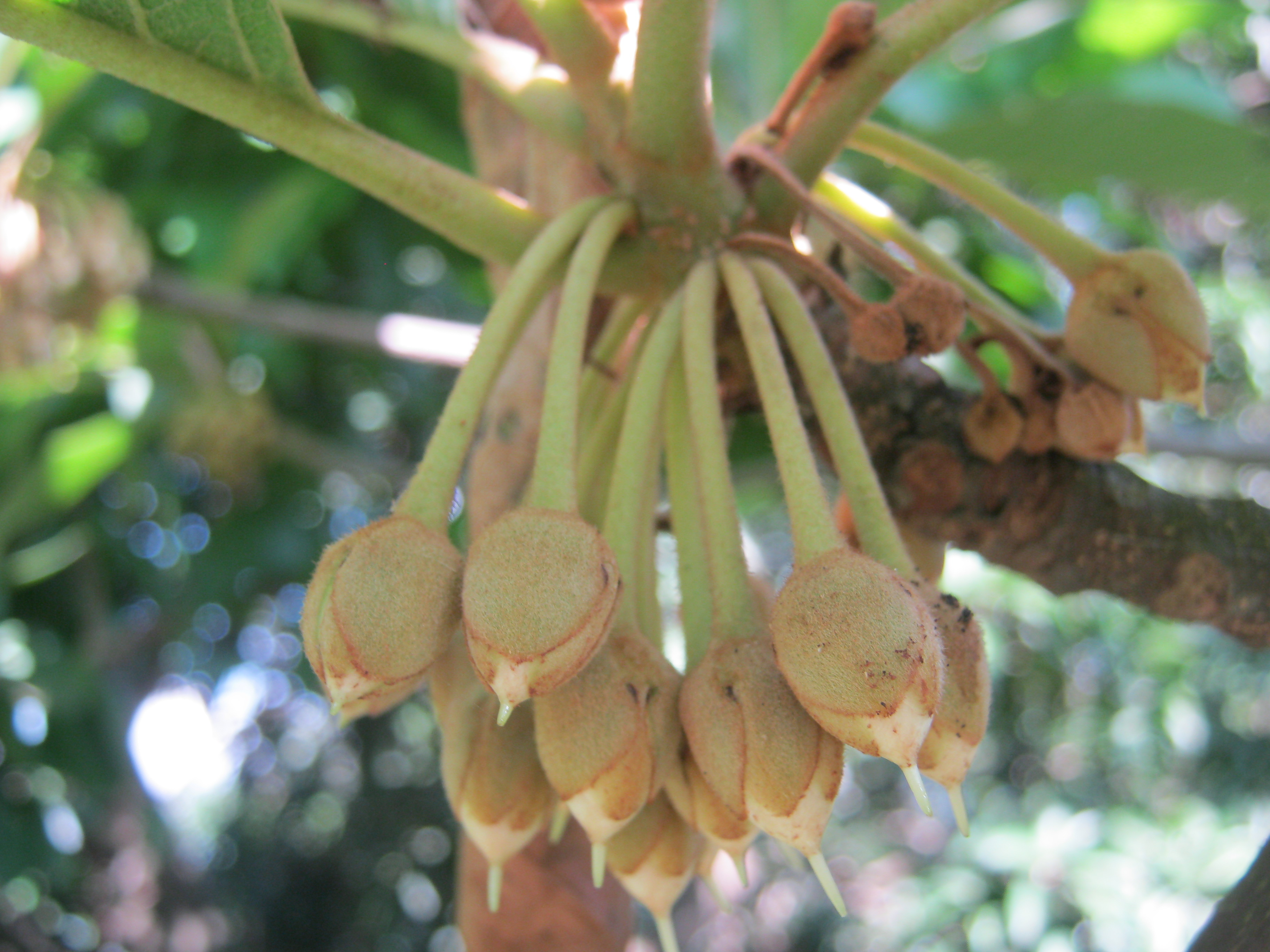
Chiuri flower bud

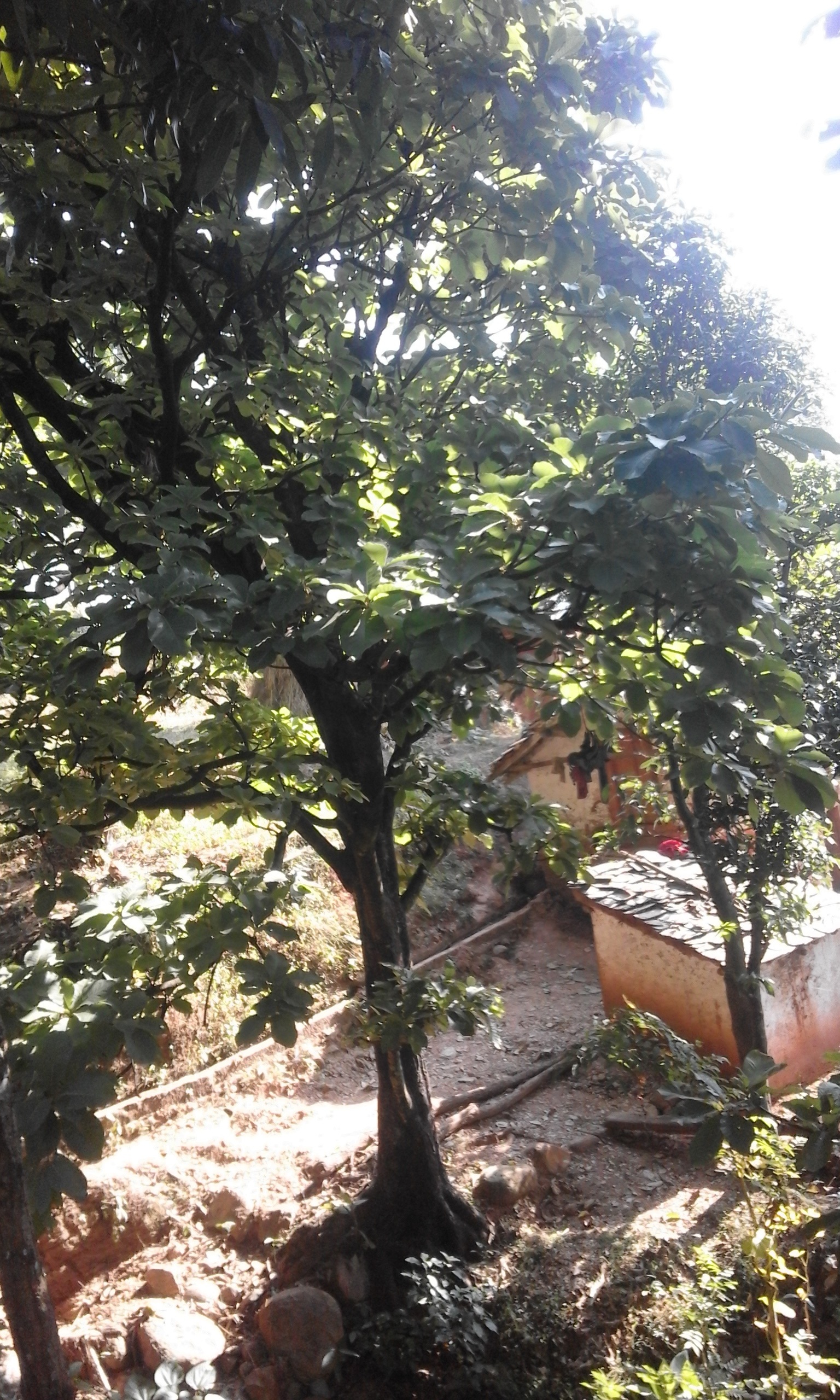
Diploknema butyracea Tree

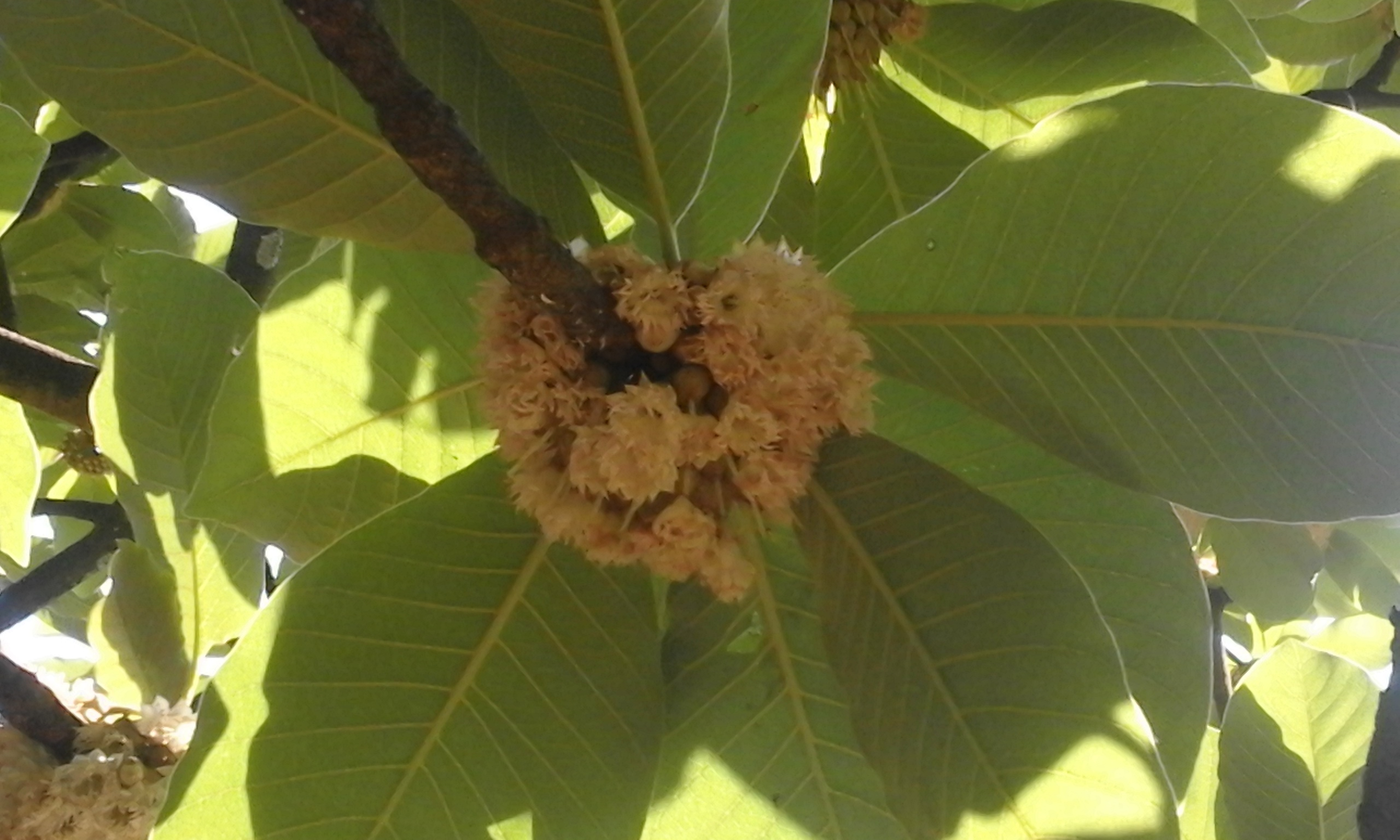
Chiuri flower

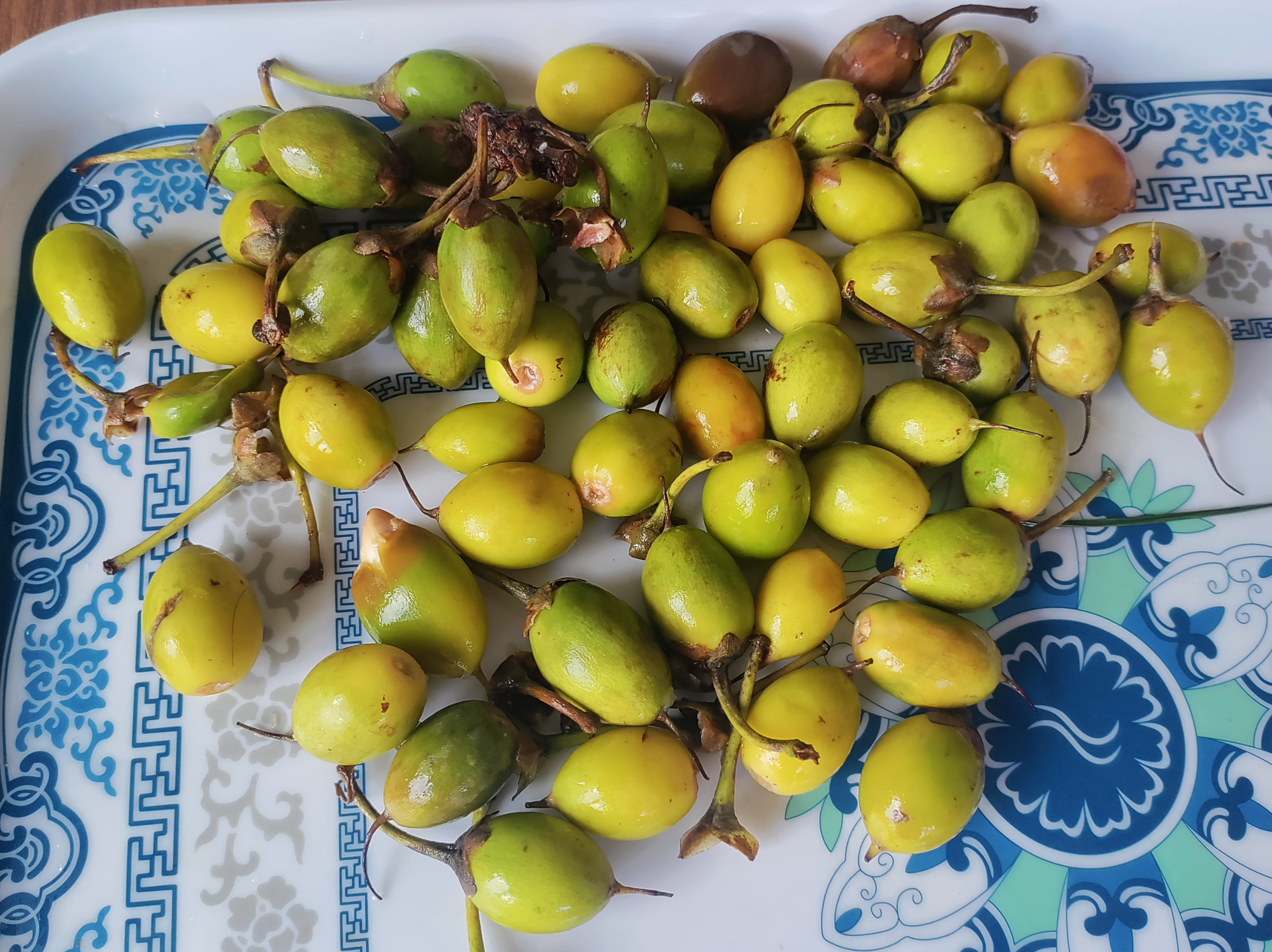
Ripe Diploknema butyracea

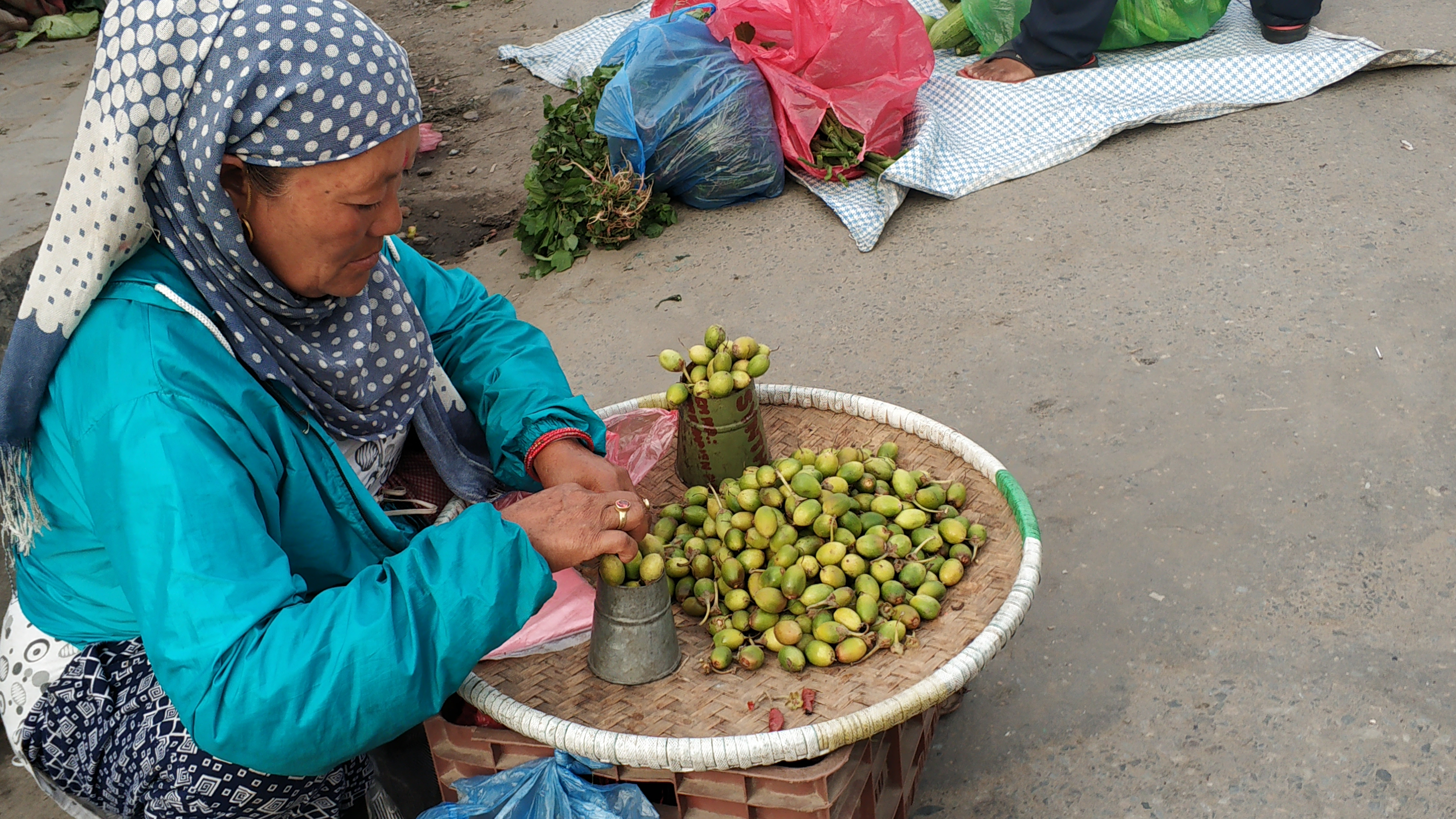
An elderly woman selling Chiuri fruit in Lalitpur, Nepal

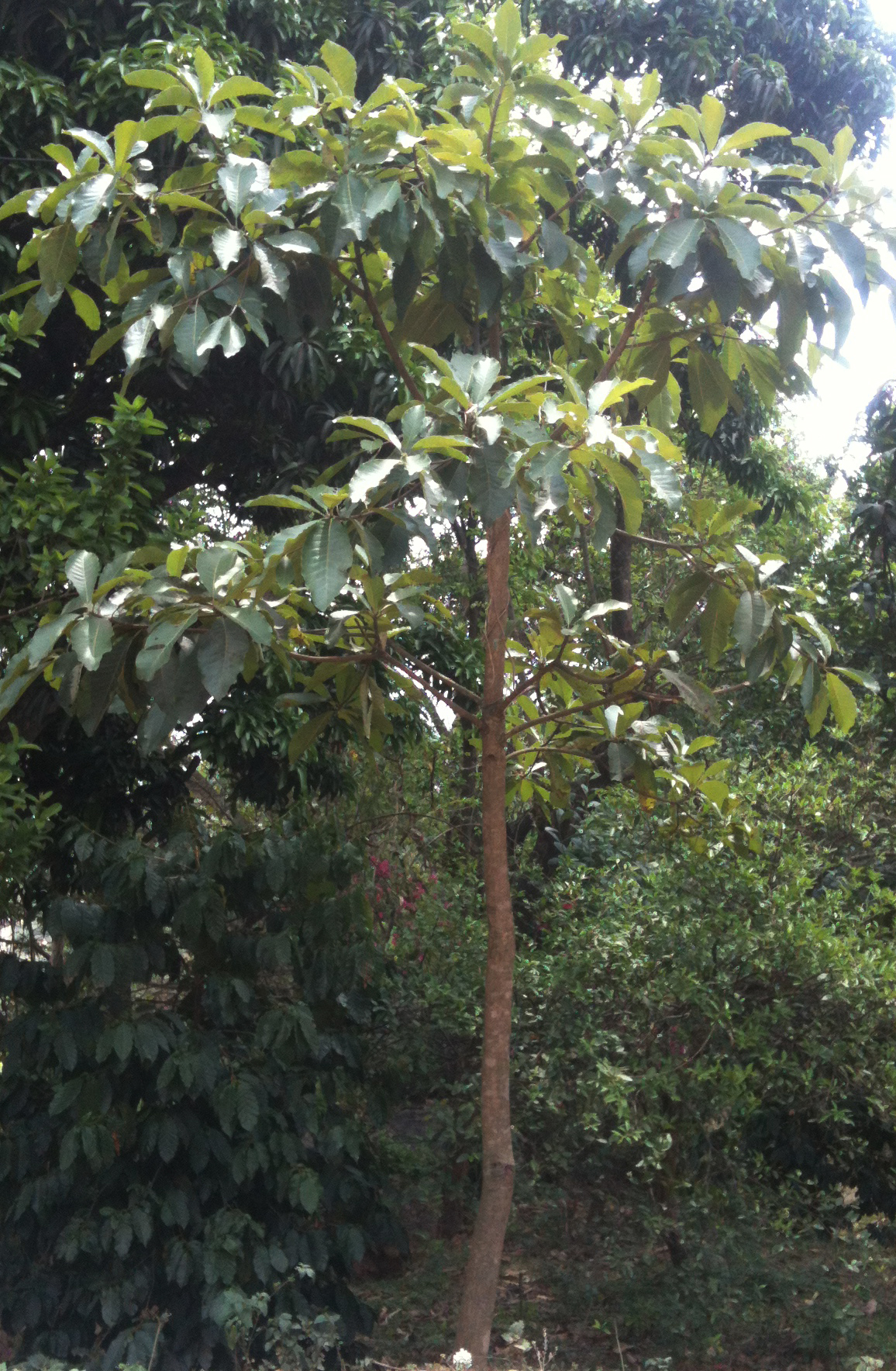
Diploknema butyracea(Chiuri) plant
