= Sang Hyang Adi Buddha =

Religious concept in Indonesian Buddhism

Sanghyang Adi Buddha is a concept of God in Indonesian Buddhism. This term was used by Ashin Jinarakkhita at the time of Buddhist revival in Indonesia in the mid-20th century to reconcile the first principle of the official philosophical foundation of Indonesia (Pancasila), or Ketuhanan Yang Maha Esa (lit. 'Recognition of the Divine Omnipotence') that requires the belief in a supreme god which Buddhism, strictly speaking, does not have. This concept is used by the Indonesian Buddhist Council, an organization that seeks to represent all Buddhist traditions in Indonesia such as Theravada, Mahayana, and Vajrayana.

Adi-Buddha is a term used in Tantric Buddhism to refer to the Primordial Buddha. The term Sanghyang Adi Buddha is agreed upon and used by the Indonesian Supreme Sangha and the Indonesian Buddhist Council as the designation for "God Almighty". This term is not found in Pāli Canon, but used in some old Indonesian Vajrayana texts such as Sanghyang Kamahayanikan.

== Conception ==
Sang Hyang Adi Buddha refers to "the seed of Buddhahood" inside every being. In Mahayana Buddhism, Adi Buddha refers to the primordial Buddha that outlines the same Universal Dhamma. The Adi-buddha is not a monotheistic deity as in the Abrahamic traditions, but is rather the primordial nature of mind, the part of the mind that never enters samsara, and is thus the "primordial Buddha." As the Primordial Buddha never entertains conceptual ignorance or proliferation, all that arises is referred to as "self-liberated." Sogyal Rinpoche writes:"[Kuntuzangpo] represents the absolute, naked, sky-like primordial purity of the nature of our mind.""

For the purposes of official recognition as a religion by the state, Mahabhiksu Ashin Jinarakkhita encouraged Indonesian Buddhists to present the Adi-Buddha as: "a concept of 'supreme divinity' in the Dharma that would be most readily recognizable and acceptable to predominantly Muslim authorities."

Adi-Buddha is the Primordial Buddha, or Paramadi Buddha (The first and incomparable Buddha). He has some other names in other Buddhist traditions such as Adau‐Buddha (Primordial Buddha), Anadi‐Buddha (Uncreated Buddha), Uru‐Buddha (Buddha of the Buddhas). He also called Adinatha (The first Protector), Svayambhulokanatha (self-originating World Protector), Vajradhara (Vajra Holder), Vajrasattva (Vajra Being), Svayambhu (the Self-Originating One), or Sanghyang Adwaya (Unequalled). In Chinese language, Adi‐Buddha is Pen‐chu‐fu (Chinese: 本初佛; pinyin: Běnchūfó), while aramadi‐Buddha is translated as Sheng‐chu‐fu. In Tibet Dan‐pohi‐sans‐rgyas, Mchog‐gi‐dan‐pohi‐sans‐rgyas, or Thogmahi‐sans‐rgyas are all refers to "Buddha of the Buddhas", that existed since the beginning, as the first: Paramadi‐buddhoddhrta‐sri‐kalacakra‐nama‐tantraraja and Jnanasattva‐manjusryadi‐buddha‐nama‐sadhana.

Mahayana Buddhism believes that Buddha has three bodies (Trikaya), i.e.: "The Created Body" (Nirmanakaya) to teach common human being; "Body of Mutual Enjoyment" (Sambhogakāya) or the body of bliss or clear light; and "Truth Body" (Dharmakāya) which is eternal, omnipresent, non-individual, almighty, non-dual, and self-originating (svabhava‐kaya). There may be many Buddhas, but only one Dharmakaya. This Dharmakaya is identical with Adi‐Buddha. The sources of this Trikaya doctrine are Avatamsaka Sutra and Mahayana‐sraddhotpada‐shastra. The last one was the work of Asvagosha, a monk who lived around the first century AD. Vetulyaka Lokottaravada School says that Sakyamuni originally was the manifestation of Adi‐Buddha in this world. Herman S. Hendro (1968) wrote:

"Dalam Kitab Sutji Sang Hyang Kamahayanikan, pupuh ke-19 didjelaskan bahwa Sang Buddha Gautama telah menunggal dengan Sang Hyang Adhi Buddha atau dengan kata lain bahwa Sang Buddha Gautama adalah pengedjawantahan dari Sang Adhi Buddha. Karena itu bila kita menjebut Sang Adhi Buddha maka itu adalah Sang Buddha jang tidak berkarya (saguna)."
"In the Sacred Book of Sanghyang Kamahayanikan, 19th stanza, is explained that the Buddha Gautama was merged with Sang Hyang Adhi Buddha, or in other words the Buddha Gautama was the manifestation of the Adhi Buddha. Therefore if we refers the Adhi Buddha then He is the Buddha who is inactive (saguna)."

With his power, he emanates into five Dhyani Buddhas. The Pure Land of the Adi Buddha is called Ogamin in Tibetan or Akanistha in Sanskrit (lit. "not down" or "without (back) to the bottom").

=== Buddhist concept ===
In Udana Nikaya (viii: 3), Sakyamuni gave his teaching:

There is, O monks, an Unborn, Unoriginated, Uncreated, Unformed. Were there not, O monks, this Unborn, Unoriginated, Uncreated, Unformed, there would be no escape from the world of the born, originated, created, formed. Since, O monks, there is an Unborn, Unoriginated, Uncreated, Unformed, therefore is there an escape from the born, originated, created, formed. What is dependent, that also moves; what is independent does not move. Where there is no movement, there is rest; where rest is, there is no desire; where there is no desire, there is neither coming nor going, no ceasing-to-be, no further coming to be. Where there is no ceasing-to-be, no further coming-to-be, there is neither this shore [this world] nor the other shore [Nirvana], nor anything between them.

From the Pali language: Athi Ajatam Adbhutam Akatam Samkhatamor "the Unborn, Unoriginated, Uncreated, and Absolute One". The Primordial Buddha is something without ego (anatta), unpersonified, and indescribable in any form. But for there is the Absolute, the unconditioned (Asamkhatam), one can attain the freedom from the wheel of life (samsara) by meditating.

Sanghyang Adi Buddha is the origin of everything in the universe, but he himself is without beginning or end, self-originating, infinite, omnipotent, unconditioned, absolute, omnipresent, almighty, incomparable, and immortal. However, those words are unable to describe the true self of Sanghyang Adi Buddha. The existence of Adi Buddha demonstrates that this life is not the product of chaos, but the product of spiritual hierarchy. By the presence of Adi Buddha, this life becomes useful and be possible to attain enlightenment and Buddhahood.

The Indonesian Supreme Sangha describes God in Buddhism and (for the purposes of state recognition as a religion) defines God as "the source of everything that exists": Almighty, eternal, everything in the universe are His exposition, intangible and does not manifest Himself.

=== Indonesian National Encyclopedia ===
Indonesian National Encyclopedia (1988) describes Adi Buddha and the traditions that are used this term thus:

Adi-Buddha is a term for the Almighty God in Buddhism. This title came from the Aisvarika tradition of Mahayana in Nepal, which is spread through Bengal, and became also known in Java. Aisvarika is the term for the disciples of theist view in Buddhism. This word came from 'Isvara' which means 'God' or 'Great Buddha' or 'the Almighty', and 'ika' which means 'follower' or 'disciple'. This term is used by the Svabhavavak Buddhism in Nepal. This school is one of the branch of Tantrayana school of Mahayana. The term for God Almighty in this school is Adi-Buddha. Later, this view also spread to Java in the time of Srivijaya and Majapahit. The present scholars knows this term from the paper of B.H. Hodgson, a researcher who studied the religious in Nepal. According to this view, one can coalesce (moksha) with Adi-Buddha or Isvara through his efforts with the ascetic path (tapa) and meditating (Dhyana).

=== The Seeker's Glossary of Buddhism ===
The Seeker's Glossary of Buddhism gives the following definition for Adi Buddha:

Term used in Mahayana Buddhism, especially in Nepal and Tibet, for the 'primordial Buddha', the Buddha without beginning." (Ling: 8)

The primordial Buddha. Although the concept itself can be traced to early Buddhism, it is widely acknowledge that the notion of the Adi-Buddha was fully developed in esoteric Buddhism. In [traditional Mahayana] Buddhism, the Adi-Buddha is represented by Mahavairocana Buddha". (Preb: 38)

== Indonesia ==
Since the time of Sailendra and Mataram kingdom, Indonesian Buddhists have had a belief in the existence of the Adi-Buddha similar to the Buddhists in Tibet, Nepal, and the northern schools. Nepalese Buddhism uses the term Adinata, which means "main protector", and Swayambhulokanatta, which means "the unborn protector of the universe". The Tibetan form of the term is Vajradhara (Tibetan Dorjechang; lit. "ruler of all the mysteries"). The Namasangiti text composed by Candrakīrti (a monk who lived in Indonesia), and the symbolism of Borobudur's mandala stupa, provided evidence that the Buddhism embraced by Indonesian people since the days of Srivijaya, Ancient Mataram, Sailendra, and Majapahit is a Buddhism that honors the Primordial Buddha.

Some Indonesian sacred texts that contain the name of Sanghyang Adi Buddha are:

Guna Karanda Vyuha text

In the time of nothingness, Shambu was already exist, this is what is called Svayambhu (self-manifested), and preceded all things, this is why he is called the Adi Buddha.

Sanghyang Kamahayanikan text

All praises for Sanghyang Adi Buddha, this is the Sanghyang Kamahayanikan that I have been wanted to teach you, to the sons of Buddha (whom also) the family of Tathagata, the grandeur of 'Sanghyang Mahayana' practices is what i have to teach you.

Herman S. Hendro (1968), in his paper, mentioned:

The closed uppermost large stupa [of Borobudur] is the epitome of a man who has reached the Absolute Freedom (Nibbana/ Nirvana) and united with Adi Buddha. Inside that stupa once was an incomplete and rough Buddha statue which is depicting the Adi Buddha which is unimaginable by human.

=== Modern Indonesia ===
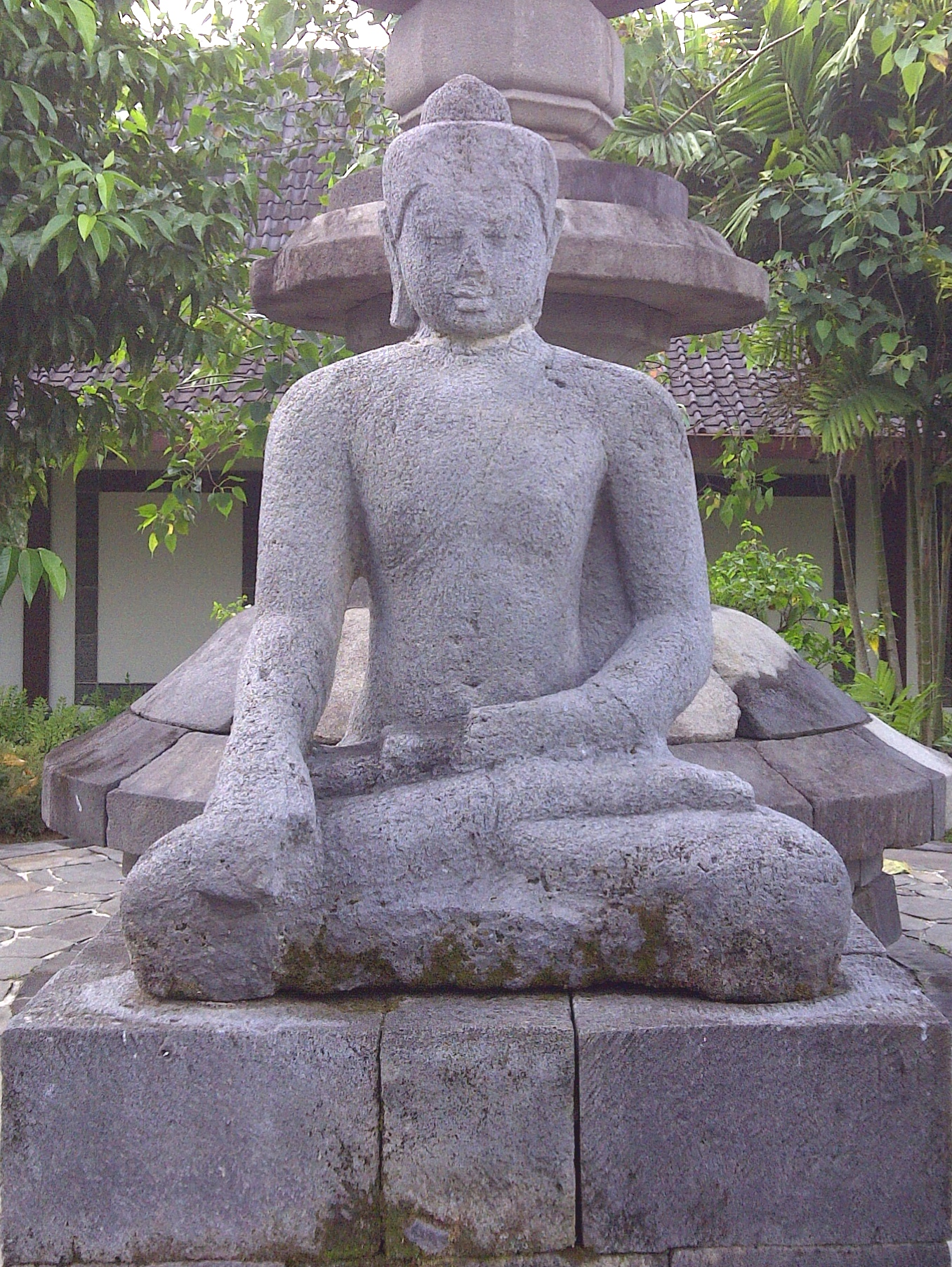
The unfinished buddha statue of the main stupa of Borobudur Temple at Karmawibhangga Museum

At the time Indonesian independence in 1945, the leaders of the nascent state agreed on a proposed ideology that would serve all ethnicities, religions, and races, (i.e., Pancasila) as the basic foundation of the state and nationhood. The first precept of Pancasila is "Belief in the Almighty Godliness" ("Recognition of the Divine Omnipotence"). (Note: The Indonesian word "Tuhan" usually is translated into "God" or "Lord". "Tuhan" is a noun while "Ketuhanan" is an adjective. Wilis in her paper cited: With the addition of prefix and suffix, it changes the noun into an adjective “Ketuhanan” or “Lordness.” Page 3, 4.) The majority of Indonesian people mistranslated the Sanskrit "Esa" ("Almighty") as "Eka" ("One"). This misconception has brought doubt upon the Indonesian conception of Buddhism as a monotheist religion.

Following an alleged coup attempt by the Communist Party of Indonesia (PKI) in 1965, Indonesian Government rejects and prohibits the development of all views that correspond to communism or atheism. Consequently, there was some doubt within the Indonesian Government at the time whether Buddhism can be accepted as an official religion. Ashin Jinarakkhita proposed the name of Sanghyang Adi Buddha as the god of Buddhist teachings. He sought confirmation for this uniquely Indonesian version of Buddhism in ancient Javanese texts, and even the shape of the Buddhist temple complex at Borobudur in Central Java. It was submitted to the Minister of Religious Affairs, and the government eventually accepted Buddhism as a state religion in 1978, as stated in GBHN (Outlines of Indonesian State Policy) of 1978, Presidential Decree No. 30 of 1978, and the Form Letter of Indonesian Department of the Interior No.477/74054/1978 (November 18, 1978).

== Controversy ==
The use of Sanghyang Adi Buddha as a name for a supreme God is controversial among Indonesian Buddhists to the present day. The reason is that the concept of Sanghyang Adi Buddha, which only exists in Tantrayana/ Vajrayana traditions, is not a god in the sense of a personal god of the monotheistic religions. The use of the name of Sanghyang Adi Buddha as a personal god, is the product of a compromise with political reality, and is contrary to the teachings of Buddhism. Because of this political compromise, Indonesian Buddhism differs from mainstream Buddhism. This controversy also extends to Very Venerable Ashin Jinarakkhita as the originator of the term Sanghyang Adi Buddha as a god in Buddhism.

While the State seemed to be easily satisfied with Ashin Jinarakkhita's assurance, questions came from their fellow Buddhists and, later, also his primary disciples who were on the same boat with him in the beginning. Since then, debates, disintegration, and splits could not be avoided within Buddhist organizations. The strongest opposition was coming from the Theravādin members, and it seemed to happen partly because of the influence of the Thai Buddhist’s purification movement started in the nineteenth century by King Mongkut as later on many Thai Bhikkhus coming to Indonesia. Though there were also Buddhist monks coming from Sri Lanka and Myanmar, such as Narada Mahathera, Mahasi Sayadaw and other Sangha members, they only came a few times during these early years.

In the same year when the controversy was erupting (1974), the Indonesian Directorate General Guidance of Hindu-Buddhism (Gde Puja, MA.) issued a resolution on all schools/ traditions of Buddhism that they should believe in the presence of an Almighty God (First precept of Pancasila), and while each of this sects may give different names to Him, He is essentially the same entity. This resolution became indirectly a government imposition of the doctrine of Oneness of God on all schools/traditions of Buddhism. Any schools/ traditions that do not believe in the existence of One God would be dissolved. This happened to the Mahayana school/ tradition of the monk Sun Karma Chandra which was dissolved on July 21, 1978.

Nowadays, the term of Sanghyang Adi Buddha only used mostly by Indonesian Buddhayana Council and Indonesian Supreme Sangha. Some schools treat the concept indifferently, while the others simply refuse and consider the idea as heresy (especially the Indonesian Theravada Sangha), and only a fraction supports it fully or partially.

== Usage ==
=== Religious usage ===
==== Salutation ====
Sanghyang Adi Buddha is used in greeting especially by Indonesian Buddhayana Council, i.e. Namo Sanghyang Adi Buddhaya. This salutation was popularized by the late Venerable Mahawiku Dharma-aji Uggadhammo, one of the five first disciples of Ashin Jinarakkhita, whose ordained as the first Indonesian Buddhist monks after the independence of Indonesia.

The complete salutation which is commonly used as a greeting in the books' preface, letters, or meeting is:

Namo Sanghyang Adi Buddhaya.
Namo Buddhaya, Bodhisatvaya Mahasatvaya. (Note: See the preface on Buddhist ritual books Li Fo Chan Hui Wen PA SHE PA FO by Sagin, Saddharma Pundarika Sutra Avalokitesvara Bodhisattva Samanta Mukha Varga (2005) by the Indonesian Supreme Sangha, and Amitabha Sutra, Evening Service complete edition + translation.) (Note: The salutation on the PREFACE of Paguyuban Wulan Bahagia and East Java Indonesian Buddhist Council's magazine is Namo SangHyang Adi Buddhaya, Namo Buddhaya.)

==== Vandana ====
The tribute to Sanghyang Adi Buddha is often included in the vandana (devotion) section of ritual books.
1. Vandana

Terpujilah Sanghyang Adi Buddha Tuhan Yang Maha Esa

("Homage to Sanghyang Adi Buddha the Almighty God")

Terpujilah Bhagavā, Yang Maha Suci, Yang telah mencapai Penerangan Sempurna

("Homage to the Blessed One the Worthy One, the Fully Enlightened One")

Terpujilah Para Bodhisattva-Mahasattva

("Homage to all Holy Beings and Great Beings")

2.Vandana

Namo Sanghyang Ādi Buddhaya (3x)

"Homage to the Almighty God, shout the whole world"

Namo Tasya Bhagavato Arahato Samyak-sambuddhasya (3x)

"Homage to the Blessed One the Worthy One, the Fully Enlightened One"

Namo Sarve Bodhisattvāya-Mahāsattvāya (3x)

"Homage to all Holy Beings and Great Beings"

=== Politics ===
Indonesian Government Regulation Number 21/1975 concerning the oath of a civil servant has the text for a Buddhist bureaucrat include "Demi Sanghyang Adi Buddha" ("by Sanghyang Adi Buddha") in the beginning.

== Gallery ==
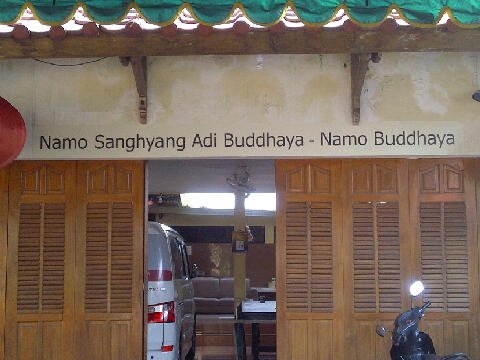
"Namo Sanghyang Adi Buddhaya" is used as a welcome greeting on Vihara Buddhayana Dharmawira Centre, Surabaya, Indonesia.

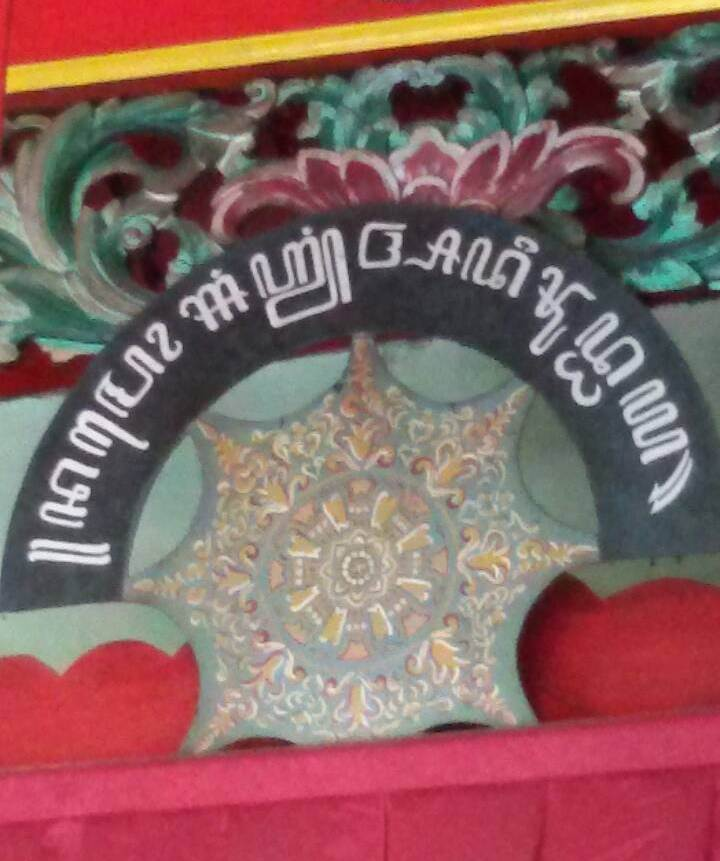
Namo Adi Buddhaya written in Javanese script at Tjen Ling Kiong Temple, Yogyakarta

== See also ==
- Acintya
- Kulayarāja Tantra
- Creator in Buddhism
- Indonesian Esoteric Buddhism
- Unfinished Buddha

== Bibliography ==
- Brown, Iem (1987). "Contemporary Indonesian Buddhism and Monotheism". Journal of Southeast Asian Studies. 18 (1): 108–117. doi:10.1017/S0022463400001284. JSTOR 20070945.
