= Mendut =

9th-century Buddhist site in Indonesia

- ꦩꦼꦤ꧀ꦢꦸꦠ꧀ (Javanese)
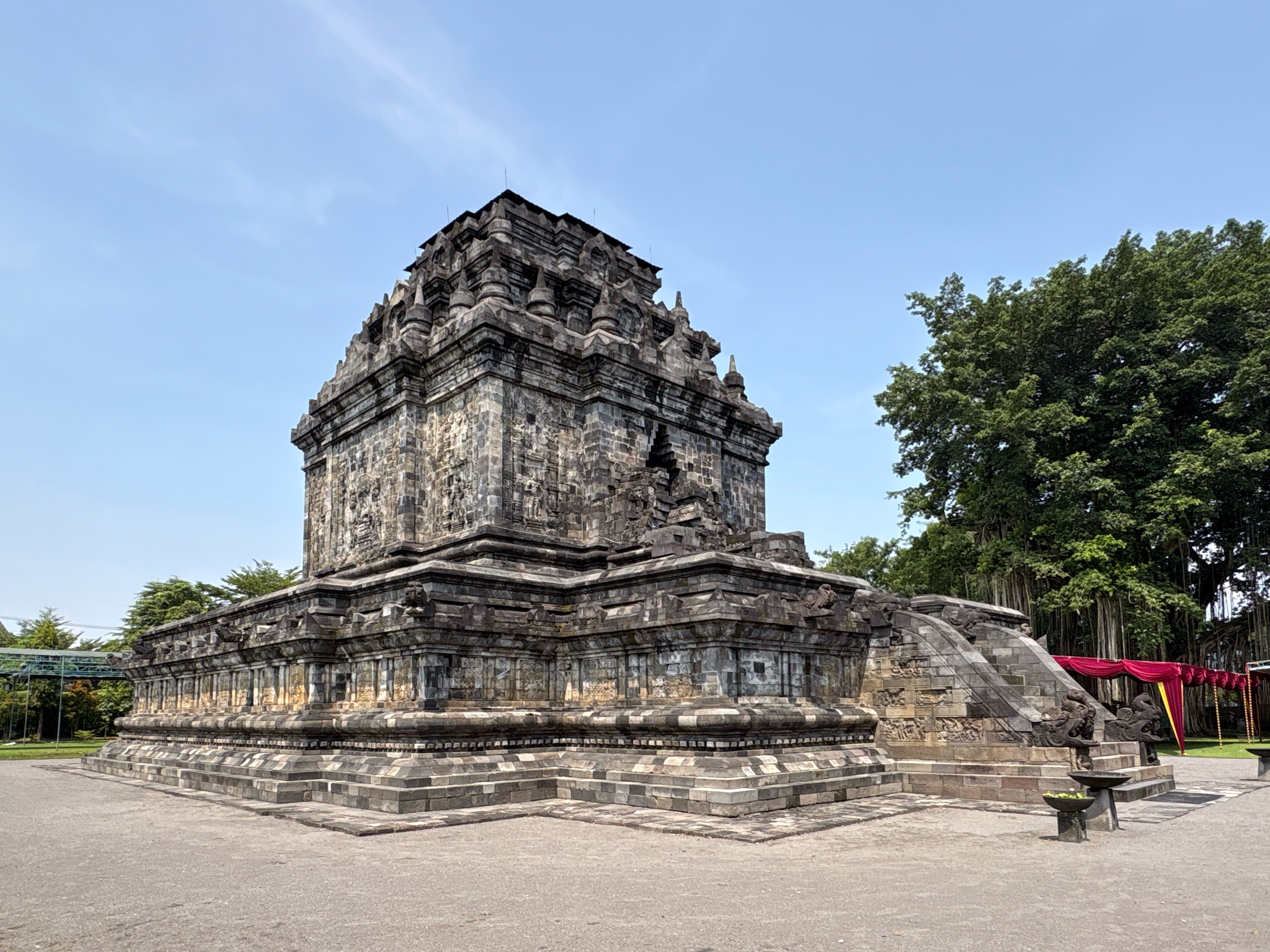
- Northern view of Candi Mendut

- Location within Java Mendut (Indonesia)
- 7.6055°S 110.229°E
- Location: Magelang, Central Java

History
- Built: Originally built in the 9th century during the reign of the Sailendra Dynasty

Site notes
- Architect: Gunadharma
- Restored: 1925
- Restored by: Theodoor van Erp

UNESCO World Heritage Site
- Type: Cultural
- Criteria: i, ii, vi
- Designated: 1991 (15th session)
- Part of: Borobudur Temple Compounds
- Reference no.: 592
- Region: Southeast Asia

Mendut is a ninth-century Buddhist temple, located in Mendut village, Mungkid sub-district, Magelang Regency, Central Java, Indonesia. It is located about 3 kilometres (1.9 mi) east of another temple, Borobudur, and along with Pawon forms a straight line of three temples. There is a mutual religious relationship between the three temples, although the exact ritual process is unknown.

== History ==
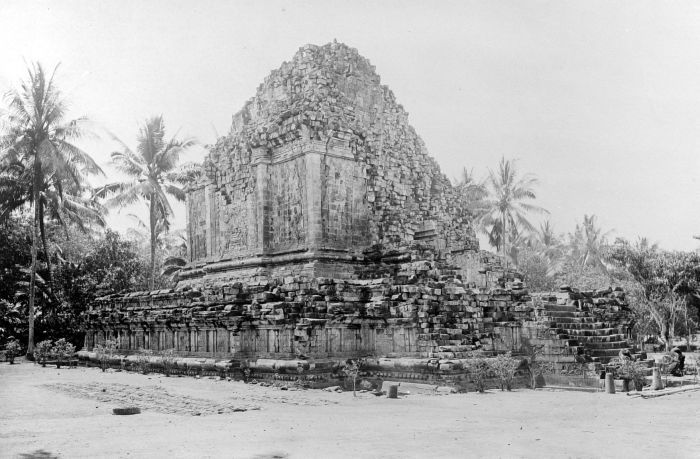
The ruins of Mendut temple before restoration, 1880.

Built around the early ninth century AD, Mendut is the oldest of the three temples including Pawon and Borobudur. According to the Karangtengah inscription, the temple was built and finished during the reign of King Indra of the Shailendra dynasty. The inscription, dated 824 AD, mention that he constructed a sacred building named Venuvana, which means "bamboo forest". The Dutch archaeologist JG de Casparis has connected this description with Mendut.

In 1836 it was discovered as a ruins covered with bushes. The temple's restoration began in 1897 and was finished in 1925. The archaeologists who researched the temple included JG de Casparis, Theodoor van Erp, and Arisatya Yogaswara.

== Architecture ==
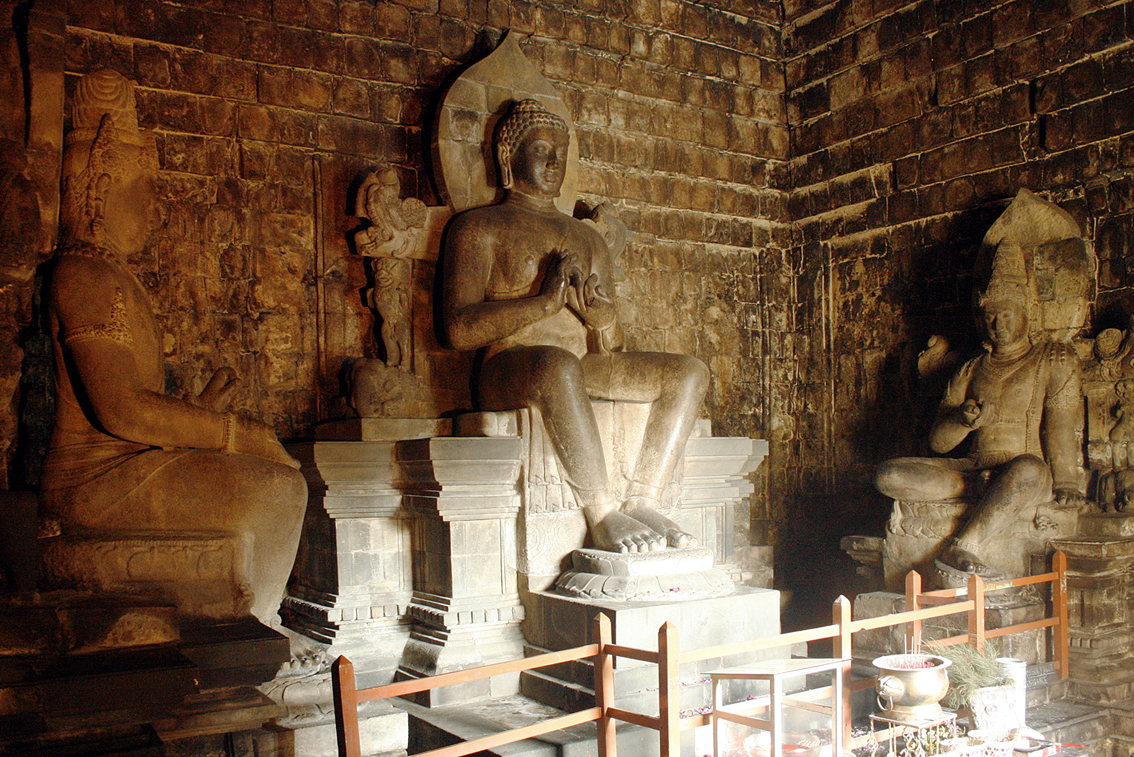
The statue of Dhyani Buddha Vairocana, Avalokitesvara, and Vajrapani inside the Mendut temple

The plan of the temple's base is square, and measures 13.7 metres (45 ft) on each side, with the base level 3.7 metres (12 ft) above the ground. The 26.4 metres (87 ft) tall temple faces northwest. The stairs projecting from the northwest side square elevated base are adorned with a Makara statue on each side. The side of the stairwell is carved with a bas-relief of a Jataka fable narrating the animal story of Buddhist teaching. The square terrace surrounding the body of the temple was meant for pradakshina, a circumambulation ritual that involves walking clockwise around the temple. The outer walls are adorned with bas-reliefs of Boddhisattvas (Buddhist divinities), including Avalokiteśvara, Maitreya, Cunda, Kṣitigarbha, Samantabhadra, Mahakarunika Avalokitesvara, Vajrapani, Manjushri, Ākāśagarbha, and Boddhisattvadevi Prajnaparamita.

Originally the temple had two chambers: a small chamber in the front, and a large main chamber in the center. The roof and some parts of the front chamber walls are missing. The uppermost part of the roof is missing; it is supposed to have a stupa pinnacle of a size and style probably similar to the one in Sojiwan temple. The inner wall of the front chamber is adorned with a bas-relief of Hariti surrounded by children, Atavaka on the other side, Kalpataru, and groups of devata divinities flying in heaven.

Location three Buddhist temples, Borobudur-Pawon-Mendut, in one straight line across Progo River.

The main room has three carved large stone statues. The 3 metres (9.8 ft) tall statue of Dhyani Buddha Vairocana was meant to liberate the devotees from bodily karma. At the left is a statue of Boddhisatva Avalokiteśvara to liberate them from the karma of speech, and at the right is Boddhisatva Vajrapani to liberate from the karma of thought.

== Rituals ==
During the full moon in May or June, Buddhists in Indonesia observe the annual Vesak ritual by walking from Mendut through Pawon to Borobudur. The ritual takes the form of a mass Buddhist prayer and pradakshina (circumambulation) around the temple.

Both Buddhists and followers of traditional Kejawèn (Javanese mysticism) worshipped in the temple, which is believed to be able to fulfil wishes, such as deliverance from sickness. Childless couples, for example, pray at the bas-relief of Hariti for a child, since in traditional Javanese beliefs, Hariti is a symbol of fertility, patroness of motherhood, and protector of children.

== Gallery ==
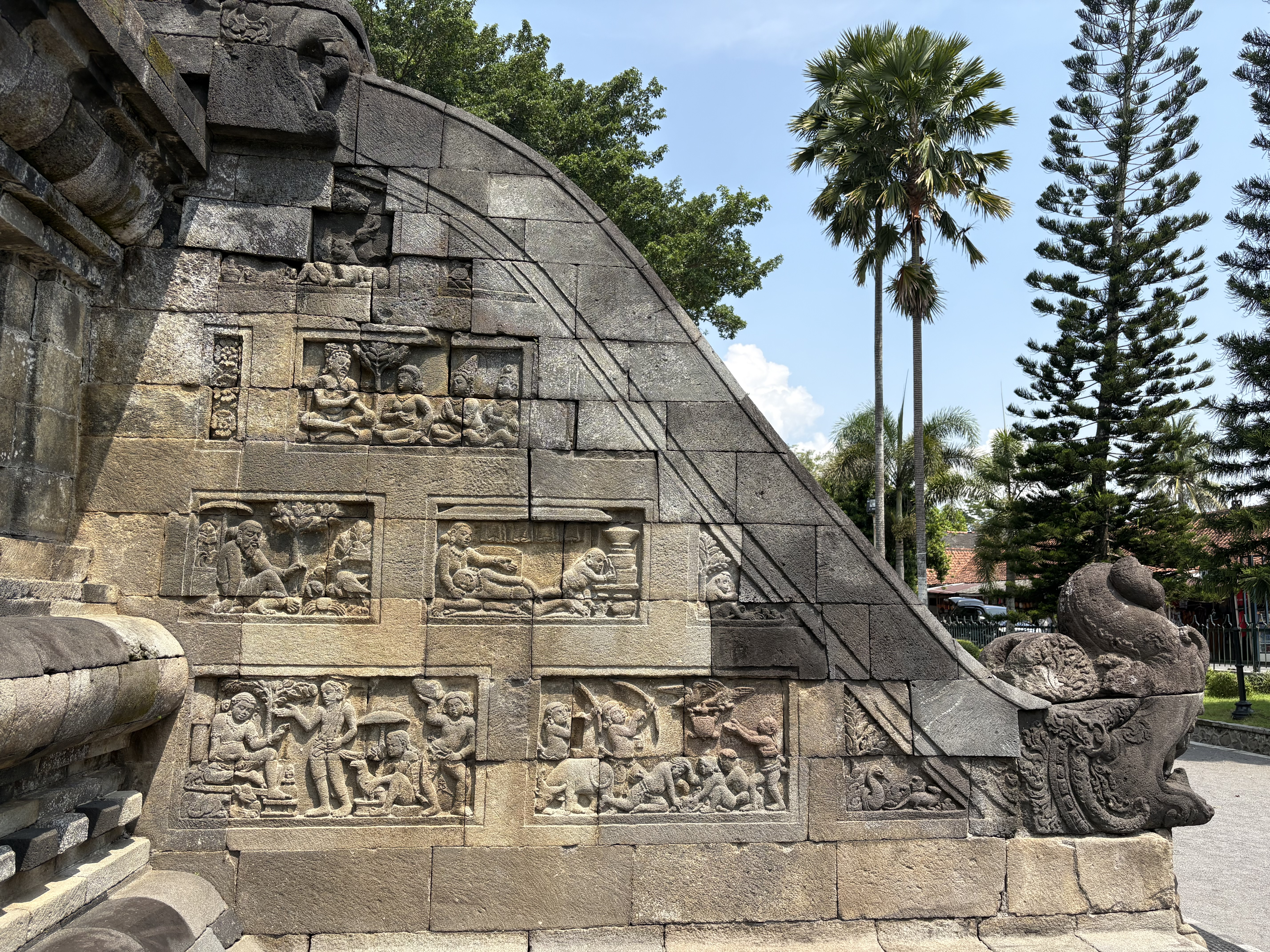
Carvings on a side of the stairwell

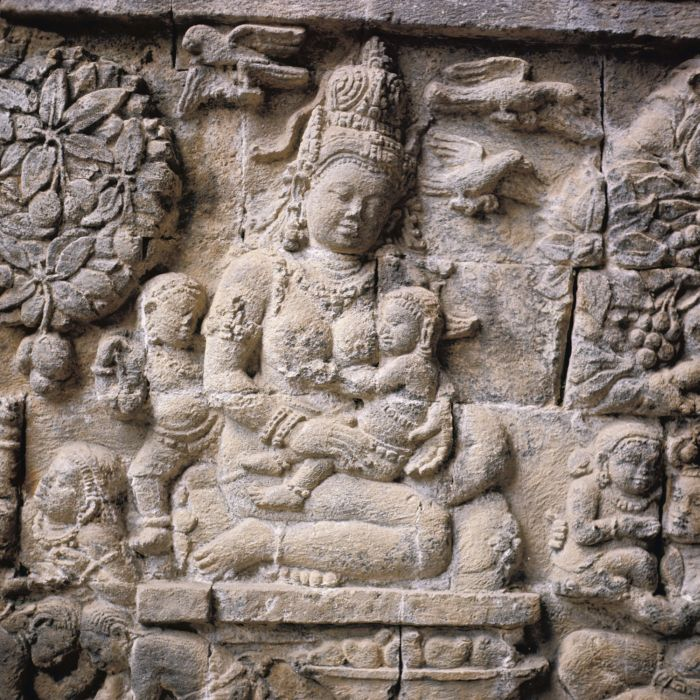
The bas-relief of Hariti on the inner northern wall of Mendut

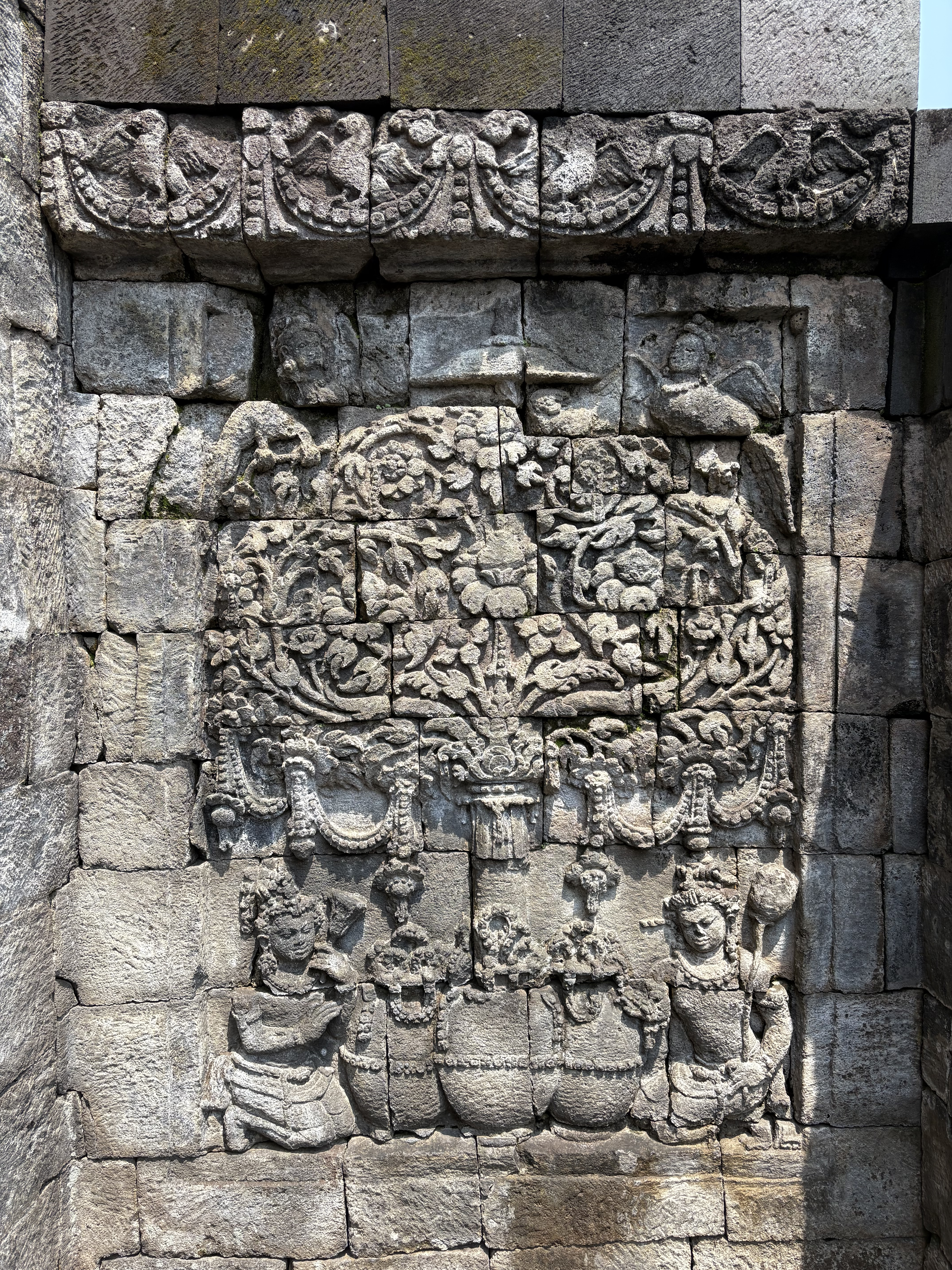
Bas-relief of Kalpataru

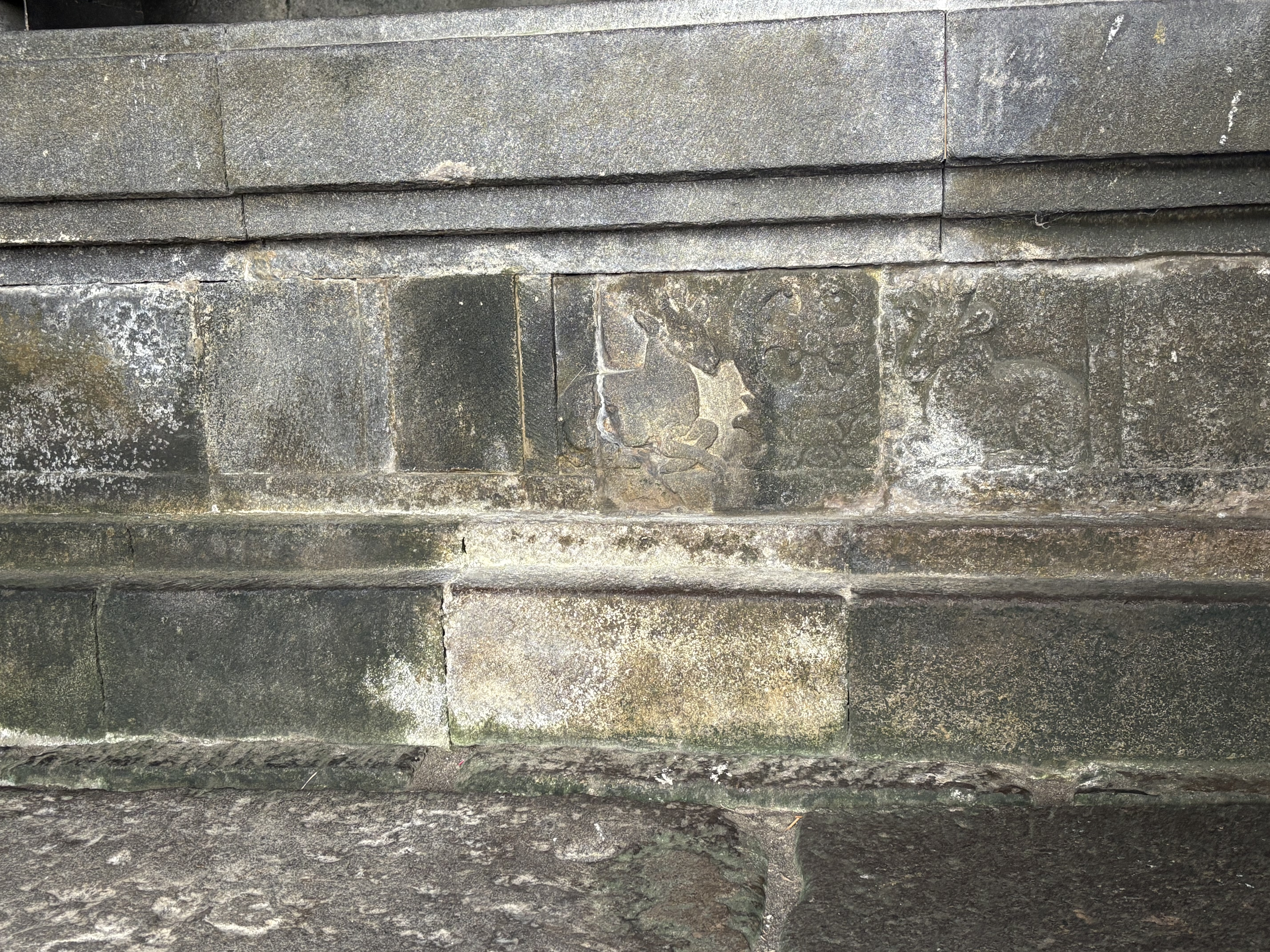
Bas-relief of Dharmacakra and Crouching Deers beneath the plinth inside the temple

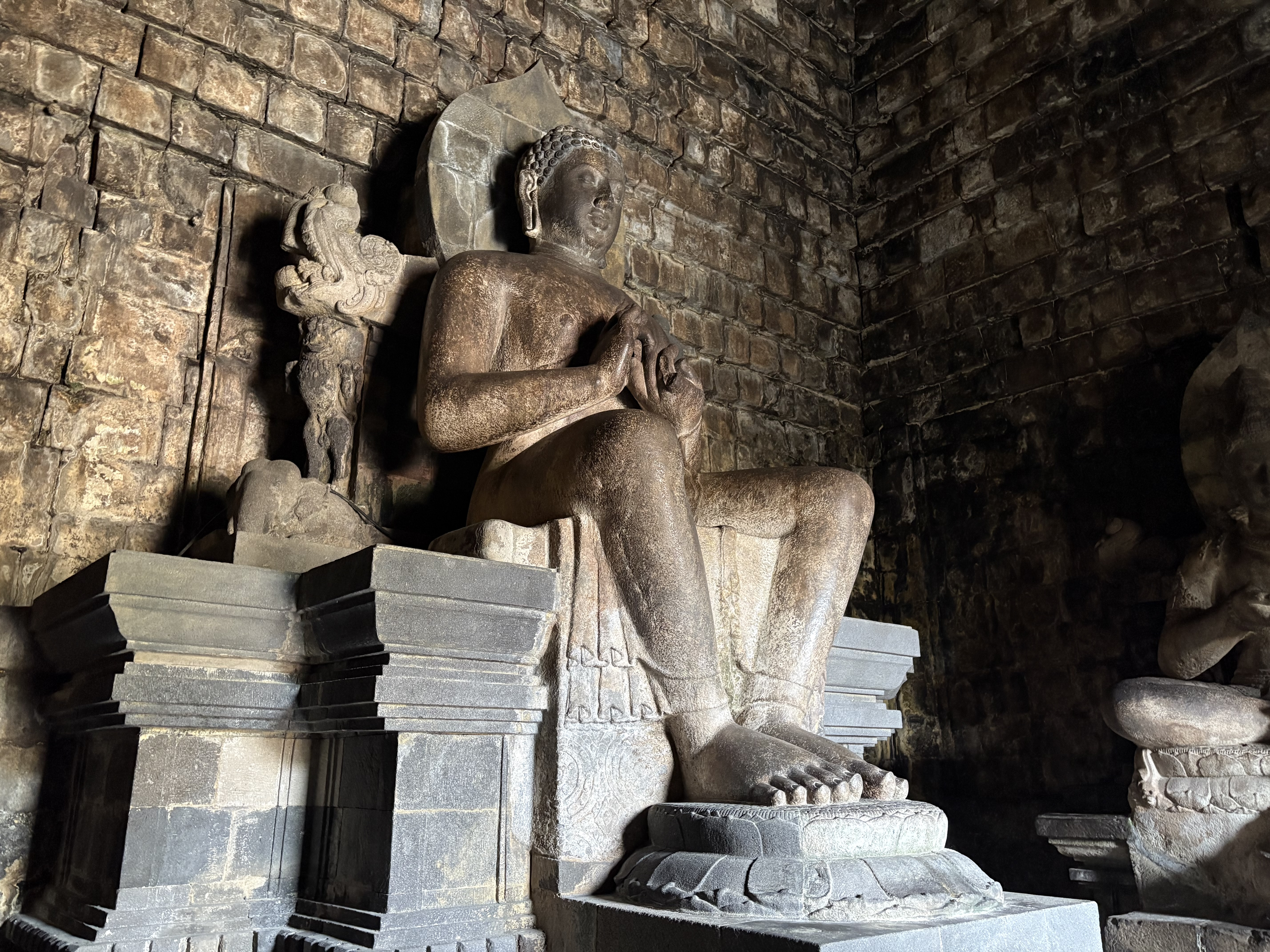
Statue of the Vairocana Buddha

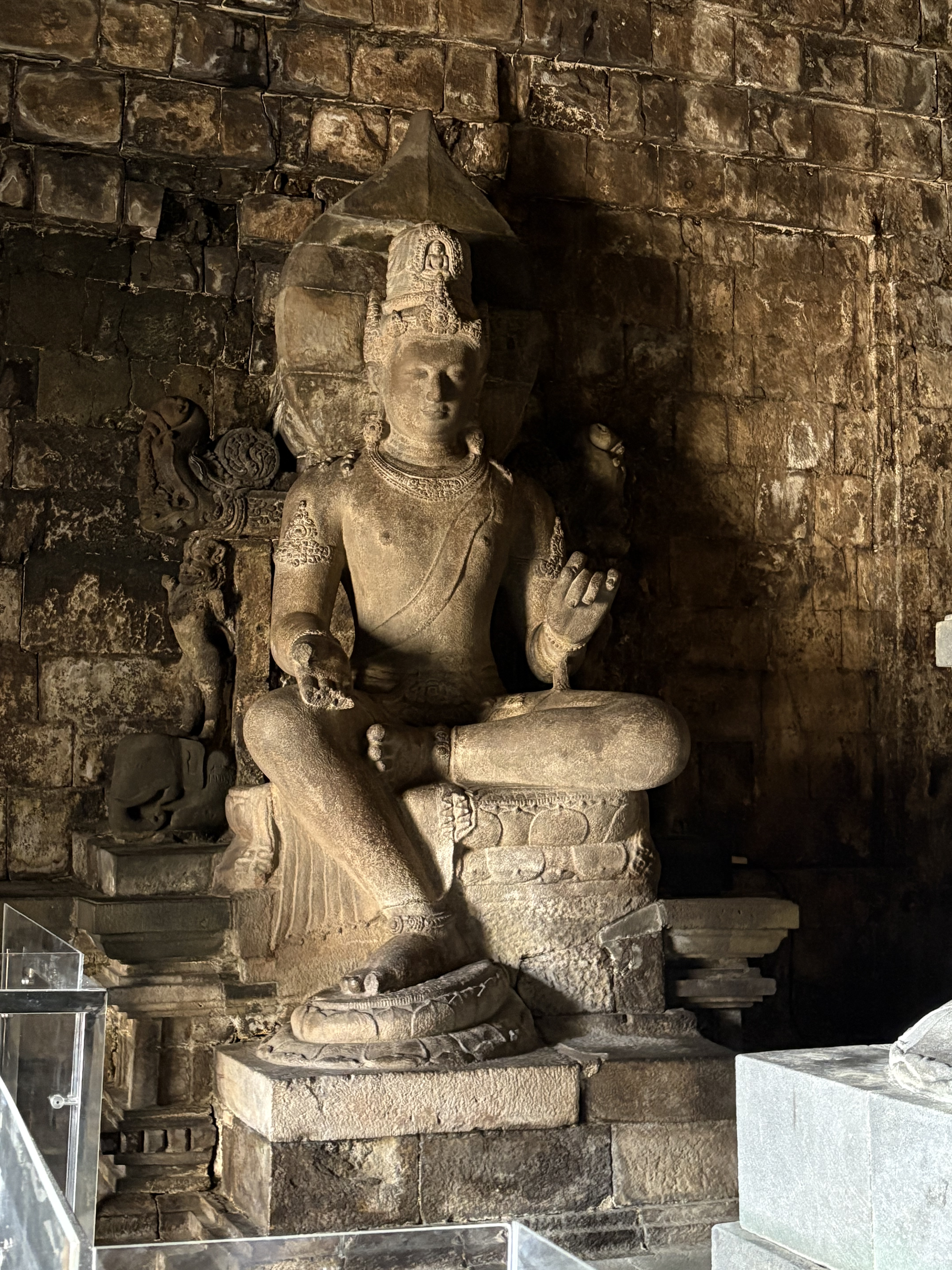
Statue of the Padmapani (Avalokiteshvara) Bodhisattava

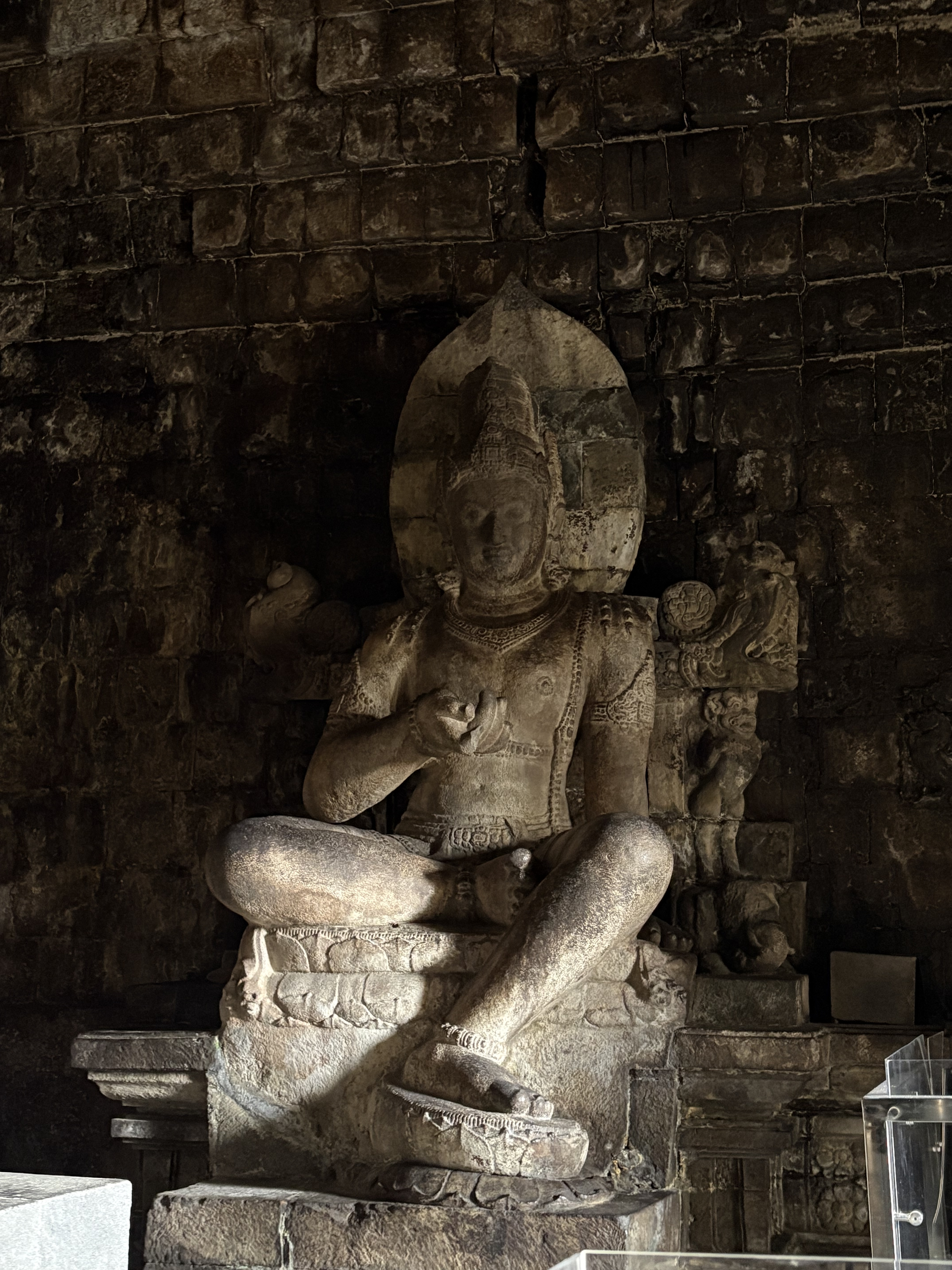
Statue of the Vajrapani Bodhisattava

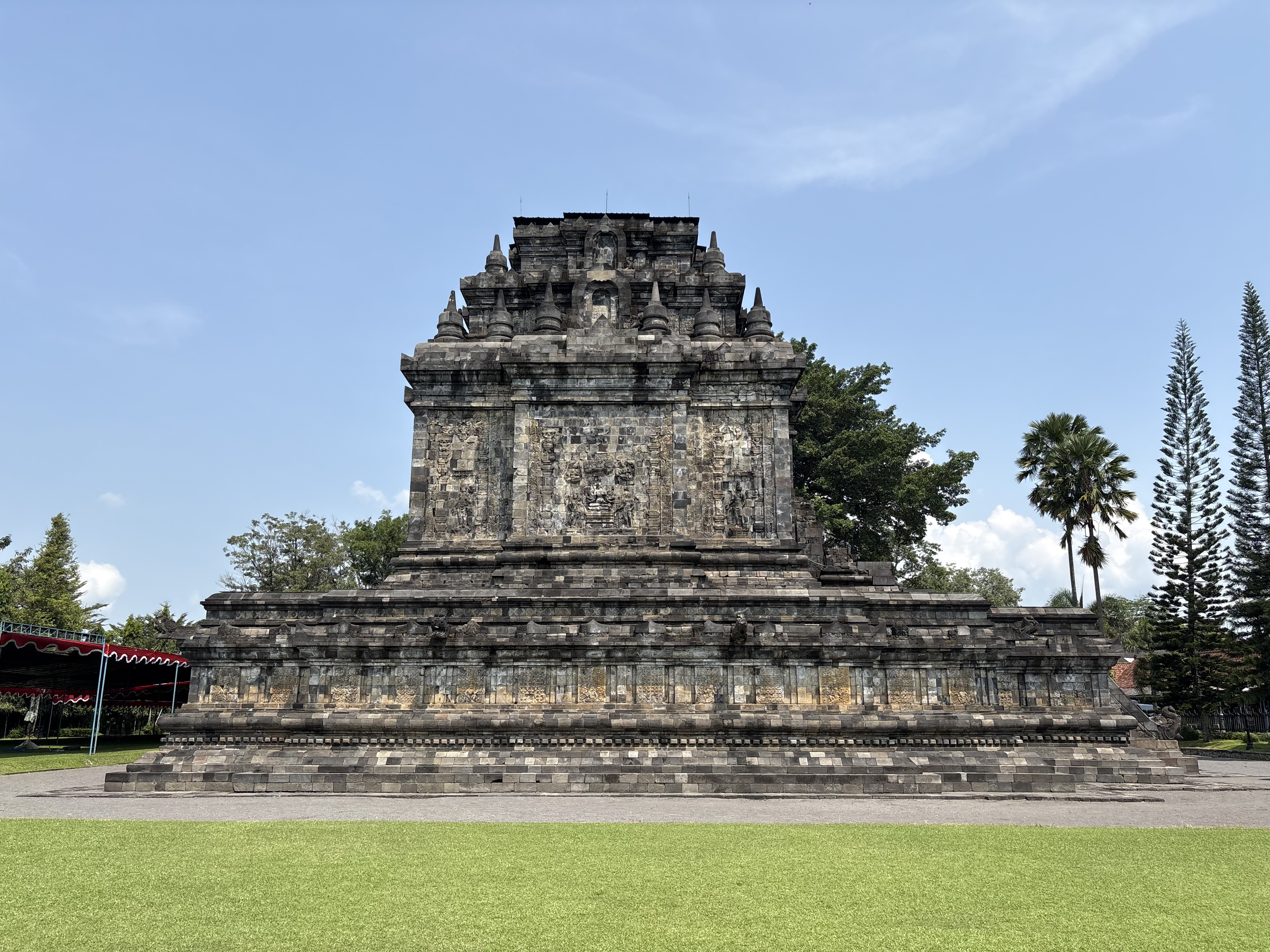
Northeastern facade

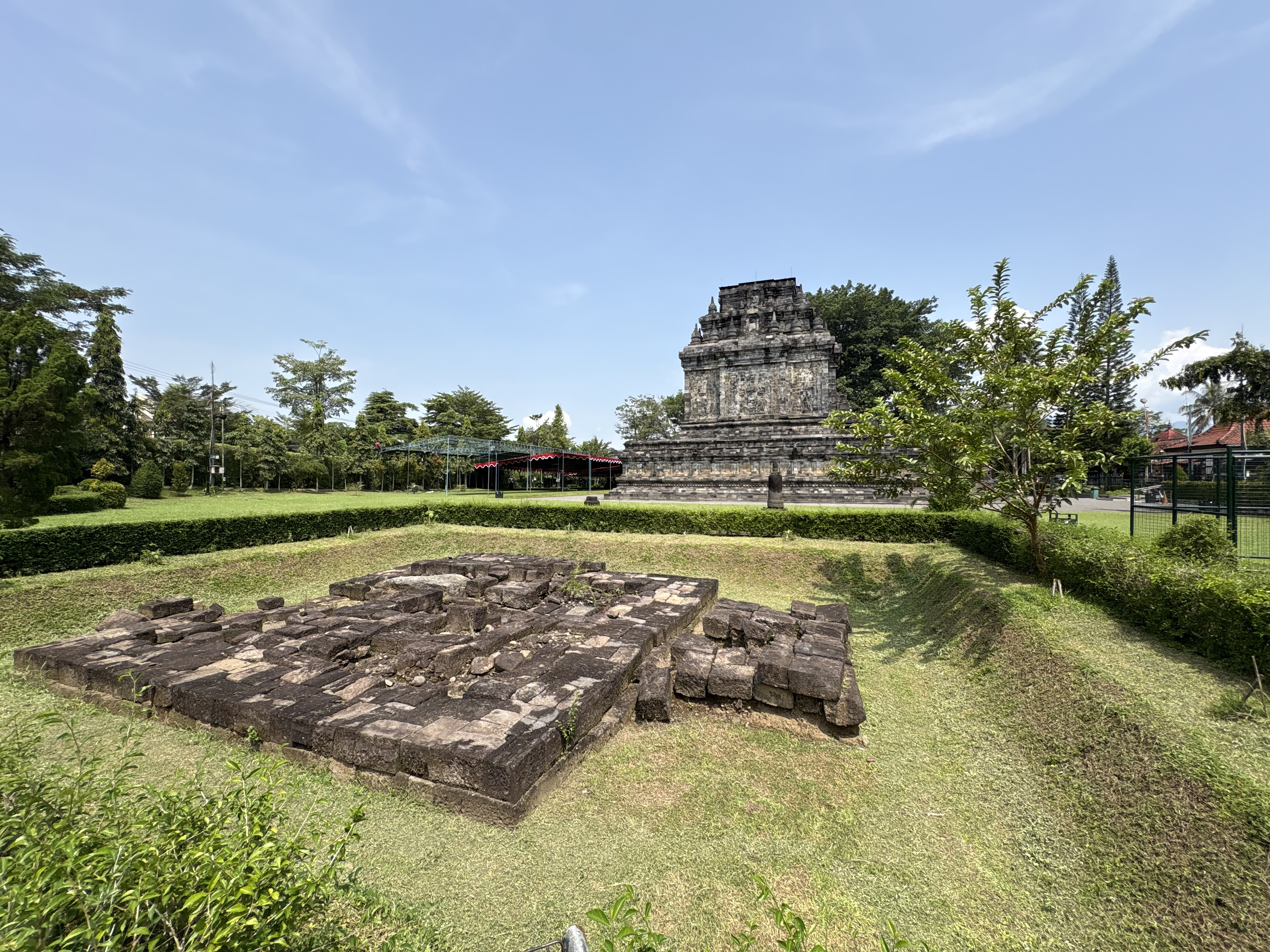
Destroyed temple on the northeast of Mendut Temple

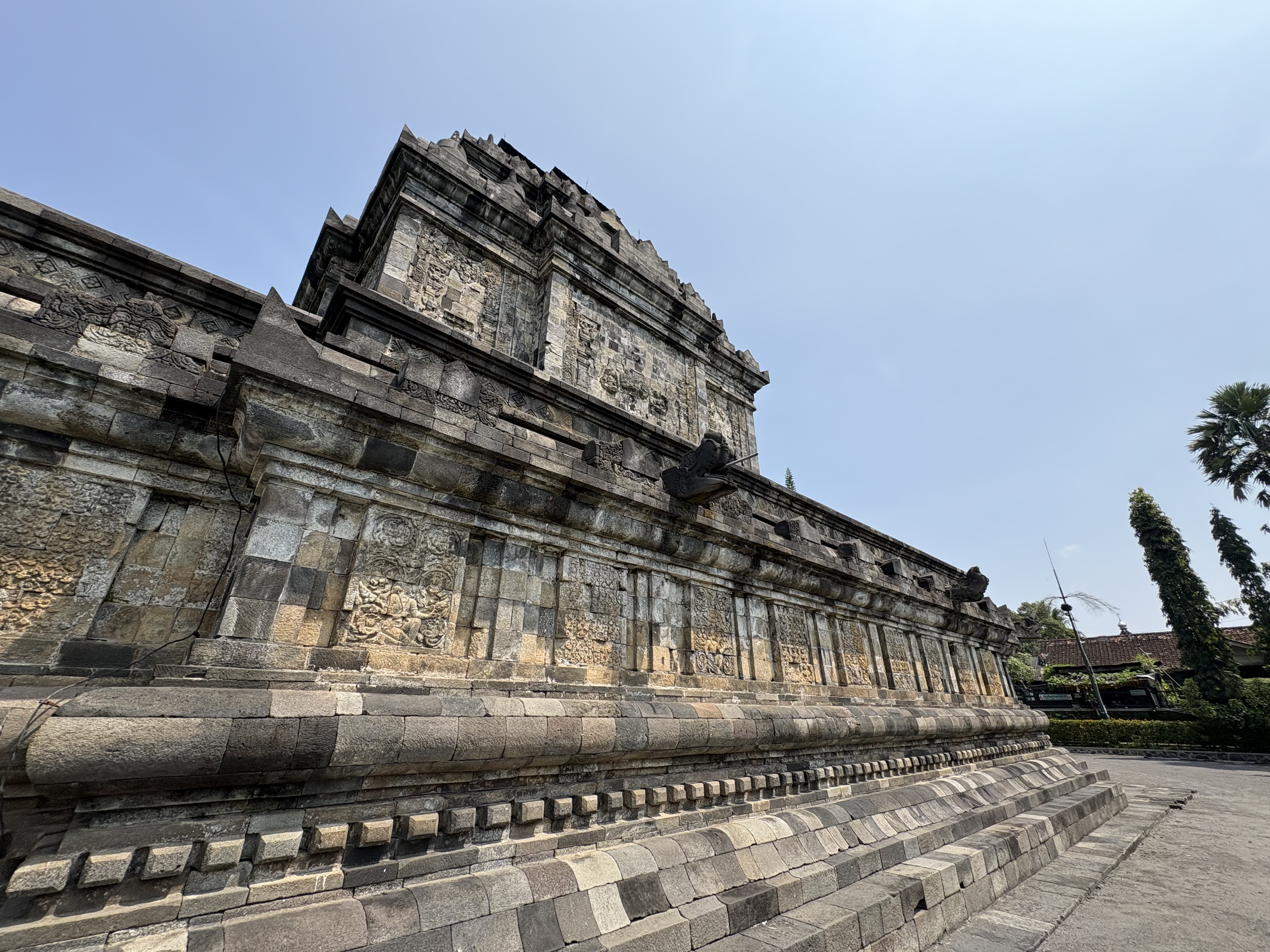
View from the base of the temple

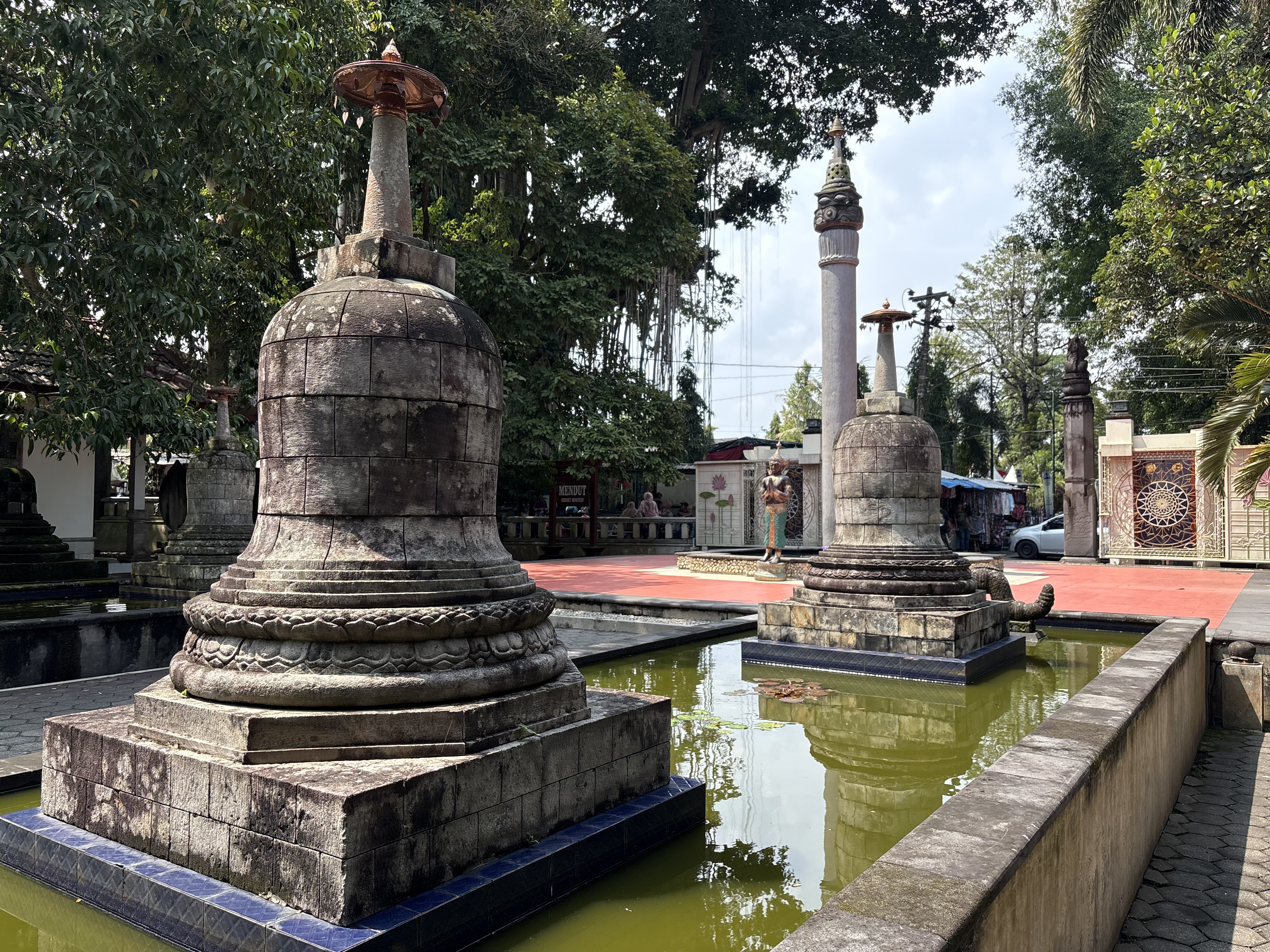
Mendut Buddhist Monastery, a present-day monastery located next to the site

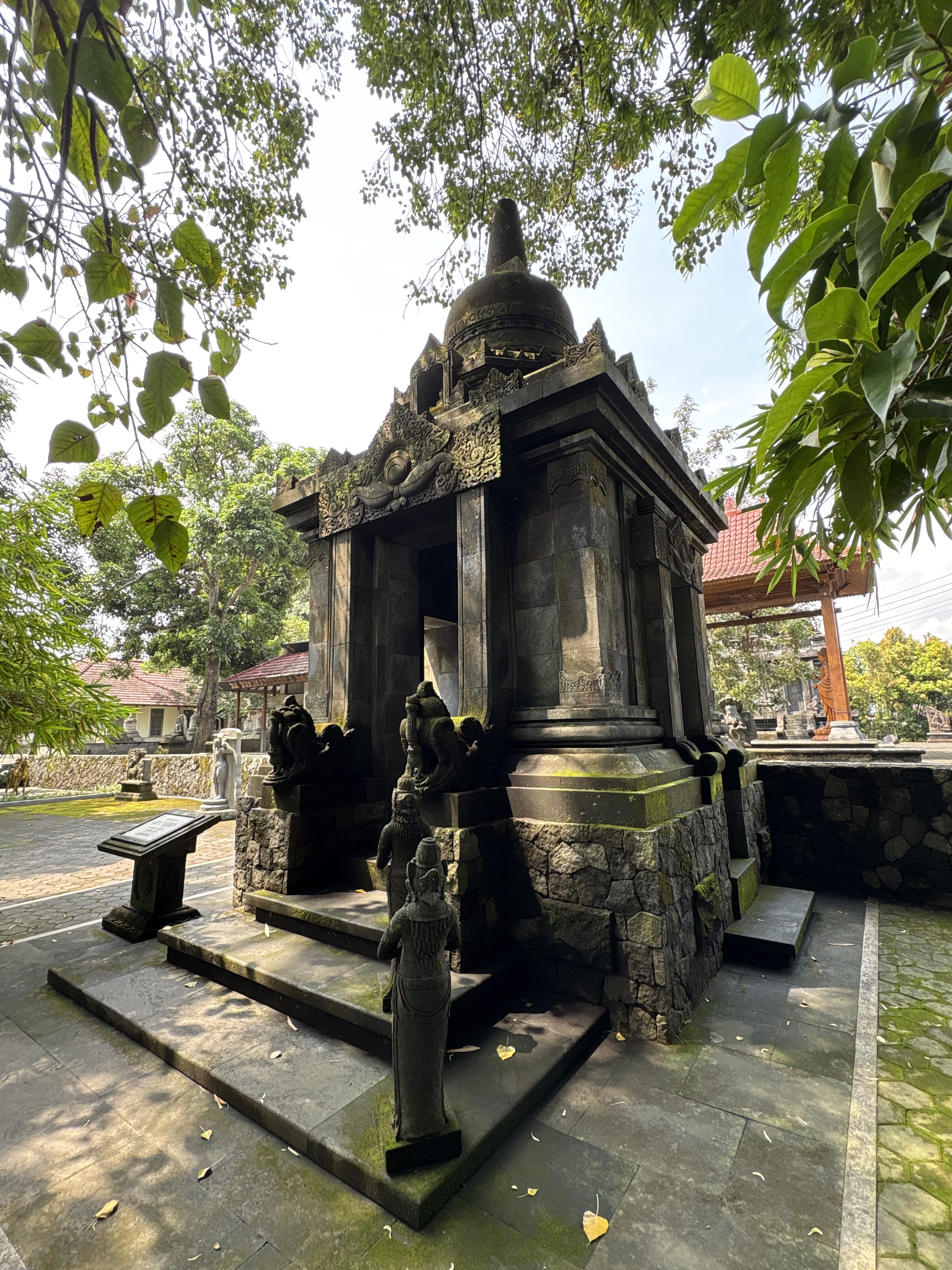
Candi Sangharājā in the Mendut Buddhist Monastery, built in the occasion of Vajirañāṇasaṃvara's 100th birthday

== See also ==
- Buddhism in Indonesia
- Candi of Indonesia
- Indonesian Esoteric Buddhism
- Borobudur
- Banyunibo
- Ngawen
- Pawon
