= Borobudur Temple Compounds =

- Kompleks Candi Borobudur (Indonesian)
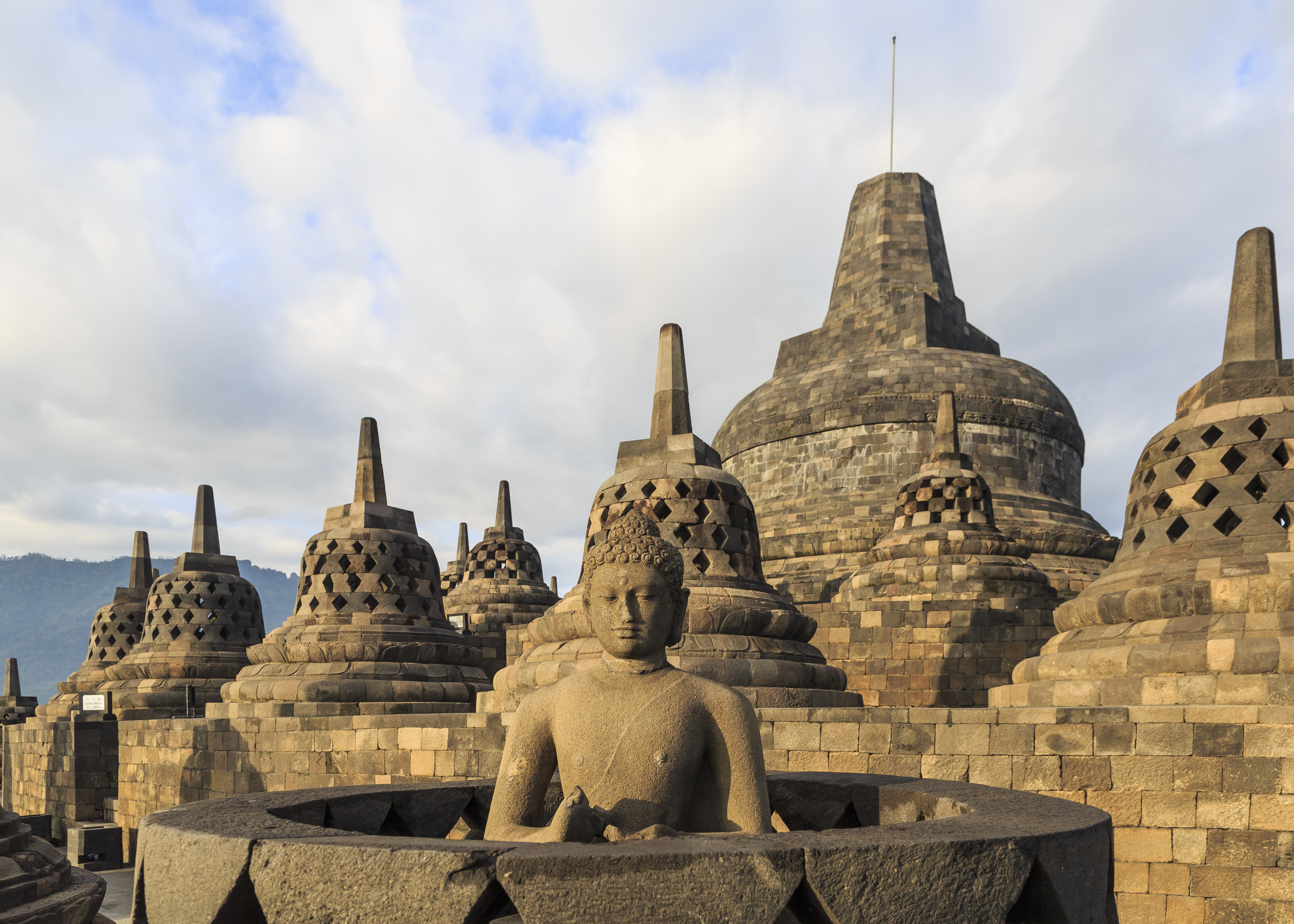
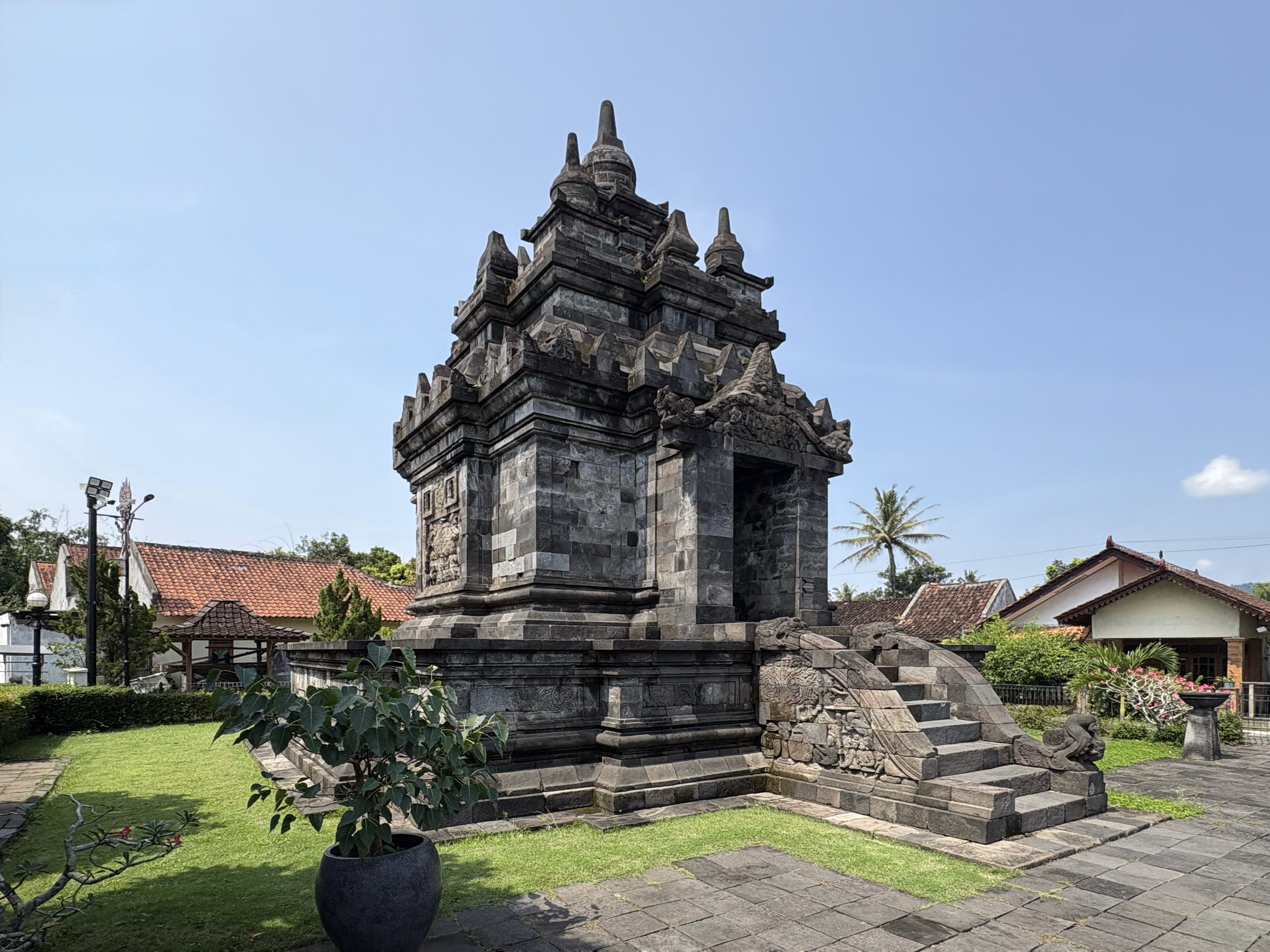
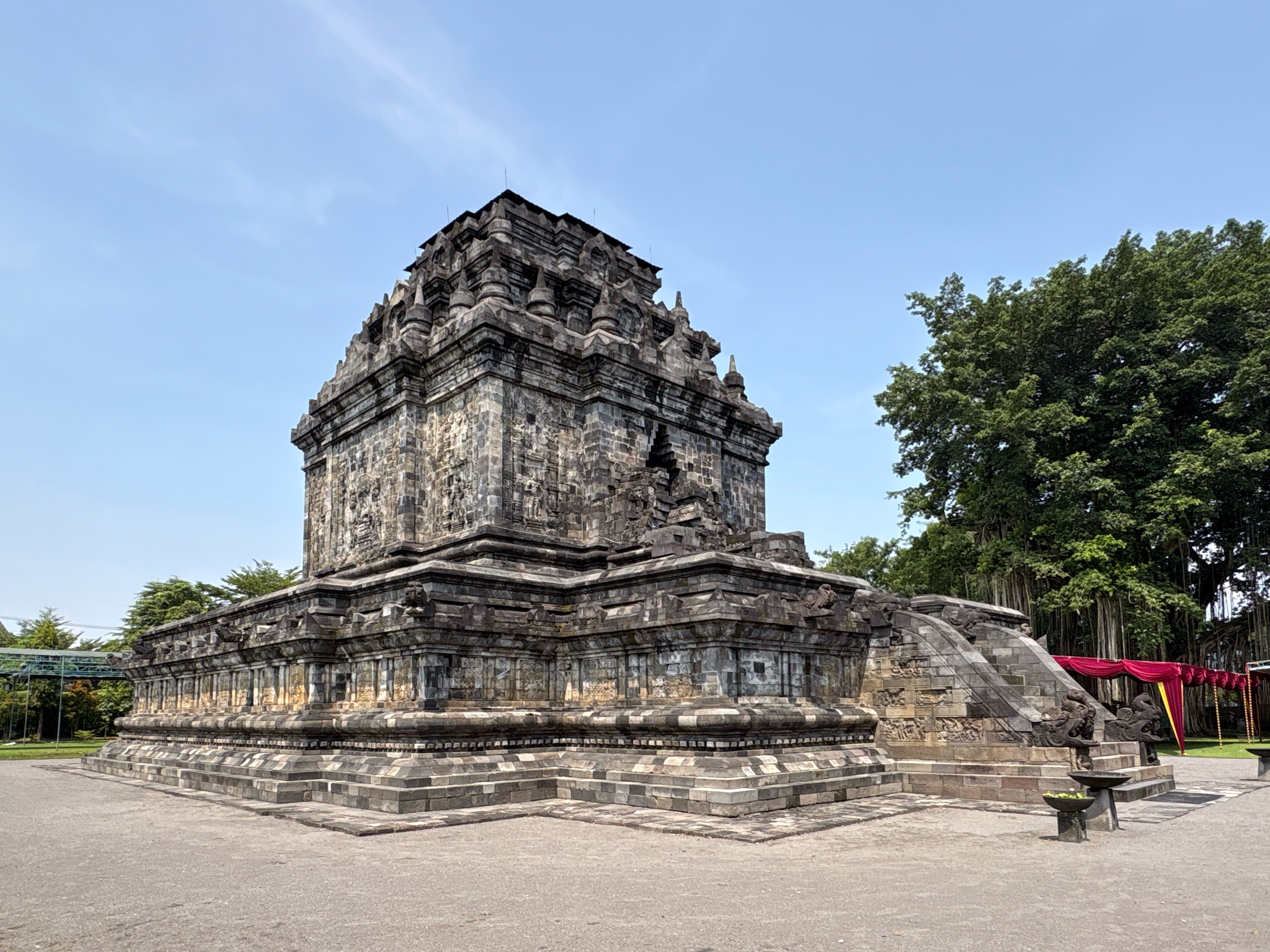
- Borobudur Pawon Temple Mendut Temple

- Location within Java Borobudur Temple Compounds (Indonesia)
- 7.608°S 110.204°E
- Location: Magelang, Central Java

UNESCO World Heritage Site
- Type: Cultural
- Criteria: i, ii, vi
- Designated: 1991 (15th session)
- Reference no.: 592
- Region: Southeast Asia
- Includes: Borobudur; Mendut; Pawon

Borobudur Temple Compounds is the World Heritage designation of the area of three Buddhist temples in Central Java, Indonesia. It comprises Borobudur, Mendut, and Pawon. The temples were built during the Shailendra dynasty around the 8th and 9th centuries CE and fall on a straight line.

Approximately 40 kilometres (25 mi) northwest of Yogyakarta, Borobudur sits on a plateau between two twin volcanoes, Sundoro-Sumbing and Merbabu-Merapi, and two rivers, the Progo and the Elo. According to local myth, the area known as Kedu Plain is a Javanese sacred place and has been dubbed 'the garden of Java' due to its high agricultural fertility.

== Alignment ==
Three temples – Borobudur, Pawon and Mendut – fall on a straight line

During restoration in the early 20th century, it was discovered that three Buddhist temples in the region, Borobudur, Pawon and Mendut, fall on a straight line. This may be coincidence, but is in agreement with a native folk tale that there was an ancient brick road from Borobudur to Mendut with walls on both sides. The three temples have similar architecture and ornamentation, which suggests a ritual relationship between them to form a sacred unity, although the exact ritual process is unknown.

== Museums ==
There are two museums within Borobudur Temple Compounds, Karmawibhangga Museum and Samudra Raksa Museum.

== Other archaeological sites ==
Other Buddhist temples and Hindu temples are scattered in the area. The earliest is Gunung Wukir or Canggal Hindu temple dated 732 CE. According to an Canggal inscription discovered in the temple complex, the Shivaite King Sanjaya commissioned a Shivalinga sanctuary to be built on the Wukir hill, only 10 km (6 mi) east of Borobudur.

Ngawen temple is found to the east of Mendut temple.

The ruin of Banon temple, a Hindu temple, is several hundred meters north of Pawon temple. It could not be reconstructed because many stones are missing, but several stone statues of Hindu gods were found in good condition. Those of Vishnu, Brahma, Shiva, and Ganesha are now at the National Museum of Indonesia, Jakarta.

== See also ==
- Buddhism in Indonesia
- Candi of Indonesia
- Greater India
- Gunung Padang Megalithic Site, in Western Java, part of which was developed during the Sunda Kingdom
- Hinduism in Java
- History of Indian influence on Southeast Asia
- Indonesian Esoteric Buddhism
- Prambanan Temple Compounds, UNESCO heritage listed 6th to 9th century CE Hindu temple in Central Java built by Shailendra dynasty of Mataram Kingdom
- Sunda Kingdom, Sundanese Hindu kingdom from 669 to 1579 CE in western and central Java including Gunung adang site.
