= Pawon =

9th-century Buddhist site in Indonesia

- ꦥꦮꦺꦴꦤ꧀ (Javanese)
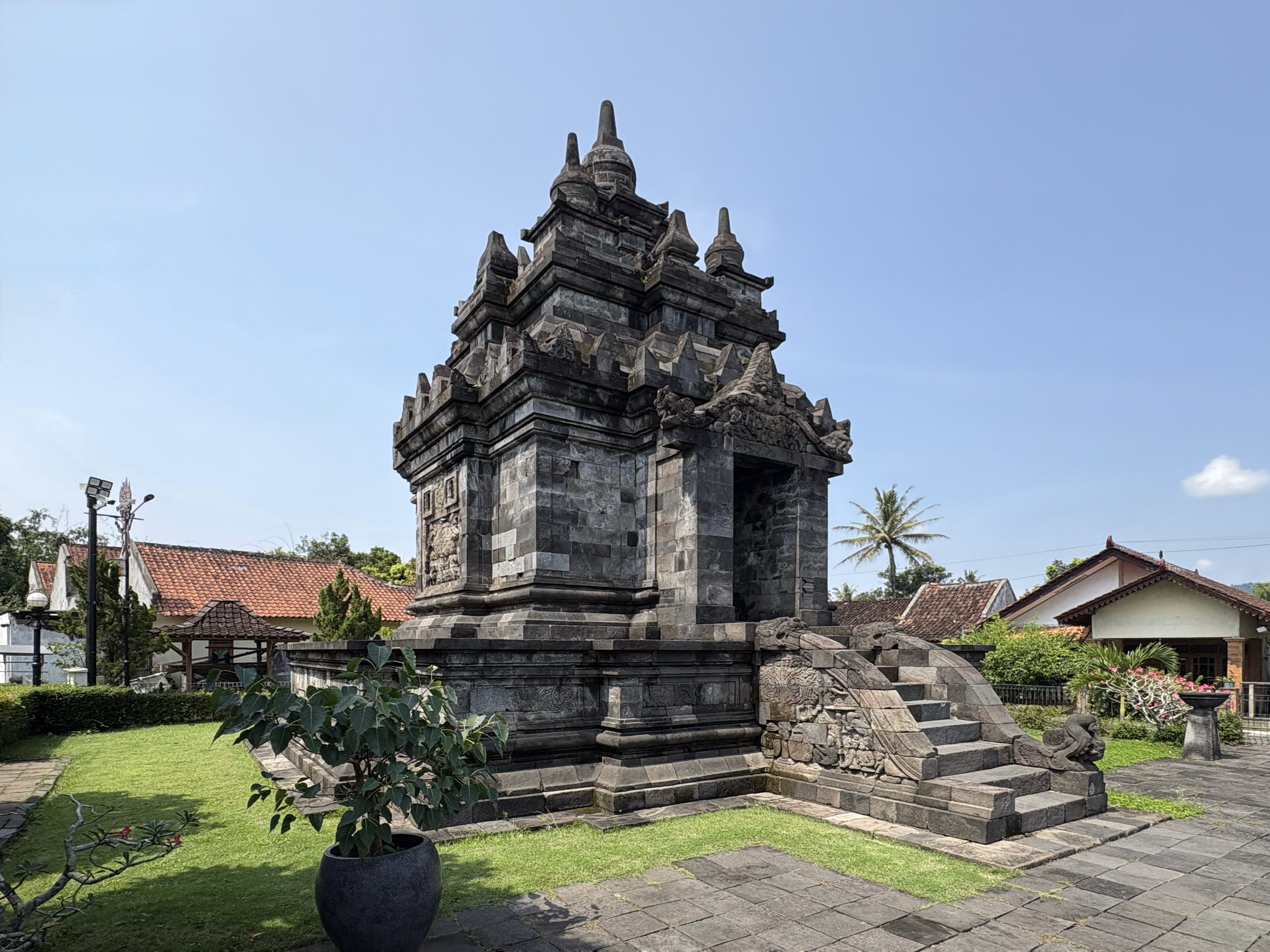
- Northwestern facade of Candi Pawon

- Location within Java Pawon (Indonesia)
- 7.60616°S 110.219522°E
- Location: Magelang, Central Java

History
- Built: Originally built in the 9th century during the reign of the Sailendra Dynasty

Site notes
- Architect: Gunadharma
- Restored: 1835
- Restored by: Sir Thomas Stamford Raffles

UNESCO World Heritage Site
- Type: Cultural
- Criteria: i, ii, vi
- Designated: 1991 (15th session)
- Part of: Borobudur Temple Compounds
- Reference no.: 592
- Region: Southeast Asia

Pawon (Indonesian: Candi Pawon) is a Buddhist temple in Central Java, Indonesia. Built during the Sailendra dynasty (8th–9th centuries), it is a part of the Borobudur Temple Compounds which consists of three temples located on the same axis; Borobudur, Pawon, and Mendut. All three temple are inscribed UNESCO World Heritage Sites.

== History ==
Location of the Buddhist temples triad: Borobudur-Pawon-Mendut in one straight line.

Located between two other Buddhist temples, Borobudur (1.75 km (1.09 mi) to the northeast) and Mendut (1.15 km (0.71 mi) to the southwest), Pawon is connected with the other two temples, all of which were built during the Sailendra dynasty (8th–9th centuries). Examining the detail and style of its carving this temple is slightly older than Borobudur.

The three temples were located on a straight line, suggesting there was a symbolic meaning that binds these temples. According to Yazir Marzuki and Toeti Heraty, "Between Mendut and Borobudur stands Pawon temple, a jewel of Javanese temple architecture. Most probably, this temple served to purify the mind before ascending Borobudur."

The original name of this Buddhist shrine is uncertain. Pawon means "kitchen" in the Javanese language, which is derived from the root word awu or dust. The connection to the word "dust" also suggests that this temple was probably built as a tomb or mortuary temple for a king. Pawon is from the word Per-awu-an (a place that contains dust), a temple that houses the dust or ashes of the cremated king. However, who was the personage that entombed here is still unknown. Local people name this temple "Bajranalan" based on the name of the village. Bajranalan is derived from the Sanskrit words Vajra (thunder or also a Buddhist ceremonial tool) and Anala (fire, flame).

== Architecture ==
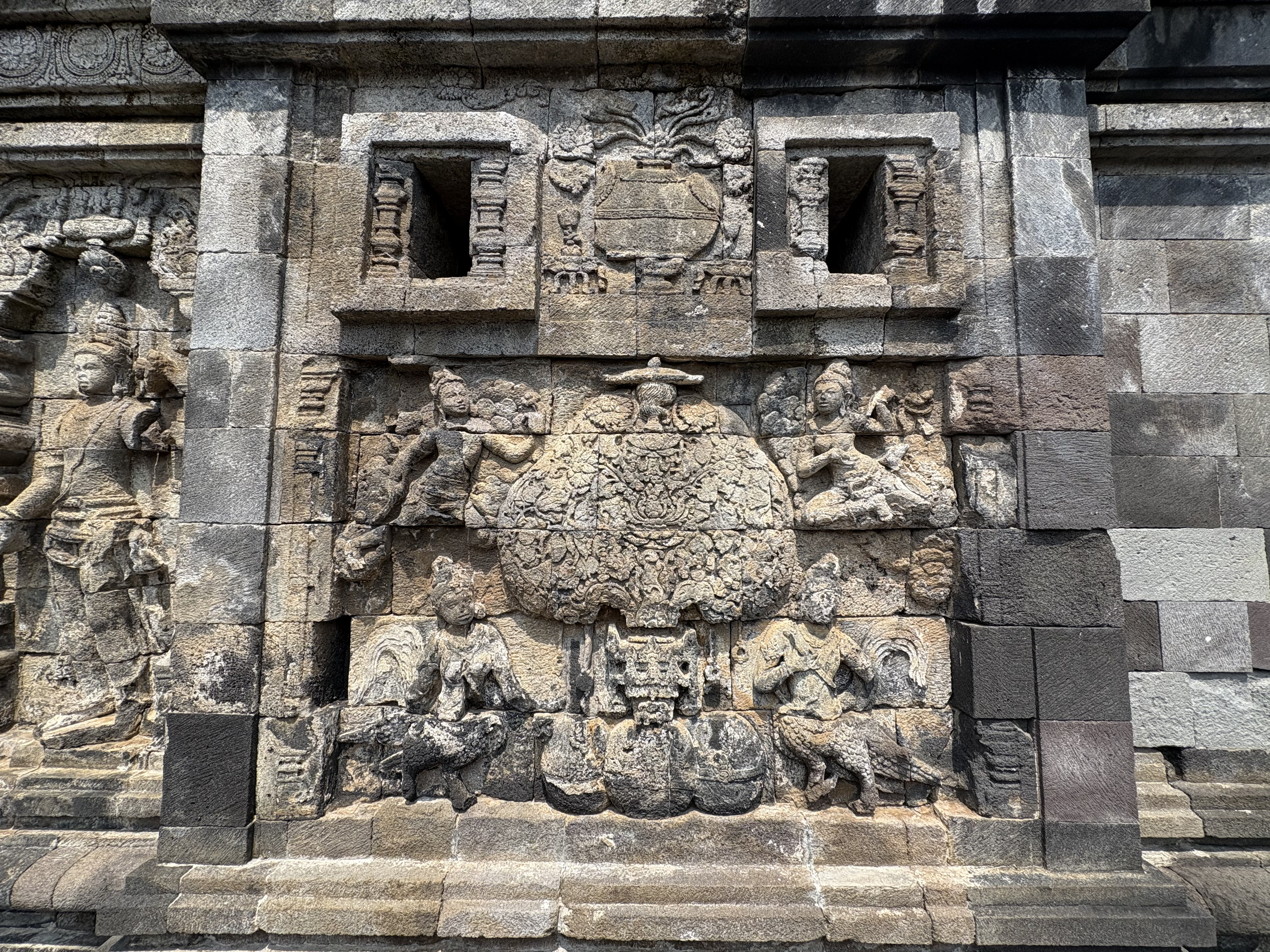
Reliefs on the northern wall depicting Kalpataru and Kalasha, amongst others

The temple slightly faces northwest and stands on a square base. Each side of the stairs and the top of the gates are adorned with carved Kala-Makara, commonly found in classic Javanese temples. The outer wall of Pawon is carved with reliefs of boddhisattvas and taras. There are also reliefs of kalpataru (tree of life), flanked between Kinnara-Kinnari. The square chamber inside is empty with a square basin in the center of it. Rectangular small windows were found, probably for ventilation.

The roof section is crowned with five small stupas and four small ratnas. Because of its relative simplicity, symmetry and harmony, the historians dubbed this small temple as "the jewel of Javanese temple architecture", in contrast with tall-slender East Javanese style counterparts as found in later Singhasari and Majapahit period.

== Rituals ==
In the contemporary era during the full moon in May or June, the Buddhist community in Indonesia observes Waisak and participates in the annual procession by walking from Mendut passing through Pawon and ends at Borobudur.

== See also ==
- Ancient temples of Java
- Buddhism in Indonesia
- Candi of Indonesia
- Borobudur
- Mendut
- Ngawen
