= Unfinished Buddha =

Statue in Karmawibhangga Museum

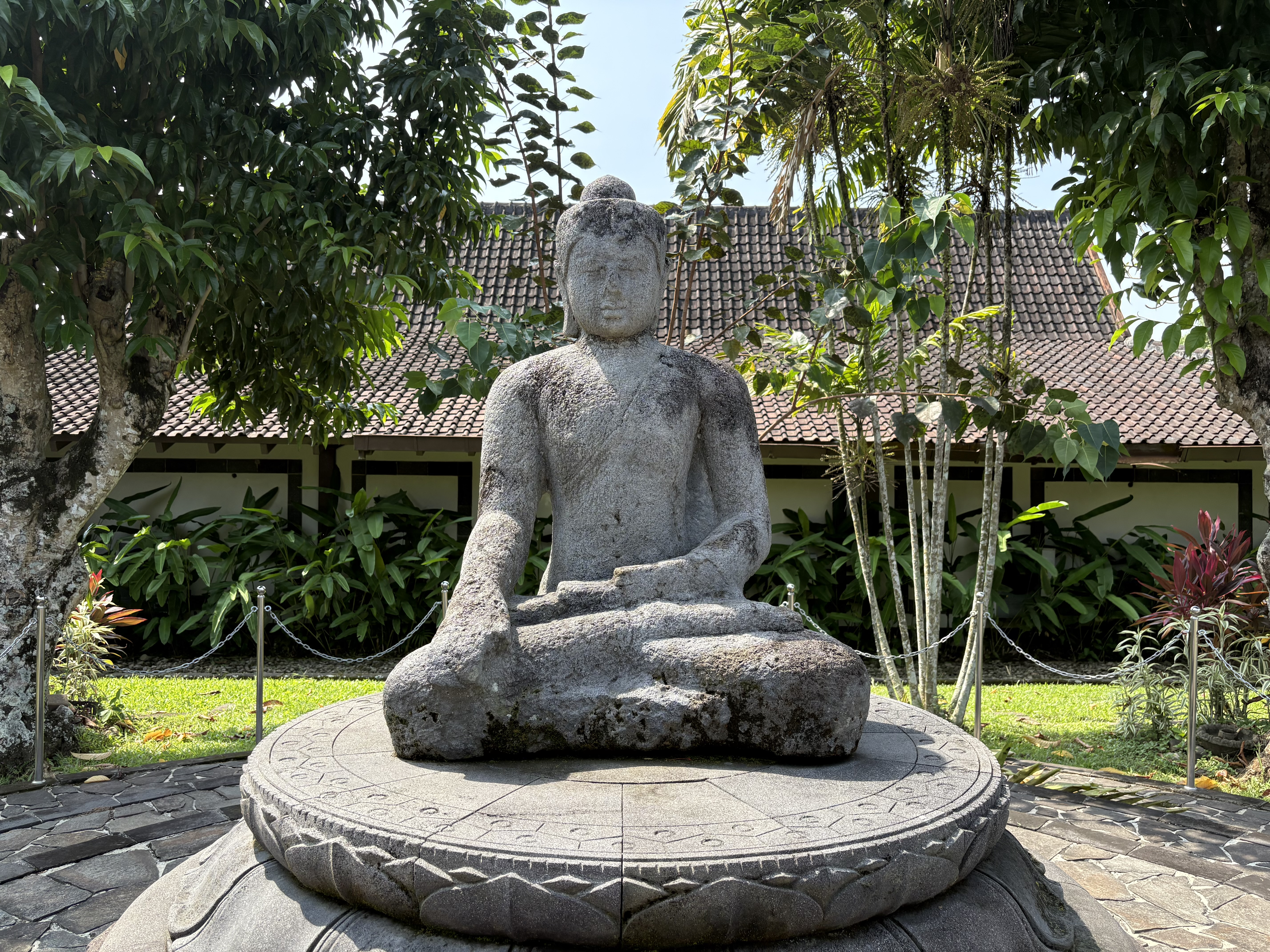
Unfinished Buddha of Borobudur, now displayed at Karmawibhangga Museum

The Unfinished Buddha is a statue which is believed to have originated from the largest stupa of Borobudur. It is currently located in Karmawibhangga Museum.

== Naming ==
The Unfinished Buddha is so-called because of its incomplete nature; the hands of the statue are not fully carved, the right arm is longer than the left and one of the shoulders is bigger than the other.

== History ==
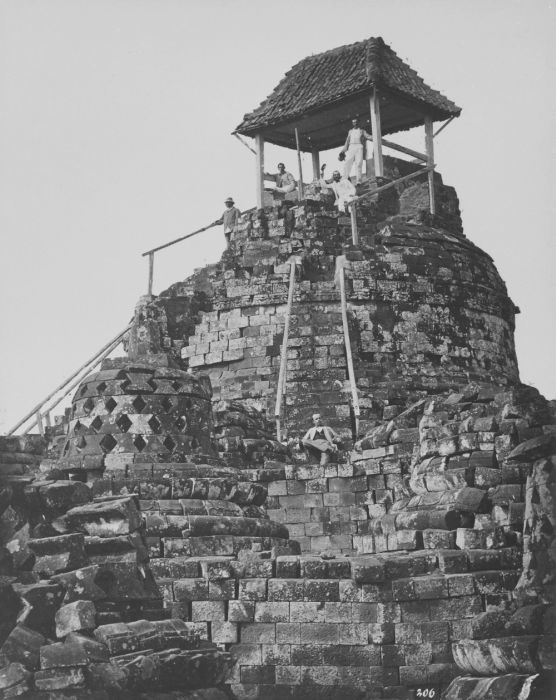
Borobudur's main stupa in mid 19th-century, a wooden deck had been installed above the main stupa.

The large central stupa that crowns the Borobudur monument has a hollow chamber within, that is completely walled off from the outside. When opened during the monument's restoration, it was found to contain an unfinished Buddha image that may represent a transcendent spiritual state.

Although the original location of the statue has been a matter of dispute, it is now appears that the statue was probably originally in the stupa: there is, however, a possibility that it might not have been established there as a religiously significant item. Some scholars argue that the statue is unfinished because it was deemed flawed. Rather than destroy a Buddha statue, the supervisor of the project may have placed it in the stupa simply to get rid of it.

From 1907 to 1911, Theodore Van Erp supervised the restoration of Borobudur. He found the main stupa was empty, but discovered the Unfinished Buddha buried in the dirt inside it. Because there was no proof regarding its origin at the time, Van Erp had it put under a pili tree next to the temple. He believed that the statue was a failed one and was thrown away. His opinion was supported by Prof. Soekmono in 1973, because the statue was never mentioned in the time of Borobudur's recovery in the era of Raffles in 1814.

Van Erp's action didn't go without negative critics by some archeologists, they commented that he should put it back inside the stupa instead of leaving it outside the temple. According to Bernard Kempers, this statue was intentional left unfinished, and from the Chinese record of 604 CE, there was a same misshaped Buddha statue in India.

In 1994, Prof. Soekmono wrote an archeological journal in which he told the true reason why he didn't put the statue back inside the main stupa. The reason is that they would have had to partially dismantle the stupa which was restored by Van Erp, and that that action would clash with the spirit of reconstruction of that time. But he believed that the misshaped statue was indeed originated from the inside of the main stupa. Based on Serat Centhini chapter 105 verses 8–9, Prof. Soekmono found a story about the statue. One night, Mas Cebolang, the main character of Serat Centhini, was sleeping next to the main stupa of Borobudur and saw a big Buddha statue which was unfinished. Cebolang asked why there was the unfinished statue in the top, and he considered that those statue was intentionally left broken.

105. Sinom	Javanese language	Translation
8	Umiyat kurungan sela tinarancang alus rêmit nglêbête kurungan sela isi rêca gêng satunggil nanging panggarapnèki kintên-kintên dèrèng rampung saranduning sarira kathah kang dèrèng cinawi kang samya myat langkung eram ing wardaya	An holey stone cage finely sculpted inside the stone cage only contain a single statue but the manufacture seems unfinished the whole body many have not been carved all who see were awe inside their heart
9	Mas Cêbolang angandika paran darunane iki rêca agung tur nèng pucak têka tan langkêp ing warni yèn pancèn durung dadi iku bangêt mokalipun baya pancèn jinarag êmbuh karêpe kang kardi mara padha udakaranên ing driya	Mas Cebolang said why is it a big statue on the top the form is unfinished if it really is unfinished that is very impossible whether it was intentional who knows the intention of the creator let's think inside our heart

Now the statue can be seen at Karmawibhangga Museum which is built on the ground of the Archeological Park created around Borobudur during the restoration sponsored by the Indonesian government and UNESCO that began in the 1970s.

== Model and symbolism ==
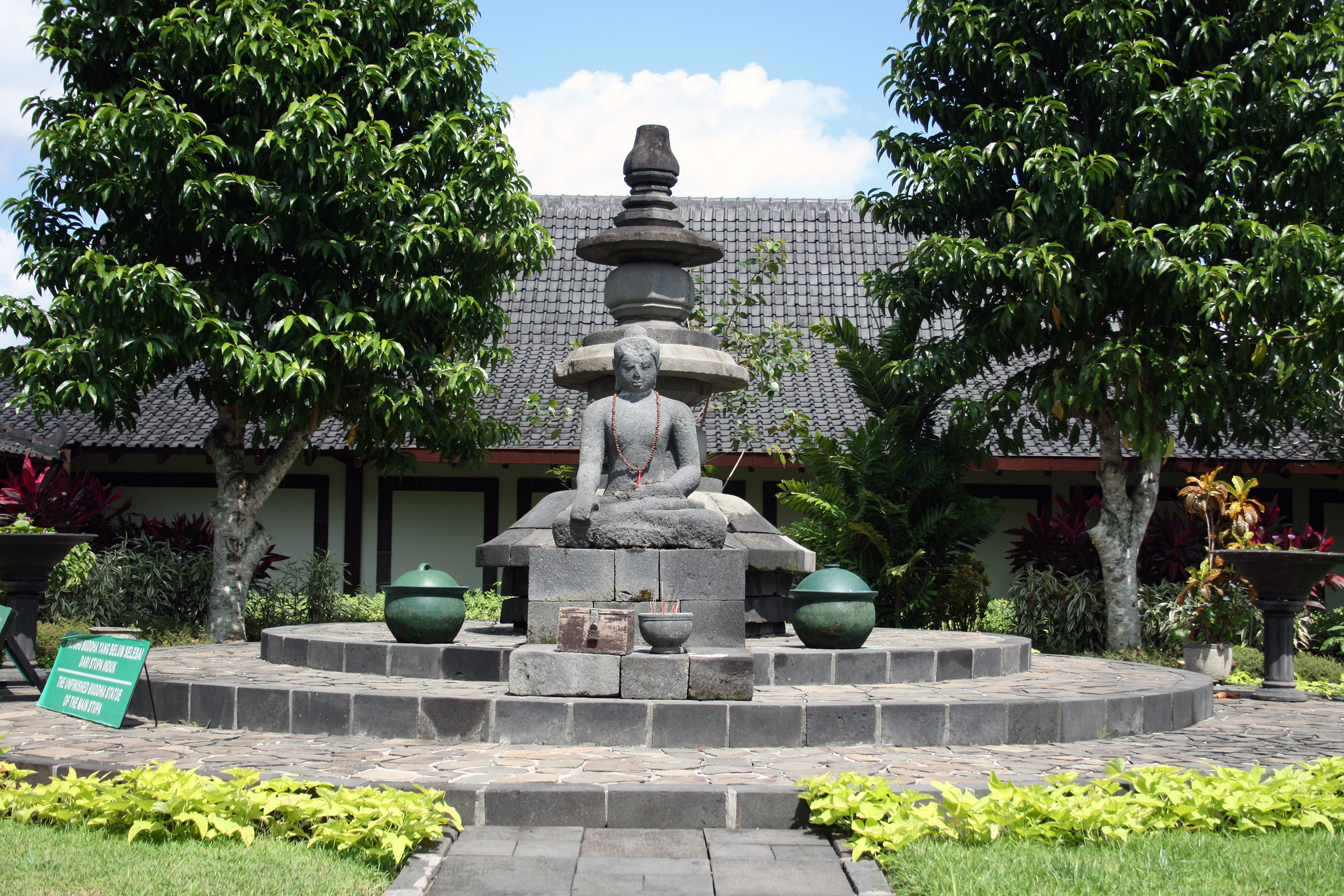
The Unfinished Buddha of the main stupa of Borobudur at Karmawibhangga Museum. On its back is chhatra or three-leveled parasol which was dismantled from the top of Borobudur's main stupa because of frequent lightning strike.

Although the right hand of unfinished Buddha statue looks rather like a squared-off mitten, it was clearly meant to display the bhūmiśparsa mudrā (mudra of touching earth).

=== The symbol of Vairochana (Adi Buddha) ===
Some scholars argue that the unfinished Buddha statue was established in the crowning stupa as the central figure of Borobudur mandala, and that its unfinished quality is symbolic. One of some reasons that lead to the opinion that this statue is the symbol of the Adi Buddha (or Vairochana as one of some personifications of Adi Buddha) is the interpretation of its imperfect form. It shows the local genius of the artists of that time. The imperfect form describes moksha: from the existence into the non-existence, from rūpa into arupa.

If one accepts the unfinished Buddha statue as a representation of the central Buddha of the mandala, then either Vairochana Buddha displays an uncharacteristic mudra (i.e. bhūmiśparsa mudrā) or the central Buddha is not Vairochana.

If one doesn't accept the unfinished Buddha, then the mandala has no figurative representation on its center, and one must explain why the "central" Buddha Vairochana (see Five Dhyani Buddhas) has been displaced. But then, the program of Buddha statues on Borobudur doesn't match the Five Buddha Mandala pattern perfectly because it includes at least six and possibly seven different Buddhas.

=== The symbol of Shakyamuni ===
As a 3 dimensional mandala, Borobudur present nothing similar to other mandalas such as Indian, Nepal, or Japanese mandala. The figures of Five Buddhas Mandala are accompanied by a host of other figures, but Borobudur has too few statues. There can be only two text groups definitely are associated with Borobudur stupa, i.e. Avatamsaka Sutra (especially Gandavyuha portion) and an uncertain text or texts from the Mahāvairocana cycle (possibility Mahāvairocanasūtra, Vajraśekhara, Sarvatathāgatatattvasaṃgraha, or Sarvadurgatipariśodhanatantra).

By based the research on Avatamsaka Sutra, some scholars assumes that the unfinished Buddha in the center of Borobudur is the symbol of Shakyamuni. There is a tradition in the sutra itself that the Avatamsaka Sutra was taught by Sakyamuni immediately after the enlightenment.

Thus I have heard, At one time the Buddha was in the land of Magadha, in a state of purity, at the site of the enlightenment, having just realized true awareness'.

The theory is supported by the fact that the unfinished Buddha statue shows the bhūmiśparsa mudrā, a mudra which was displayed by Sakyamuni to call the earth as his witness for his enlightenment. Meanwhile, Vairochana is displayed as the 72 dharmacaktamudrā Buddhas of the upper three terraces of Borobudur. In Buddhist iconographies throughout Asia, various forms of Buddhas displaying dharmacaktamudrā are associated with Vairochana, at Dunhuang for example.

Earlier authors were simply not in a position to make this realization. It is unimaginable "that after having been shown the utmost future we are to be drawn back again to the toiling earth, to the things that our thoughts on the first gallery, the preaching Çakyamuni".

=== Bhatara Buddha ===
According to the research of W.F. Stutterheim, a Dutch archeologist, the Sanghyang Kamahayanikan text mentions that Borobudur has 505 Buddha statues. The highest embodiment statue is the statue of Bhatara Buddha who is invisible. For the Buddha statues at Borobudur is now only 504, Stutterheim concluded that the unfinished Buddha statue is the Bhatara Buddha.

== See also ==
- Borobudur
