= Gunadharma =

Gunadharma or Gunadarma is claimed as the name of the architect of Borobudur, the ninth-century Buddhist monument in Central Java, Indonesia.
