= Sang Hyang Kamahayanikan =

Part of the prose literature of Javanese people

Sang Hyang Kamahayanikan is part of the prose literature of the Javanese people. This Tantric Buddhist treatise describes Javanese Buddhism, architecture, and iconography. The back side of this literature contains the name of the Javanese king, i.e. Mpu Sindok, which is throned at East Java from 929 to 947 CE.

In his dissertation, Noehardi Magetsari (2000) mentioned that the structure of Borobudur shows the developmental stages of a yogi's experiences to achieve Buddhahood where feelings and thoughts stop. Borobudur's popular term of Kamadhatu, Rupadhatu, Arupadhatu are also contained in Sanghyang Kamahayanikan.

== History ==
It was written about 929-947 CE by Mpu Shri Sambhara Surya Warama from East Java, the successor of the Mataram kingdom which was shifted to East Java. The oldest literature was found on Lombok Island in 1900. Professor Yunboll discussed it in 1908 and then it was translated into Dutch by J. DeKatt in 1940. Later on, it was inspected by Professor Wuff. This literature was translated into Indonesian by I Gusti Bagus Sugriwa. The last process in the translation was done by "Translation Team of Buddhist Scriptures Ditura Buddha, Indonesian Ministry of Religious Affairs."

== Contents ==
This literature contains Mahayana (especially Vajrayana) Buddhism teachings, mostly about the list of deities found in Mahayana Buddhism- which is often matched with the placement of the Buddhist kings in the Borobudur temple. The literature also contains the procedures for meditation.

According to D.K. Widya, Sanghyang Kamahayanikan teaches how one can attain Buddhahood, i.e. a student must first practice Pāramitā, then describe Paramaguhya and Mahaguhya. In addition, it also explained the philosophy of Adwaya overcoming the dualism of "existence" and "non-existence". In the book, there is a very detailed description of how a tantric yogi prepares himself for a spiritual path, from the start until the implementation of multilevel worships. It is said that the Vajrayana doctrine is meditation towards the Five Tathagata. By worshipping them, a yogi can attain the purity of mind.

== Popular culture ==
The Sang Hyang Kamahayanikan Award is an award from the Borobudur Writers and Cultural Festival for any individual or group who has been responsible and has contributed greatly to the cultural and historical assessment of Indonesia. The award is mainly conferred to Indonesian or international historians, writers, archaeologists, cultural, and historical background authors, playwrights, puppeteer, clergy, philologist, and so on.

== See also ==
- Mahāyāna sūtras
- A Record of Buddhist Practices Sent Home from the Southern Sea
