= Karmawibhangga Museum =

Karmawibhangga Museum Museum Karmawibhangga
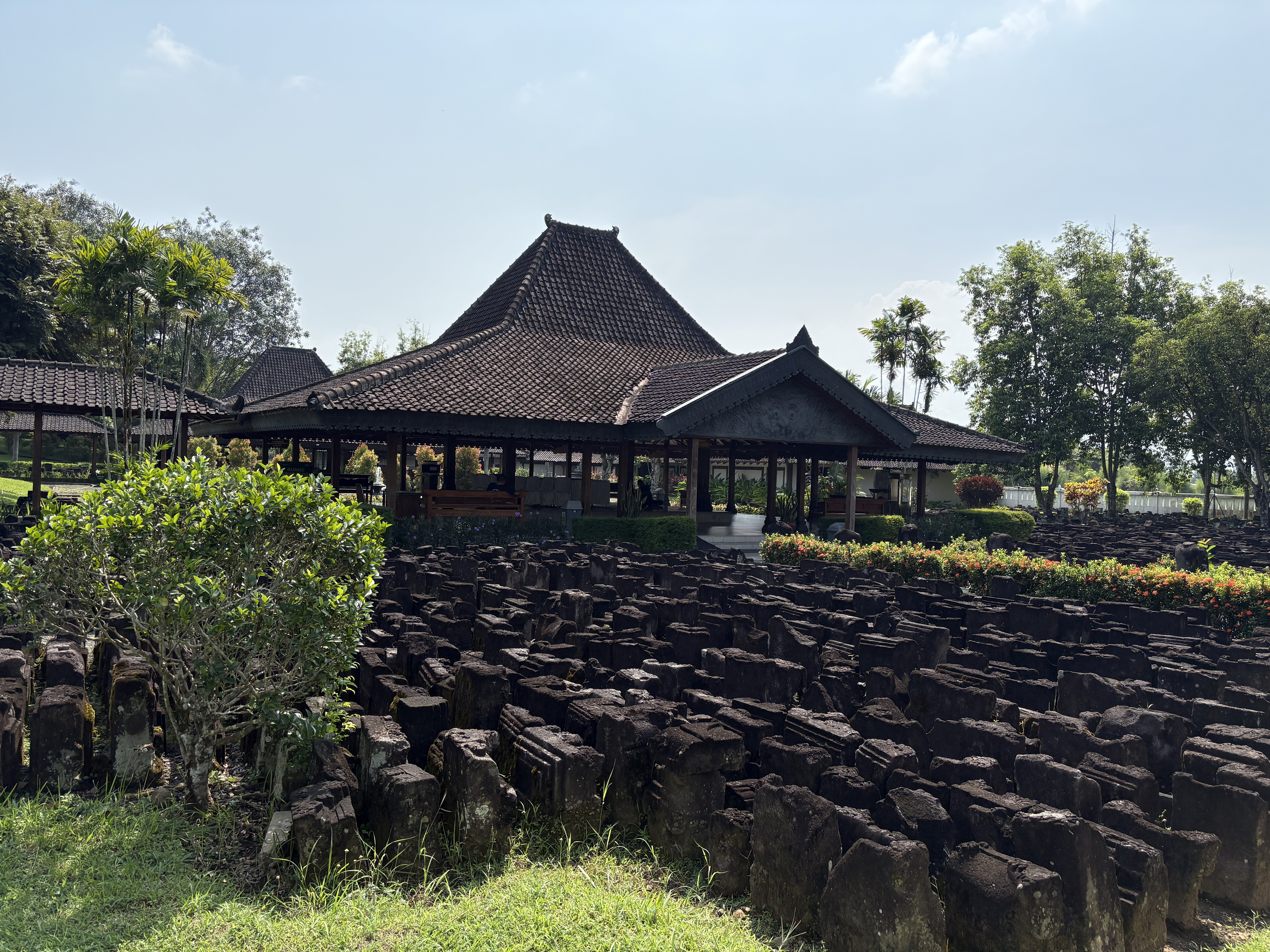
- Ruins of stone carvings from Borobudur stacked against the Javanese Pendapa at Karmawibhangga Museum
- Established: 1983
- Location: Taman Wisata Candi Borobudur, Jalan Badrawati, Borobudur, Magelang, Central Java 56553, Indonesia
- Type: Archaeology museum
- Website: www.borobudurpark.com/temple/museumBorobudur

Karmawibhangga Museum also known as Borobudur Museum, is an archaeology museum located just several hundred meters north of 8th century Borobudur Buddhist monument, within Borobudur Archaeological Park, Magelang Regency, Central Java, Indonesia. The museum featuring pictures of Karmawibhangga bas reliefs carved on the hidden foot of Borobudur, some disassembled Borobudur stones, archaeological artifacts found around Borobudur and Central Java. The museum also displays the Borobudur architecture and structure, also the documentation of restoration project conducted between 1975 and 1982 under UNESCO guidance. The museum was built in traditional Javanese architecture; the joglo house with pendopo pavilion. The museum is integrated within Borobudur Archaeological Park inaugurated in 1983.

Also located within Borobudur archaeological complex, right on west side of Karmawibhangga Museum is Samudra Raksa Museum displaying Borobudur Ship. The entry to both museums are included within the entrance ticket of Borobudur Archaeological Park.

== Exhibits ==
The museum was built as integrated part within Borobudur Archaeological Park.

=== Karmawibhangga bas reliefs ===
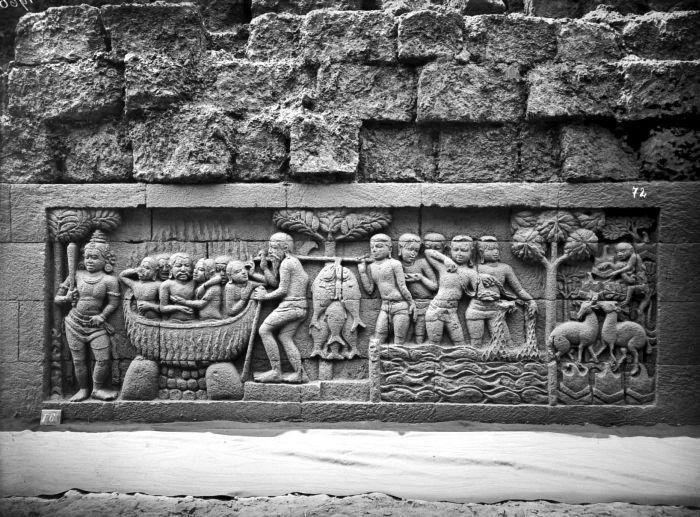
Relief O 109 on a hidden panel with two scene in one frame read from right to left, the right scene depicting two deer and monkey watching four fishermen catching fish with the net, while other two fishmonger carry the caught fish with a pole probably to the market, on the left describe six men being cooked alive by an asura demon in hell. This scene describes cause-and-effect law, that people who kill creatures for living, such as hunters and fishermen in the afterlife will be put in hell and must endure torture by being cooked or boiled alive.

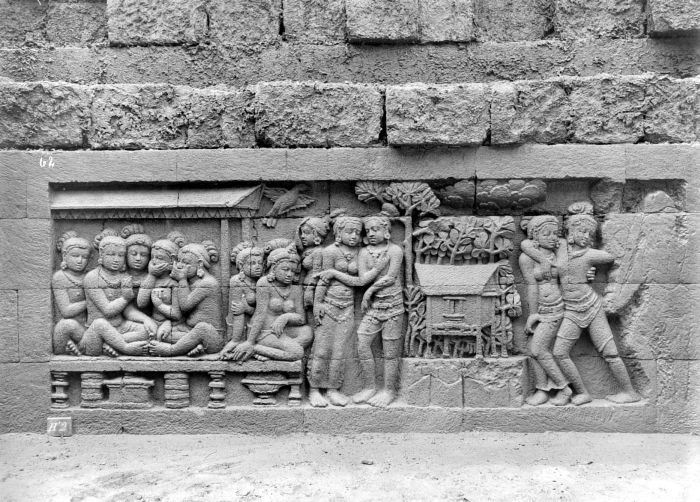
Relief O 119 on a hidden panel, scene on the right describing adulterous and promiscuous behavior would lead to dirty gossip and scandal, yet it is also describes the harm of spreading lies, rumors and false gossip.

The base level of Borobudur illustrating the first of the three zones of consciousness in Buddhist concept; the Kamadhatu or "desire realm". This series of reliefs is known as the Mahakarmawibhangga or simply Karmawibhangga and represents the realm of desire. These 160 hidden panels do not form a continuous story, but each panel provides one complete illustration of cause and effect.

The depiction of theft, murder, rape, abortion and torture appear amongst other immoral acts. The direct or indirect result of these acts is shown to be a tortuous afterlife. The depiction of hell includes the cutting up of bodies with a saw, burning bodies, and bondage with hot chains. There are also praiseworthy activities, that include charity and pilgrimage to sanctuaries, and their subsequent rewards. The reliefs also depict more harmonious topics including working together, agricultural methods, and planned parenthood. The pains of hell and the pleasure of heaven are also illustrated. There are scenes of daily life, complete with description of samsara (the endless cycle of birth and death). Some of the panels have inscriptions which are believed to have been instructions to the carvers. Some panels remain unfinished, and this gives rise to the theory that the additional base was added before the temple had been completed.

However these 'hidden foot' of Borobudur with exquisite bas-reliefs is covered with additional encasement, the purpose of which remains a mystery. The encasement base was built with detailed and meticulous design and with aesthetic and religious consideration. Apart from southeast corner which has been revealed for visitors, it is not possible to see the remaining reliefs remain hidden below the supporting structure. The encasement base of the Borobudur temple was disassembled to reveal the hidden foot and the reliefs were photographed by Kassian Cephas in 1890. It is these photographs that are displayed in this museum.

=== Borobudur stone blocks ===
Approximately 4,000 of the original stones and carvings from the temple are stored in this museum. These include some disassembled stone blocks, decorative panels, parts of reliefs and structures are stored in the open air field within museum compound. These stone blocks could not be included within Borobudur structure because of missing connecting parts. Borobudur structures are interlocking stone blocks and sometimes replacement new stones are added to replace the missing ones. Some of the important stone blocks displayed here are the chattra, the triple-tiered stone umbrellas served as the pinnacle of Borobudur main stupa. The chattra was reconstructed by Theodoor Van Erp during restoration project between 1907 and 1911. Although the chattra was carefully reconstructed, there was too few remains of the original stone pinnacle. Since the pinnacle design was considered only based upon estimation, Van Erp finally decided to dismantled the chattra pinnacle, now displayed in this museum.

=== Archaeological findings ===
Some statues taken from Borobudur are also stored in this museum, such as fragments of Buddha statues. One of the famous exhibit is the "Unfinished Buddha", believed to be discovered in the main stupa during early restoration effort in early 20th century. However today this opinion is highly doubted, this unperfect Buddha statue was probably taken from elsewhere and the inner chamber of main stupa was more likely originally designed to be left empty to symbolize the ultimate concept of Śūnyatā (nothingness).

Some of archaeological relics found in and around Borobudur are also displayed in this museum. Terracotta water vessels, containers, jars and also other relics were discovered around Borobudur during restoration projects. Other important exhibit also the 9th century large Buddha head, discovered in Selomerto, Wonosobo Regency, Central Java.

=== Borobudur restoration ===
The museum displays the history and documentations of Borobudur restoration project led by UNESCO between 1975 and 1982. Old photographs, maps and the model of interlocking Borobudur stones and structures are on display. The exhibit was meant to educate visitors about the problems and challenge on preserving Borobudur; such as structure integration, fungal, moss and decaying problems affecting Borobudur stones and bas reliefs, and also drainage problems. The modern technique applied on Borobudur restoration is also displayed, such as concrete supporting structure underneath Borobudur stones, lead covered stones, modern drainage system, etc.

== Gallery ==
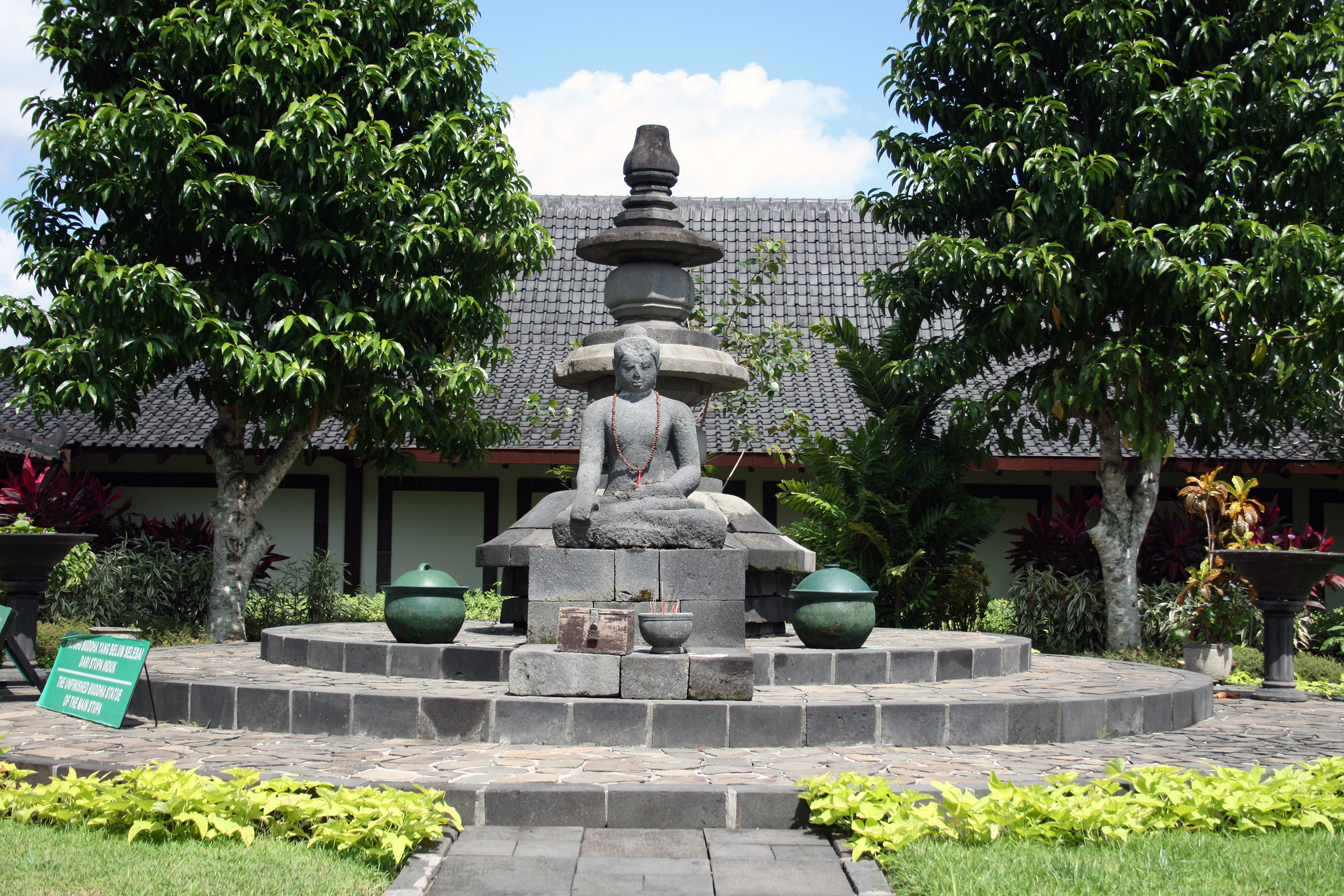
The Unfinished Buddha from the main stupa of Borobudur at Karmawibhangga Museum. On its back is chhatra (three-tiered parasol) which was dismantled from the top of Borobudur's main stupa because of frequent lightning stroke.

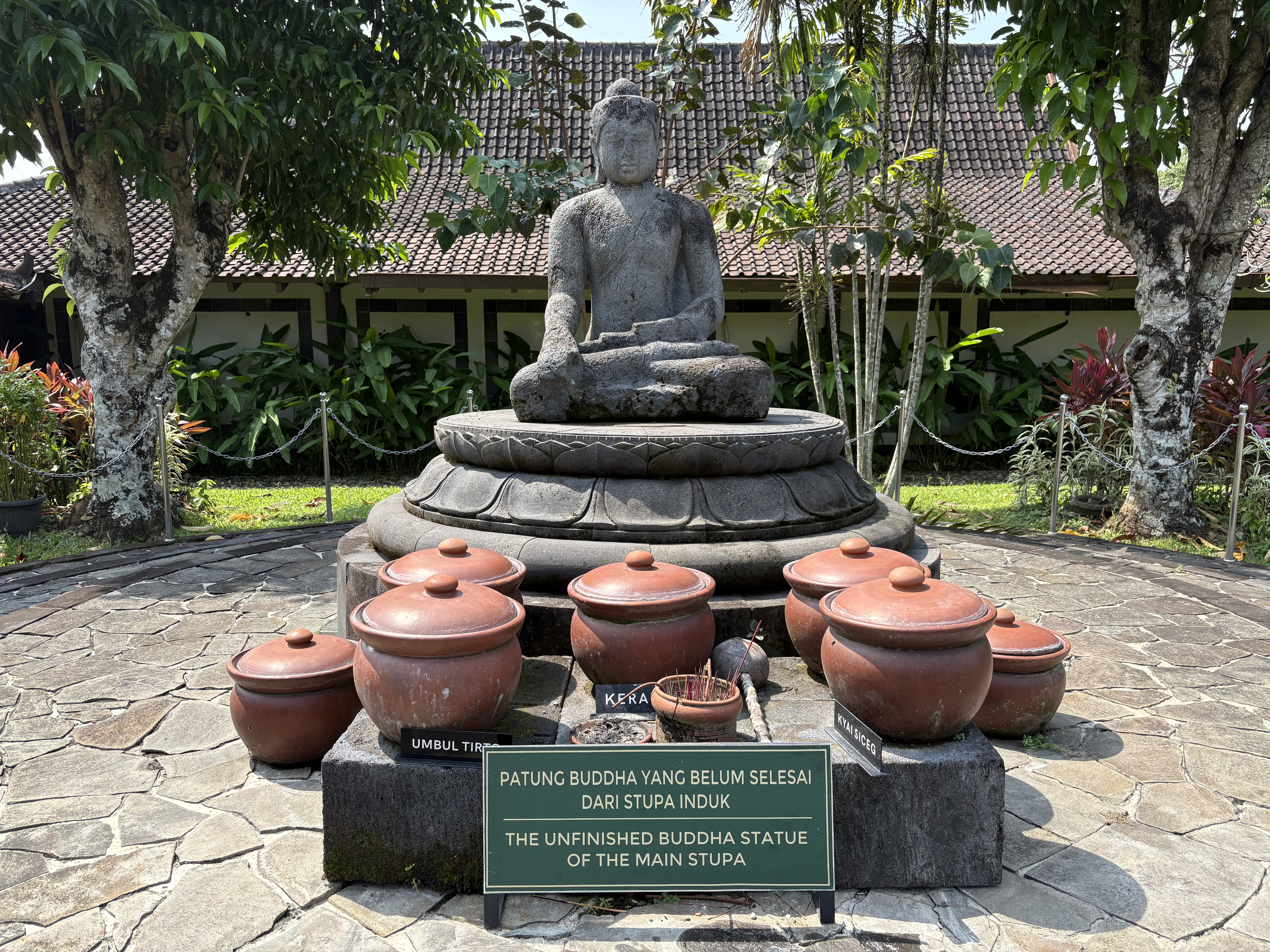
The Unfinished Buddha's display as of 2025; the chhatra was relocated elsewhere.

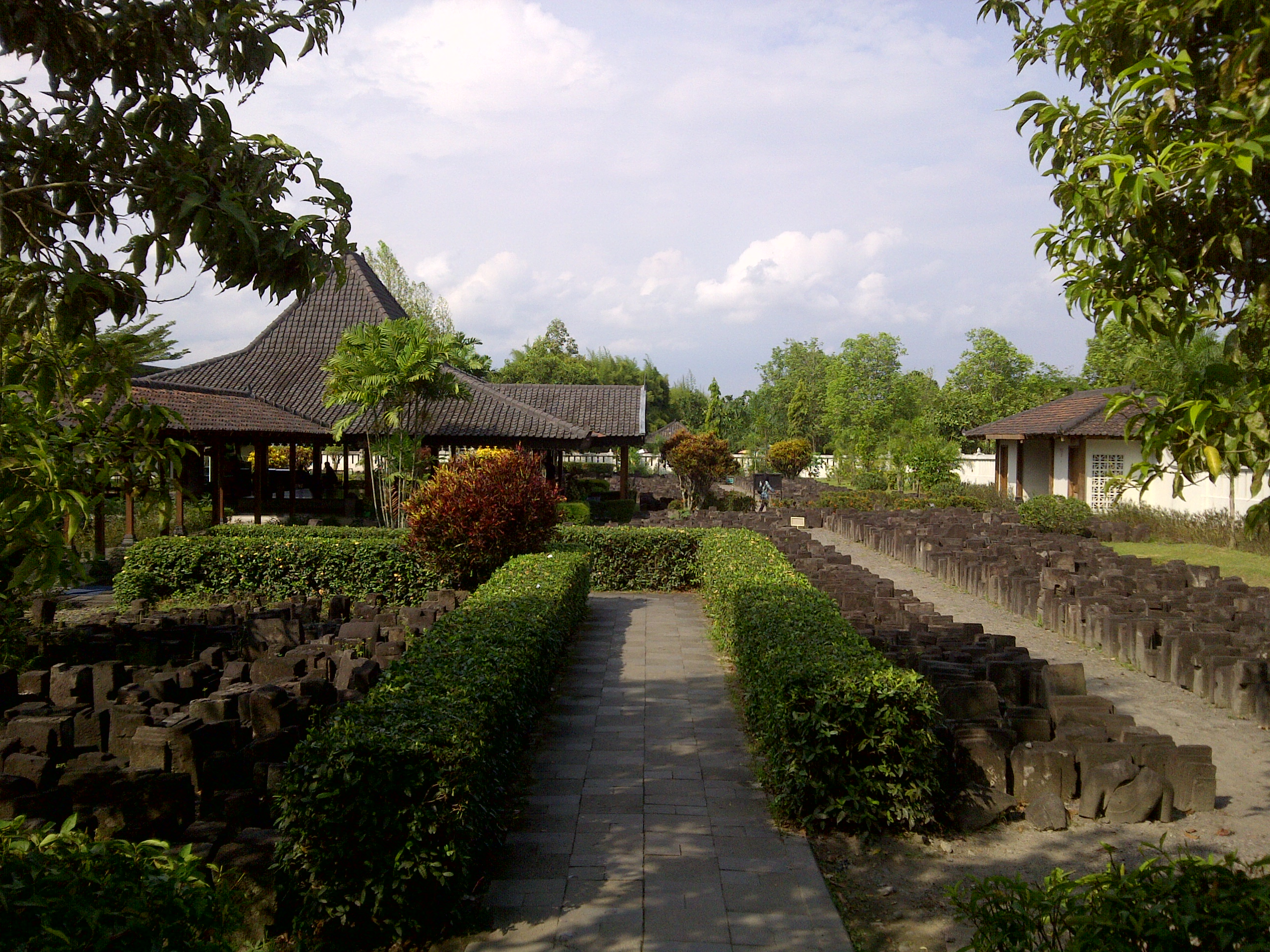
The scattered balustrade parts of Borobudur Temple at Karmawibhangga Museum. People still can't located its original position.

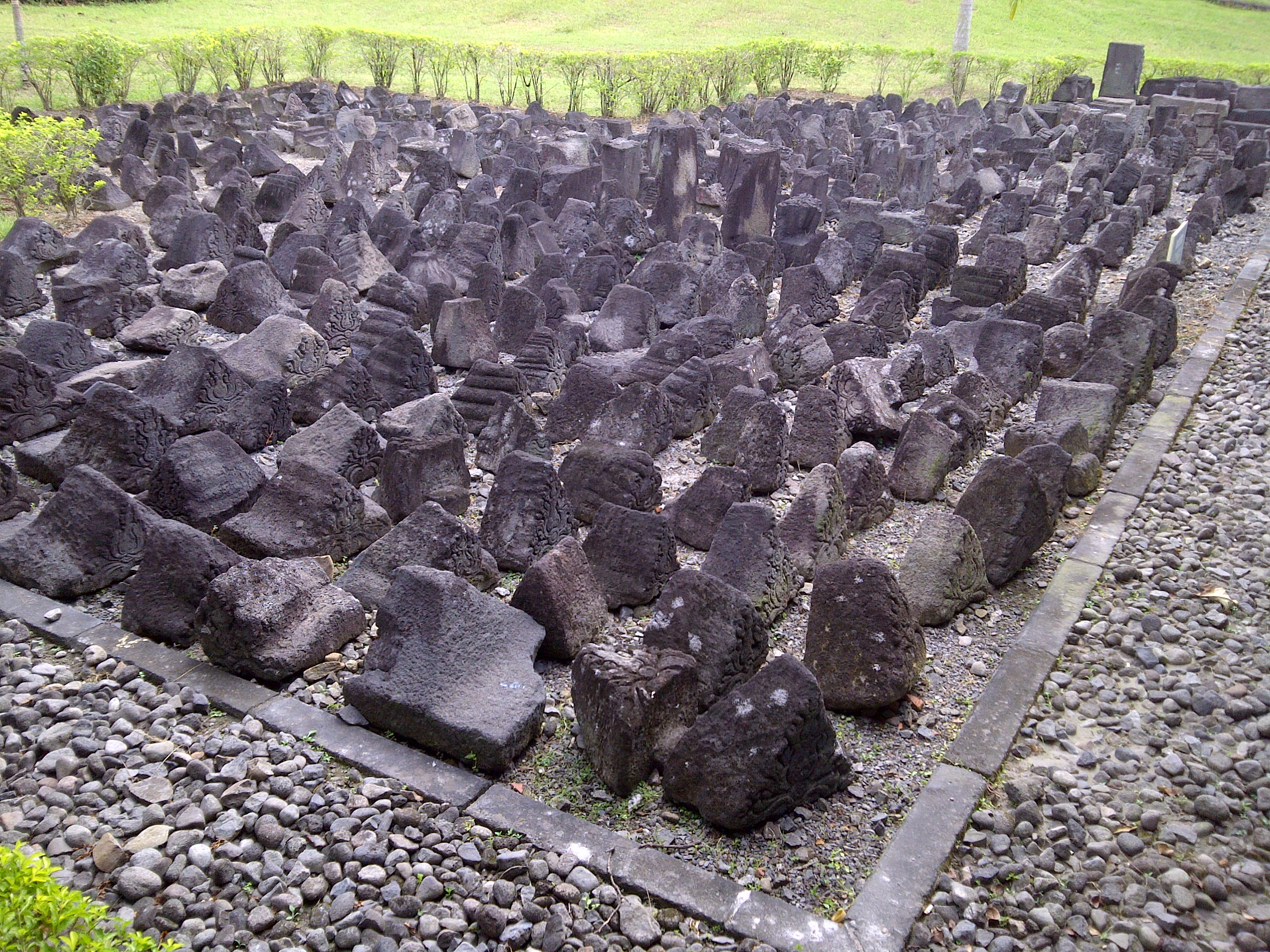
The scattered antefix parts of Borobudur Temple at Karmawibhangga Museum. People still can't locate its original position.
