= Parisā =

In Theravāda Buddhism, parisā (Pali for "assembly") or catuparisā (Pali for "fourfold assembly") refers to the wider Buddhist community of monks, nuns, laymen (upāsaka), and laywomen (upāsikā) who have taken refuge in the Three Jewels. The term is distinct from the word "sangha" which refers only to ordained monastics, but with reference to several specific contexts in the Pali Tripitaka which also uses the word "sangha" to refer to laymen and laywomen who have attained the four stages of awakening (ariya).
