= Sangha =

Pali and Sanskrit word meaning religious community

Translations of Saṃgha
- Sanskrit: संघ (IAST: saṃgha)
- Pali: saṅgha (Dev: सङ्घ)
- Bengali: সংঘ
- Burmese: သံဃာ (MLCTS: θàɰ̃ɡà)
- Chinese: 僧伽 (Pinyin: sēngjiā)
- Japanese: 僧 (Rōmaji: sō)
- Khmer: (ព្រះ)សង្ឃ (UNGEGN: (preah) sang)
- Korean: 승가 僧伽 (RR: seungga)
- Sinhala: සංඝයා
- Tagalog: sángga ᜐᜅ᜕ᜄ
- Tamil: சங்கம்
- Tibetan: དགེ་འདུན་ (dge 'dun)
- Thai: (พระ)สงฆ์ (RTGS: (phra)song)
- Vietnamese: Tăng đoàn Tăng già Giáo hội 僧團 僧伽 教會

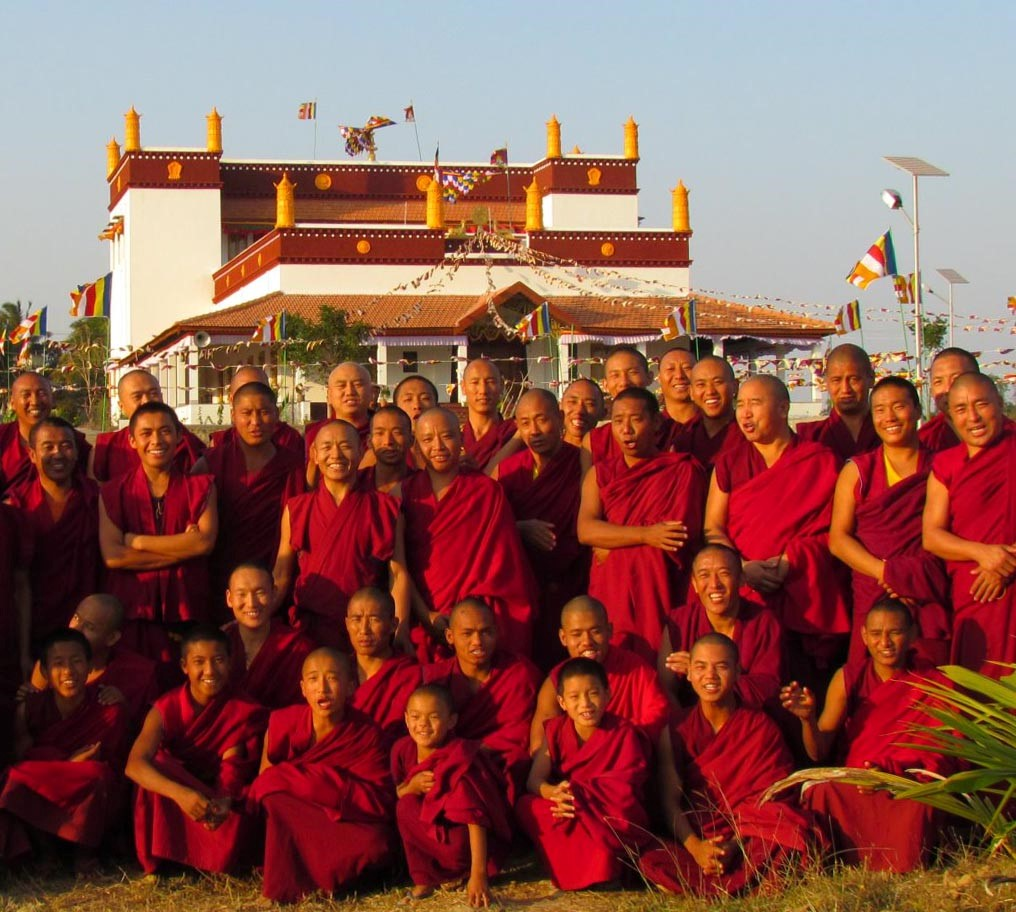
Monks, Tibetan Buddhist monastery, Rato Dratsang, India, January 2015

Saṅgha or saṃgha (IPA: [sɐŋɡʱɐ]) is a term meaning "association", "assembly", "company" or "community". In a political context, it was historically used to denote a governing assembly in a republic or a kingdom, and for a long time, it has been used by religious associations, including Buddhists, Jains, Hindus and Sikhs. Given this history, some Buddhists have stated that the tradition of the sangha represents humanity's oldest surviving democratic institution.

In Buddhism, sangha refers to the monastic communities of bhikkhu (monks) and bhikkhuni (nuns). These communities are traditionally referred to as the bhikkhu-sangha or the bhikkhuni-sangha. As a separate category, those Buddhists who have attained any of the four stages of enlightenment, whether or not they are members of the monastic community, are referred to as the āryasaṅgha ("noble Sangha").

According to the Theravada school and Nichiren Shoshu Buddhism,^{(needs a source)} the term sangha does not refer to the community of unenlightened sāvakas (lay followers) nor does it refer to the community of Buddhists as a whole. Presumably, therefore, they reserve the use of the term sangha for individuals they regard as being enlightened. The Theravada school uses the term parisā ("assembly") or catuparisā ("fourfold assembly") to refer to the bhikkhu, bhikkhunī, upāsaka, and upāsikā as a collective.

== Definitions ==
In a glossary of Buddhist terms, Richard Robinson et al. define sangha as:

Sangha. Community. This word has two levels of meaning:

(1) on the ideal (arya) level, it denotes all of the Buddha’s followers, lay or ordained, who have at least attained the level of srotāpanna;

(2) on the conventional (saṃvṛti) level, it denotes the orders of the Bhikṣus and Bhikṣunis.

Mahayana practitioners may use the word "sangha" as a collective term for all Buddhists, but the Theravada Pāli Canon uses the word parisā (Sanskrit pariṣad) for the larger Buddhist community—the monks, nuns, lay men, and lay women who have taken the Three Refuges—with a few exceptions reserving "sangha" for its original use in the Pāli Canon—the ideal (arya) and the conventional.

The two meanings overlap but are not necessarily identical. Some members of the ideal Sangha are not ordained; some monastics have yet to acquire the Dharma-eye.

Unlike the present Sangha, the original Sangha viewed itself as following the mission laid down by the Master, viz, to go forth "…on tour for the blessing of the manyfolk, for the happiness of the manyfolk out of compassion for the world, for the welfare, the blessing, the happiness of deva and men".

== Qualities of the Sangha ==
The Sangha is the third of the Three Refuges in Buddhism. Common over all schools is that the āryasaṅgha is the foremost form of this third jewel. As for its recognizable contemporary forms, the interpretation of what is the Jewel is often dependent on how a school defines Sangha. In many schools, for example, monastic life is considered to provide the safest and most suitable environment for advancing toward enlightenment and liberation due to the temptations and vicissitudes of life in the world.

In Buddhism, Gautama Buddha, the Dharma and the Sangha each are described as having certain characteristics. These characteristics are chanted either on a daily basis and/or on Uposatha days, depending on the school of Buddhism. In Theravada tradition they are a part of daily chanting:

The Sangha: The Sangha of the Blessed One's disciples (sāvakas) is:

1. practicing the good way (Suppaṭipanno)
2. practicing the upright way (Ujuppaṭipanno)
3. practicing the knowledgeable or logical way (Ñāyappaṭipanno)
4. practicing the proper way (Sāmīcippaṭipanno)

That is, the four pairs of persons, the eight types of individuals - This Sangha of the Blessed One's disciples is:

1. worthy of gifts (Āhuneyyo)
2. worthy of hospitality (Pāhuneyyo)
3. worthy of offerings (Dakkhiṇeyyo)
4. worthy of reverential salutation (Añjalikaraṇīyo)
5. the unsurpassed field of merit for the world (Anuttaraṃ puññakkhettaṃ lokassa).

== Monastic tradition ==
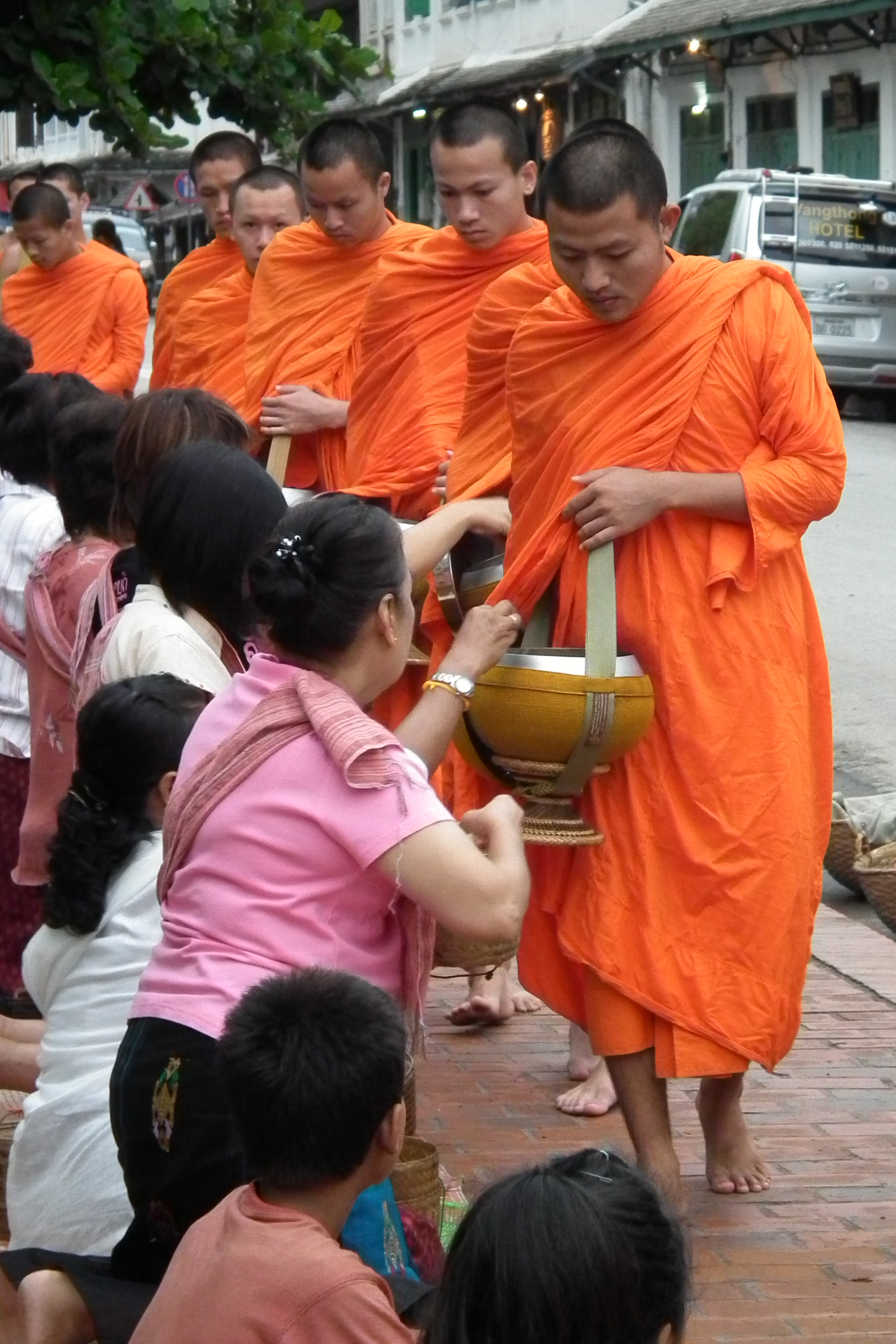
Sangha, Luang Prabang, Laos

The Sangha was originally established by Gautama Buddha in the fifth century BCE in order to provide a means for those who wish to practice full-time in a direct and highly disciplined way, free from the restrictions and responsibilities of the household life. The Sangha also fulfils the function of preserving the Buddha's original teachings and of providing spiritual support for the Buddhist lay-community. The Sangha has historically assumed responsibility for maintaining the integrity of the doctrine as well as the translation and propagation of the teachings of the Buddha.

The key feature of Buddhist monasticism is the adherence to the vinaya which contains an elaborate set of "227 main rules of conduct" (known as Patimokkha in Pāli) including complete chastity, eating only before noon, and not indulging in malicious or salacious talk. Between midday and the next day, a strict life of scripture study, chanting, meditation, and occasional cleaning forms most of the duties for members of the sangha. Transgression of rules carries penalties ranging from confession to permanent expulsion from the sangha.

=== Japanese monastic regulations ===
Saichō, the founder of the Japanese school of Tendai, decided to reduce the number of rules down to about 60 based on the Bodhisattva Precepts. In the Kamakura, many Japanese schools that originated in or were influenced by the Tendai such as Zen, Pure Land Buddhism and Nichiren Buddhism abolished traditional ordination in favor of this new model of the monastic regulations.

=== The Fourteen Precepts of the Order of Interbeing ===
The Order of Interbeing, established in 1964 and associated with the Plum Village Tradition, has fourteen precepts observed by all monastics. They were written by Thích Nhất Hạnh.

=== Possessions ===
Monks and nuns generally own a minimum of possessions due to their samaya as renunciants, including three robes, an alms bowl, a cloth belt, a needle and thread, a razor for shaving the head, and a water filter. In practice, they often have a few additional personal possessions.

Traditionally, Buddhist monks, nuns, and novices eschew ordinary clothes and wear robes. Originally the robes were sewn together from rags and stained with earth or other available dyes. The color of modern robes varies from community to community: saffron is characteristic for Theravada groups; blue, grey or brown for Mahayana Sangha members in Vietnam, maroon in Tibetan Buddhism, grey in Korea, and black in Japan.

=== Attitudes regarding food and work ===
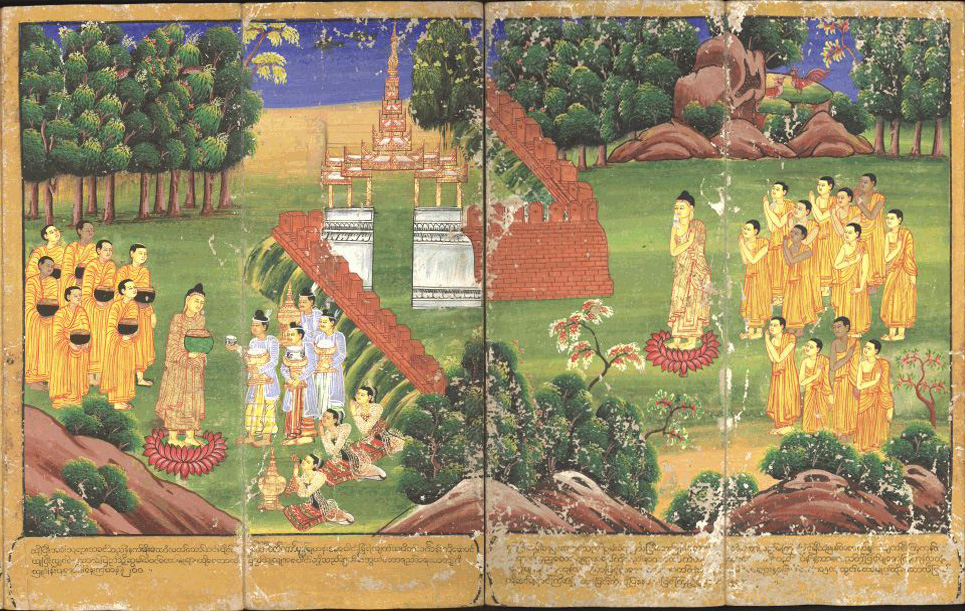
Shakyamuni Buddha and his followers, holding begging bowls, receive offerings. An 18th-century Burmese watercolor.

A Buddhist monk is a bhikkhu in Pali, Sanskrit bhikṣu, while a nun is a bhikkhuni, Sanskrit bhikṣuṇī. These words literally mean "beggar" or "one who lives by alms", and it was traditional in early Buddhism for the Sangha to go on "alms round" for food, walking or standing quietly in populated areas with alms bowls ready to receive food offerings each day. Although in the vinaya laid down by the Gautama Buddha, the sangha was not allowed to engage directly in agriculture, this later changed in some Mahayana schools when Buddhism moved to East Asia, so that in the East Asian cultural sphere, the monastic community traditionally has engaged in agriculture. An emphasis on working for food is attributed to additional training guidelines laid down by a Chan Buddhist master, Baizhang Huaihai, notably the phrase, "A day without work is a day without food" (Chinese: 一日不做一日不食).

The idea that all Buddhists, especially sangha members, practice vegetarianism is a Western misperception. In the Pali Canon, the Buddha rejected a suggestion by Devadatta to impose vegetarianism on the sangha. According to the Pali Texts, the Buddha ate meat as long as the animal was not killed specifically for him. The Pāli Canon allowed Sangha members to eat whatever food is donated to them by laypeople, except that they may not eat meat if they know or suspect the animal was killed specifically for them. Consequently, the Theravada tradition does not practice strict vegetarianism, although an individual may do so as his or her personal choice.

Both Mahayana and Vajrayana traditions vary depending on their interpretation of their scriptures. In some Mahayana sutras, meat-eating is strongly discouraged and it is stated that the Buddha did not eat meat. In particular, East Asian sangha members take on the Bodhisattva Precepts originating in the Brahmajāla Sūtra, which has a vow of vegetarianism as part of the Triple Platform Ordination, where they receive the three sets of vows: śrāmaṇera/śrāmaṇerī (novitiate), monastic, and then the Brahmajāla Sūtra Bodhisattva Precepts, whereas the Tibetan lineages transmit a tradition of Bodhisattva Precepts from Asanga's Yogācārabhūmi-Śāstra, which do not include a vow of vegetarianism.

According to Mahayana sutras, Shakyamuni Buddha always maintained that lay persons were capable of great wisdom and of reaching enlightenment. In some areas there has been a misconception that Theravada regards enlightenment to be an impossible goal for those outside the sangha, but in Theravada suttas it is clearly recorded that the Buddha's uncle, a lay follower, reached enlightenment by hearing the Buddha's discourse, and there are many other such instances described in the Pāli Canon. Accordingly, emphasis on lay persons, as well as Sangha members, practicing the Buddhist path of morality, meditation, and wisdom is present in all major Buddhist schools.

== The Sangha as any Buddhist community ==
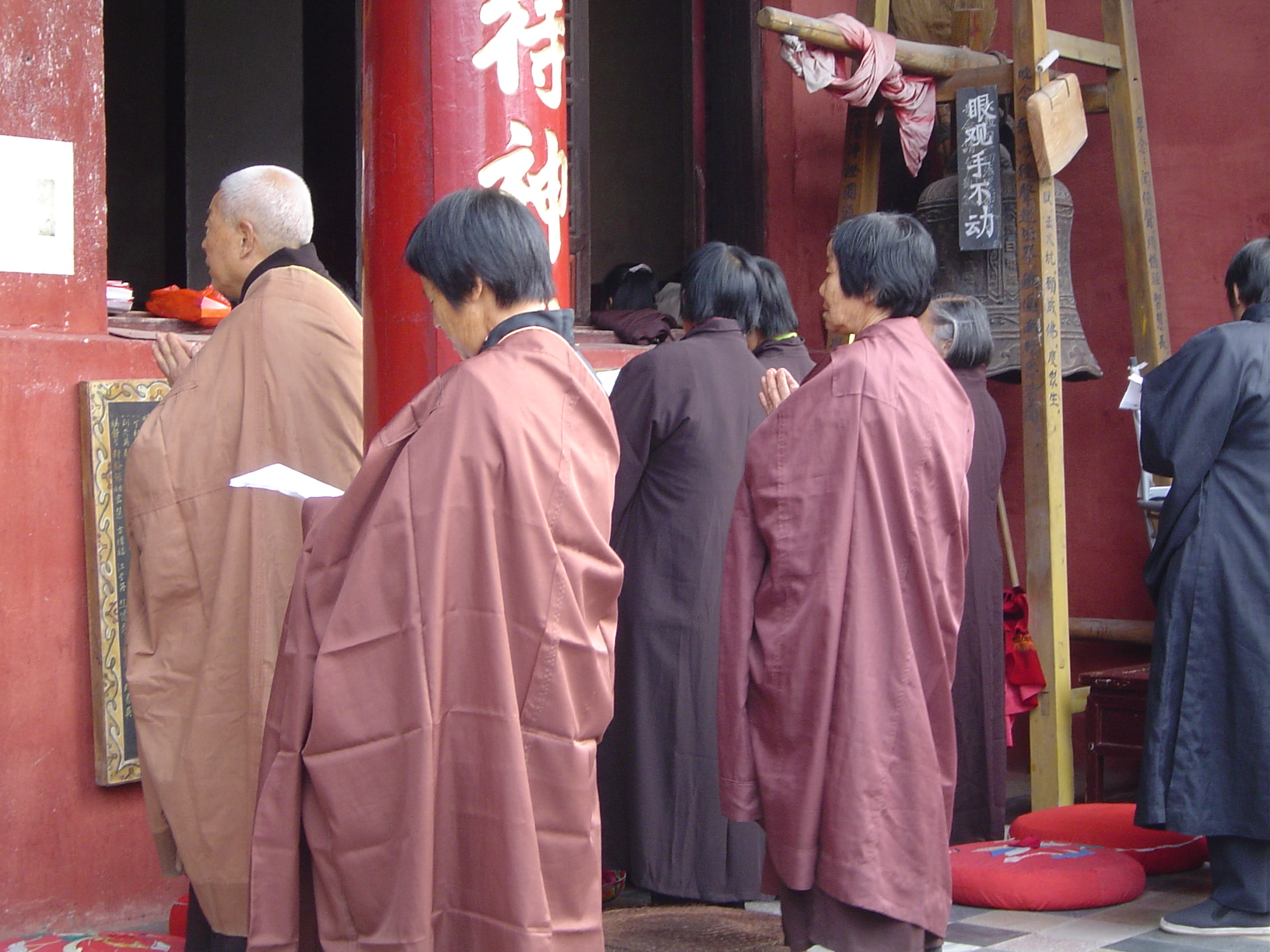
Upāsakas and Upāsikās performing a short chanting ceremony at Three Ancestors Temple, Anhui, China

Some liberal scholars opine that sangha is frequently (and according to them, mistakenly) used in the West to refer to any sort of Buddhist community.

- The terms Parisā and Gaṇa are suggested as being more appropriate references to a wider and generalized community of Buddhists. Pariṣā means "following" and it refers to the four groups of the Buddha's followers: monks, nuns, laymen and laywomen.
- The Sanskrit term gana has meanings of "flock, troop, multitude, number, tribe, series, class", and is usable as well in more mundane senses.

== In Nichiren Buddhism ==
Accordingly, the Nichiren Shōshū sect maintains the traditionalist definition of the sangha as the Head Temple Taisekiji priesthood collective as the sole custodians and arbiters of Buddhist doctrine.

The Soka Gakkai, a new religious movement which began as a lay organization previously associated with Nichiren Shōshū in Japan, disputes the traditional definition of sangha. The organization interprets the meaning of the Three Jewels of Buddhism, in particular the "treasure of the Sangha", to include all people who practice Buddhism according to its own interpretation within their organization, whether lay or clerical. After its formal expulsion from its parent religion in December 1991 due to conflicts of religious doctrine, the organization re—published newer literature which revised the terms such as "Treasure of the Priesthood" to "The Buddhist Order".

Some modernist sects of Nichiren-shu holds a position that any Buddhist community is also called Sangha, along with both liberal and progressive Mahayana lay movements as well claiming this new definition.

== See also ==
- Bhikkhu
- Bhikkhuni
- Buddhamitra
- Buddhism and democracy
- Buddhist monasticism
- Monastery
- Monastic
- Monasticism
- Ngagpa
- Pabbajja
- Sanga Monastery
- Sangha (Jainism)
- Satsang
- Upasampada
- World Buddhist Sangha Council

== Bibliography ==
- Buswell, Robert E., ed. (2004). Encyclopedia of Buddhism. Macmillan Reference USA. pp. 740–744. ISBN 0-02-865718-7.
