= Buddhist holidays =

This is a list of holidays and festivals celebrated within the Buddhist tradition.

== Holidays Of Buddhism ==
- Vesak: The Buddha's birthday is known as Vesak and is one of the major festivals of the year. It is celebrated on the first moon day in May, or the fourth lunar month which usually occurs in May or during a lunar leap year, June. In some countries this has become an occasion to not only celebrate the birth but also the enlightenment and parinirvana of the Buddha.
- Parinirvana Day: also known as Nirvana Day, a Mahayana Buddhist holiday celebrated in East Asia, Vietnam and the Philippines usually on February 15.
- Magha Puja: Magha Puja is an important religious festival celebrated by Buddhists in Thailand, Cambodia, Sri Lanka and Laos on the full moon day of the third lunar month (this usually falls in February or March)
- Buddha Jayanti: In South Korea, the Philippines, Vietnam and China, it is celebrated in April 8 in Lunar calendar. Also known as "Hanamatsuri", it is celebrated April 8. In Japan, baby Buddha figurines are ceremonially washed with tea.
- Asalha Puja Day: Also known as "Dharma Day" celebrates the Buddha's first teaching on the full moon day of the 8th lunar month, approximately July.
- Uposatha: This day is known as observance day, there are four holy days on the new moon, full moon, and quarter moon days every month.
- Kathina Ceremony: This robe offering ceremony, is held on any date within the end of the Vassa Retreat. New robes and other requisites can be offered by the laity to the monks.
- Abhidhamma Day: According to Burmese tradition, this day celebrates when the Buddha went to the Tushita Heaven to teach his mother the Abhidhamma. It is celebrated on the full moon of the seventh month the Burmese lunar year which starts in April.
- Loy Krathong: When the rivers and canals are full of water, this festival takes place in all parts of Thailand on the full moon night of the twelfth lunar month. Bowls made with leaves, candles, and incense sticks, are in the water, and represent bad luck disappearing.
- Madhu Purnima: It occurs on the day of the full moon in Bhadro (August/September). The day commemorates an occasion on which the Buddha retreated to the wilderness of Parileyya forest to bring peace between two quarrelling factions of disciples.
- The Ploughing Festival: During the half moon in May, two oxen pull a plough painted gold. Following behind them are girls dressed in white scattering rice seeds. This was to celebrate the Buddha's first moment of enlightenment.
- The Elephant Festival: The Buddha used an example of a wild elephant which is harnessed to a tame one to be trained. He said that a person who is new to Buddhism should have a special relationship with an older Buddhist. This festival takes place on the third Saturday in November.
- The Festival of the Tooth: In Sri Lanka there is a temple that houses a tooth relic of the Buddha. It can't be seen, but once a year there is a procession for it on the full moon in August.
- Hungry Ghost Festival: "Ancestor Day" or "Ulambana" is celebrated from the first to the fifteenth days of the eighth lunar month. This is the day when the monastics complete their Rains Retreat. It was considered that many monastics would have made progress during their retreat and therefore become a greater field of merit. Lay devotees make offerings on behalf of their ancestors and dedicate the merit towards those suffering in the preta realm to relieve their suffering.
- Avalokitesvara's Birthday: This festival celebrates the Bodhisattva ideal. On the full moon day in March, it represents the perfection of compassion in Mahayana traditions of Tibet, China, Vietnam and the Philippines.
- Bodhi Day: The holiday which commemorates the day that the historical Buddha experienced enlightenment.

== Festivals ==
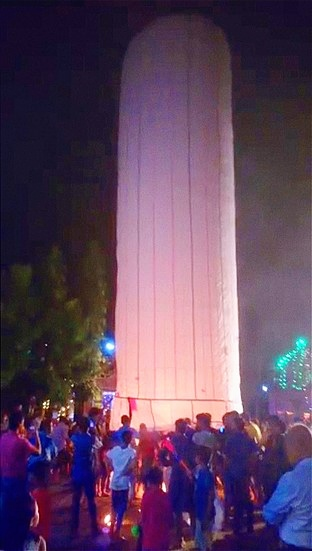
Buddhists fly lanterns during the Pavāraṇā ceremony in Bandarban, Bangladesh

Chinese, Korean, Japanese, Vietnamese, Burmese, Khmer, Tibetan, Indian, Nepalese, Bhutanese, Chakma, Marma and Barua festivals often show the influence of Buddhist culture. Pagoda festivals in Myanmar are one example. In Tibet, India and Bhutan these festivals may include the traditional cham dance.

Lunar New Year festivals of Buddhist countries in east, south and southeast Asia also include some aspects of Buddhist culture, but they are considered cultural festivals as opposed to religious ones.

=== A ===
- Ambedkar Jayanti
- Aluth Sahal Mangallaya
- Asalha Puja (or Dharma Day)

=== B ===
- Barua festivals
- Bhumchu
- Bodhi Day
- Bon Festival
- Bon Om Touk
- Boun Suang Huea
- Buddha's Birthday
- Bunga Dyah Jatra

=== C ===
- Chak phra
- Cheung Chau Bun Festival
- Chotrul Duchen
- Choul Chnam Thmey

=== D ===
- Dhammachakra Pravartan Din
- Diwali
- Dongzhi Festival
- Deezezazu

=== F ===
- Festival of Floral Offerings

=== G ===
- Ghost Festival
- Gozan no Okuribi
- Gunla
- Gunla Bajan
- Guru Purnima

=== H ===
- Hari-Kuyo
- Hungry ghost

=== J ===
- Jana Baha Dyah Jatra

=== K ===
- Kagyed
- Kandy Esala Perahera
- Kathina
- Kräutergarten

=== L ===
- Lhabab Duchen
- Loi Krathong

=== M ===
- Madhu Purnima
- Magha Puja
- Mohani
- Monlam Prayer Festival

=== O ===
- Ōmisoka

=== P ===
- Pagoda festival
- Parinirvana Day
- Pavāraṇā
- Phi Ta Khon
- Poy Sang Long
- Poson

=== R ===
- Rocket Festival

=== S ===
- Sambuddhatva jayanthi
- Samyak
- Sanghamitta
- Sangrai (New year Water Festival Celebrated by Marma and Rakhine People in Bangladesh)
- Sanja Matsuri
- Setsubun
- Shuilu Fahui
- Songkran
- Songkran (Lao)
- Songkran (Thailand)
- Swanti (festival)

=== T ===
- Tak Bat Thewo
- Tango no sekku
- Tazaungdaing festival
- Tết
- Thadingyut Festival
- Thingyan
- Tibetan festivals
- Torgya
- Tshechu

=== U ===
- Ubon Ratchathani Candle Festival
- Uposatha

=== V ===
- Vassa
- Vesak

=== W ===
- Wacho (Start of Rain Retreat by Marma People and Rakhine People)
- Wan Ok Phansa
- Wagyowai (End of Rain Retreat by Marma People and Rakhine People)
- Water-Sprinkling Festival

=== Y ===
- Yenya
- Yeongsanjae

== See also ==
- Buddhist calendar
- Culture of Buddhism
- Religious festival
