= Esala =

Esala may refer to:

== Events ==
- Esala Puja, also known as Dharma Day, one of Theravada Buddhism's most important festivals.
- Kandy Esala Perahera, Sri Lankan festival.
- Esala Mangallaya, Sri Lankan festival.

== Places ==
- Edinburgh School of Architecture and Landscape Architecture, Edinburgh, Scotland, United Kingdom.
- A village in Rivers State, Nigeria.

== People ==
- Esala Masi, Fijian footballer.
- Esala Weerakoon, Sri Lankan diplomat.
- Esala Teleni, Fijian naval officer.
- Dairo Esalas, Colombian boxer.
