= Phuang malai =

Thai floral garland

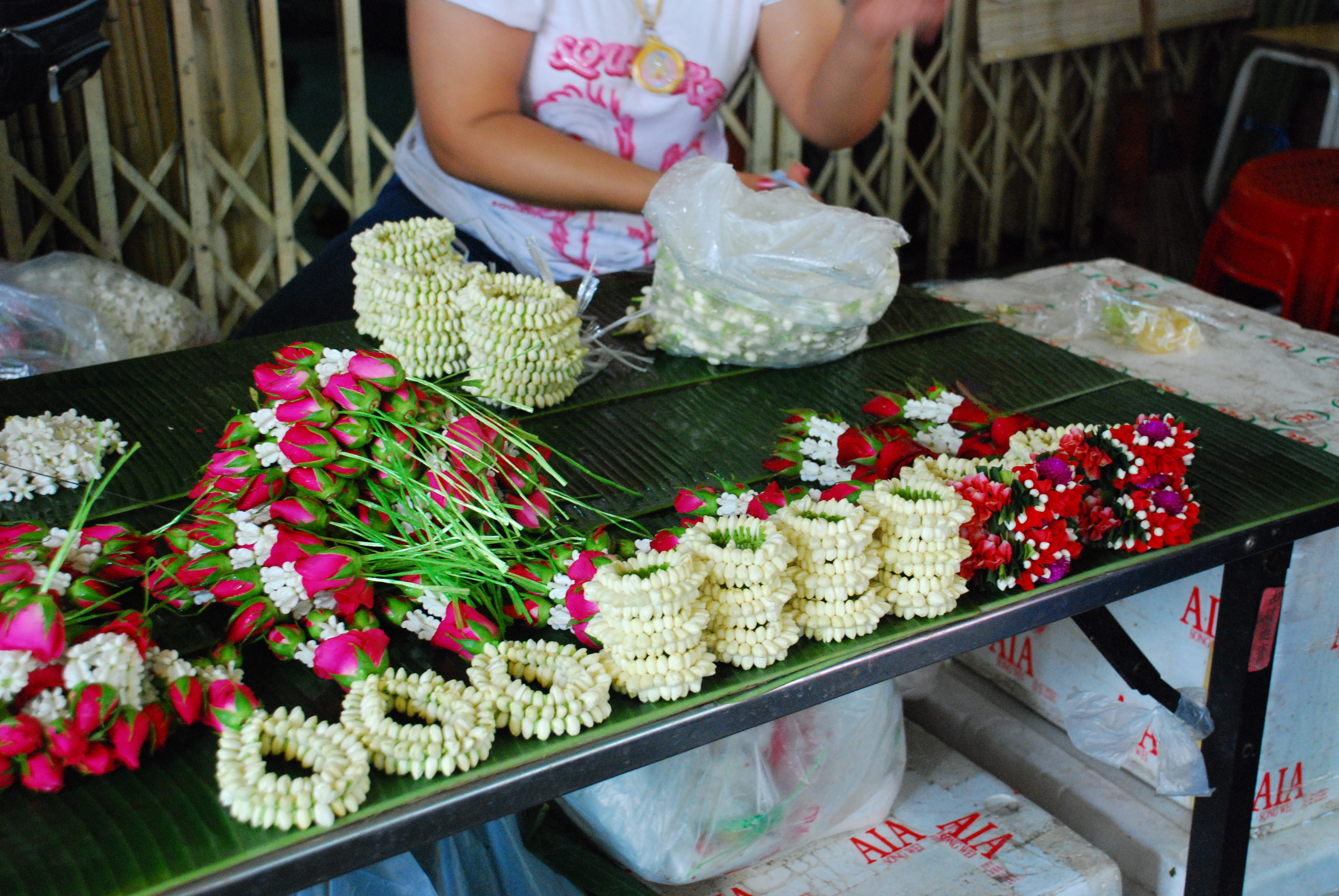
Phuang malai at various stages of completion

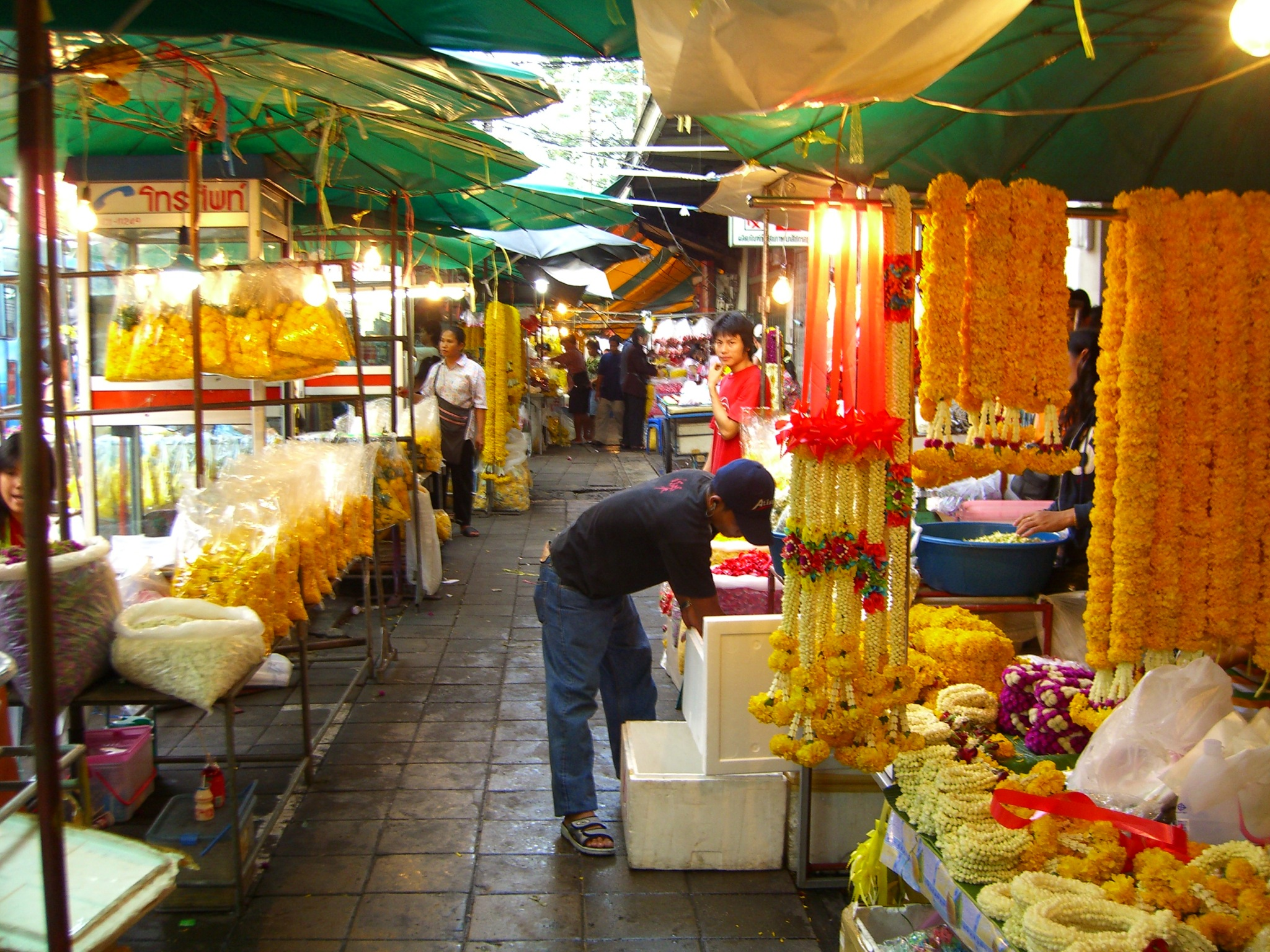
Stalls in Pak Khlong Talat with phuang malai for sale

Phuang malai (Thai: พวงมาลัย, pronounced [pʰūaŋ māːlāj]) or malai (มาลัย, [māːlāj]) are a Thai form of floral garland. They are often given as offerings or kept for good luck.

== Origins ==
Phuang malai may be derived from the Tamil term “poo maalai” which has the same meaning. It is a combination of two Tamil terms: “poo” (flowers) and “maalai” (garland). There is historical evidence that the Chola kings from Tamil Nadu (South India) had captured parts of what is currently Thailand, Java and Sumatra, Indonesia, and Sri Lanka. Rock inscriptions mention these victories. In general, the Tamil people are skillful garland makers and celebrate every special life event with flowers and garlands- from birth to death. Chola kings were known for patronising temples in Tamil Nadu and abroad and, in doing so, disseminated these traditions. Because of their strong presence in Thailand, the Cholas came to be known as “Chulalongarn” in Thai.

The first record of phuang malai was found during the reign of King Chulalongkorn. There was a literary work written by the king called Phra Ratchaphithi Sip Song Duean ('Twelve-Months Royal Ceremonies') which contained information about events and ceremonies in the Sukhothai Kingdom. In the 4th month ceremony, it was mentioned that fresh flower garlands were made by the king's chief concubine Thao Sichulalak (ท้าวศรีจุฬาลักษณ์). Then, in the Rattanakosin Kingdom the phuang malai became an important ornamental object in every ceremony. Every girl in the palace was expected to acquire the skills of making phuang malai. Queen Saovabha Phongsri devised a wide variety of intricate phuang malai patterns.

== Patterns ==
Phuang malai patterns can be divided into six groups.

1. Creature malai resembles animals. Flowers are arranged into animal shapes such as mouse, rabbit, squirrel, and gibbon.
2. Chained malai is a series of rounded malai connected together which resemble a chain.
3. Braided malai two rounded malai connected together, decorated with pine-shaped malai on each end.
4. Vine malai is a series of semicircular malai arranged in a vine shape.
5. Laced malai is a malai fully decorated by inserting golden and silver laces all over the malai both inside and out.
6. Orchid malai is made only from orchids.

== Uses ==
Phuang malai can be classified into three categories by use.

1. Malai chai diao (มาลัยชายเดียว, [māːlāj t͡ɕʰāːj dīa̯w]) is usually used as an offering to show respect. In temples and cemeteries, these malai can be seen hanging from the hands of Buddhist monk statues along with votive candles. Chained malai and braided malai are examples of malai chai diao.
2. Malai song chai (มาลัยสองชาย, [māːlāj sɔ̌ːŋ t͡ɕʰāːj]) is usually draped around a person's neck to show importance. In the Thai wedding ceremony, both bride and groom often wear malai song chai.
3. Malai chamruai or souvenir malai (มาลัยชำร่วย, [māːlāj t͡ɕʰām.rûa̯j]), the smallest form of malai, is usually given as a souvenir to a large group of people. These malai are customarily given by a host, for instance, in wedding ceremonies, housewarming ceremonies, birthday parties, and baby showers. Creature malai is one form of malai chamruai. The purpose of malai chamruai is similar to that of lei (garland) in Hawaiian culture.

In addition to the use of the malai as offerings, gifts, and souvenirs, malai have many more functions. They can be used to decorate throne halls and houses. Malai can also be hung on Thai musical instruments to pay respect to the masters of those instruments and for good luck and success in a performance.

Malai are often put on vehicles to ensure protection from accidents.

=== Bamboo garlands ===
Thai bamboo garlands are decorative woven offerings sometimes used as a substitute for floral garlands and as a way to hang other offerings. Bamboo garlands are part of the tradition of Phu Thai people in the village of Kut Wa in Kuchinarai District, Kalasin Province, in the northeast of Thailand. Bamboo garlands are also used in the festival of Buddhist Lent during the Thai rainy season, called "Bun Khao Pradap Din" or "Bun Phuang Malai Ban Kut Wa".

==== Bamboo garland ceremony, Kut Wa, Thailand ====
To celebrate Phu Thai, the villagers of Kut Wa create ornate garlands and form a procession around Wat Kok to display their handiwork, with dancing, singing, and rhythmic drumming.

== See also ==
- Anussati
- Buddhist devotion
- Buddhist prayer beads
- Festival of Floral Offerings
- Garland & Lei
- Puja
- Vassa candle
- Wai
- Wai khru
