= Kaṭhina =

Theravāda Buddhist festival

Kathina
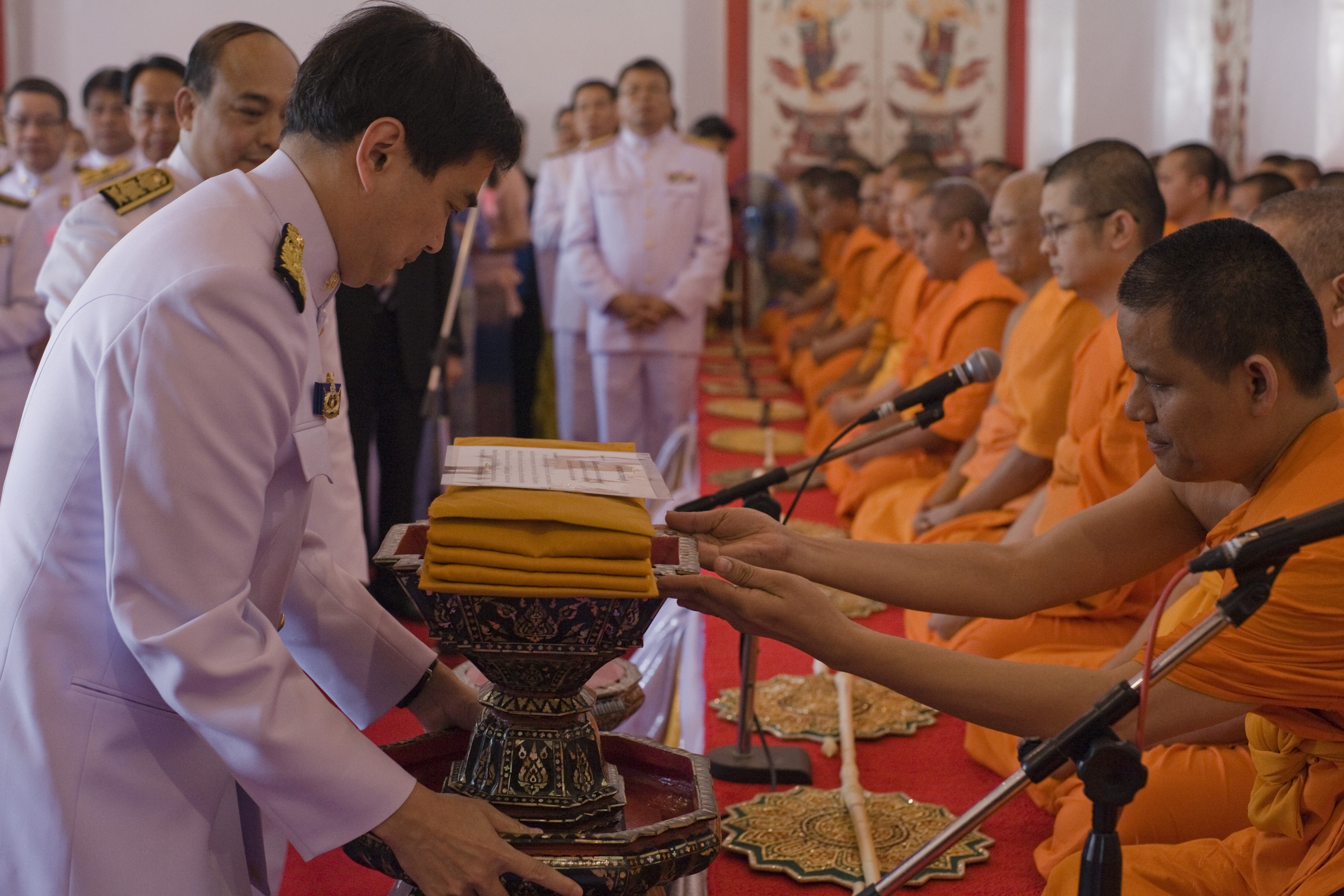
- Former Prime Minister Abhisit Vejjajiva of Thailand offers robes to monks in the 2010 Kathina.
- Also called: কঠিন চীবর্ দান্ Kaṭhina Cībar Dān; ကထိန် Kahtein; កឋិន Kâthĕn; กฐิน Kathin; ကထ့ၢ် Kuh-htay
- Observed by: Theravādin Buddhists
- Type: Buddhist
- Duration: 1 month
- Frequency: Annual
- Related to: Vassa

Kathina is a Buddhist festival which comes at the end of Vassa, the three-month rainy season retreat for Theravada Buddhists in Bangladesh (known as Kaṭhina Cībar Dān), Cambodia, Myanmar, Thailand, India, Sri Lanka, Vietnam, Laos, Malaysia, and Singapore. The season during which a monastery may hold Kathina is one month long, beginning after the full moon of the eleventh month in the Lunar calendar (usually October).

It is a time of giving, for the laity to express gratitude to bhikkhus (Buddhist monks). Lay followers bring donations to temples, especially new robes for the monks. The gift of the Eight Requisites (aṭṭha parikkhārā, or Atapirikara in Sri Lanka) is also part of the offerings.

== Origins ==
Kaṭhina (or Kaṭina) is a Pali word (from sanskrit word kasth) referring to the wooden frame used to measure the length and width by which the robes of Buddhist monks are cut. As the legend goes, thirty bhikkhus were journeying with the intention of spending Vassa with Gautama Buddha. However, the rains began before they reached their destination and they had to stop at Saketa (ancient name for the holy city of Ayodhya in India). According to Buddha's guidelines for Vassa, mendicant monks shouldn't travel during the rainy season as they may unintentionally harm crops and/or insects during their journey. As such, the monks had to stop.

The bhikkhus passed their time together without conflict and practising Dhamma so afterwards, the Buddha rewarded the monks by demonstrating a way to practice sharing and generosity. A lay disciple had previously donated pieces of cloth to the Buddha, so the Buddha now gave the pieces to the group of monks and told them to make it into a robe and then offer it as a gift to one of them. A frame, called a Kathina, was used to hold the pieces while they were being made into one robe.

Chaturmasya (Sanskrit: चातुर्मास्य, lit. 'Cāturmāsya'; Pali: Catumāsa), also rendered Chāturmāsa, is a similar holy period of four months in Hinduism, beginning on Shayani Ekadashi (June-July) and ending on Prabodhini Ekadashi (October-November). This period also coincides with the monsoon season in India.

== Practices ==
=== Malaysia ===
Kathina has been held in Malaysia since 2009, across many temples. Although 19.4% of those practising Buddhism in Malaysia are predominantly of the Mahayana tradition, a recent emergence of the Theravada tradition from Thailand in the North and Sri Lanka in the South has started the tradition of the observance of Vassa across Buddhist temples in Malaysia. Vassa is observed starting on the fifteenth day of the sixth month of the Chinese lunar calendar, and the choice of the date of the Kathina celebration, as well as the end of Vassa observance for each respective temple, can range from the first day of the ninth lunar month to the fifteenth day of the tenth lunar month.

=== Myanmar ===
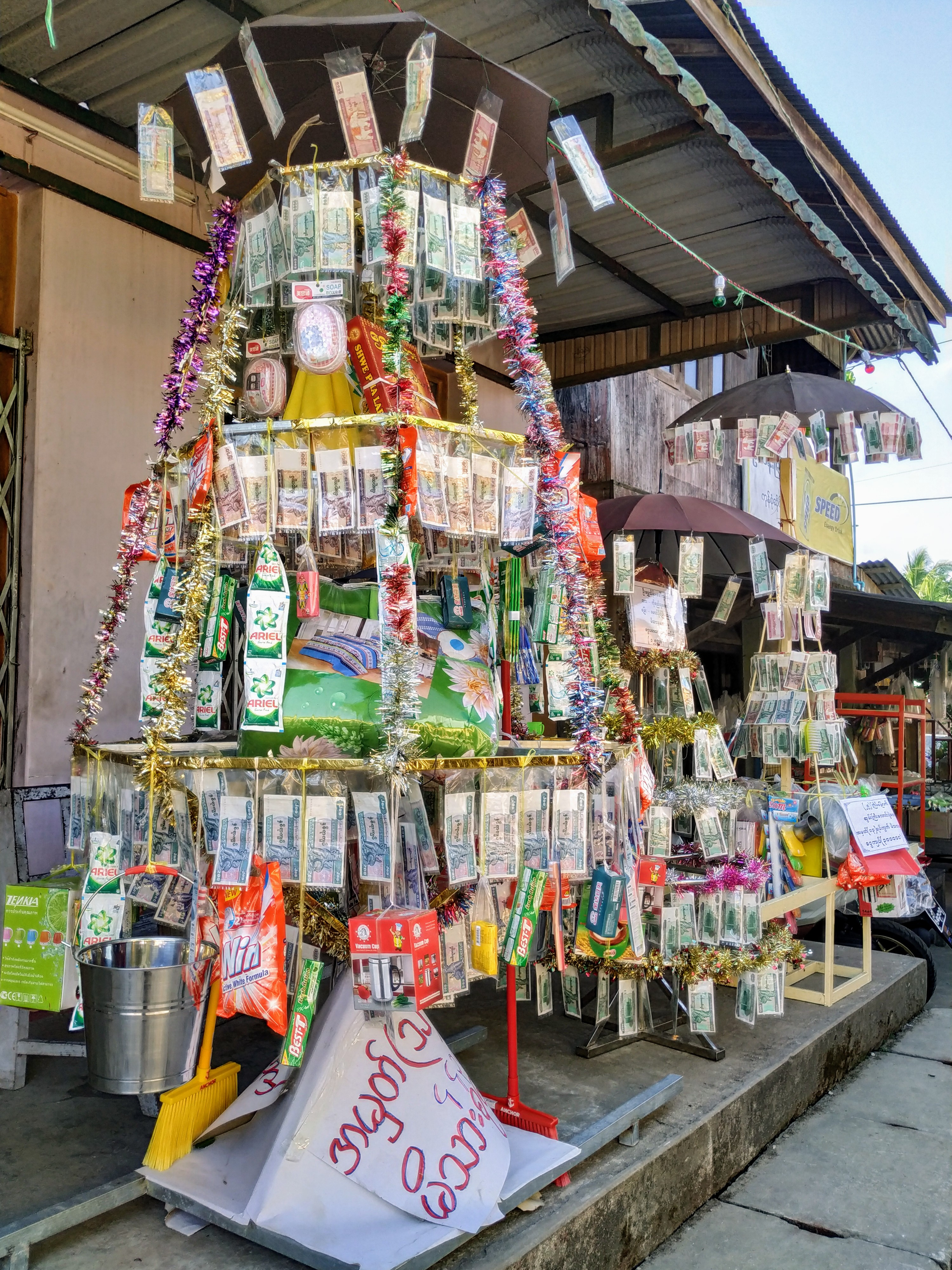
Kahtein trees from Myanmar

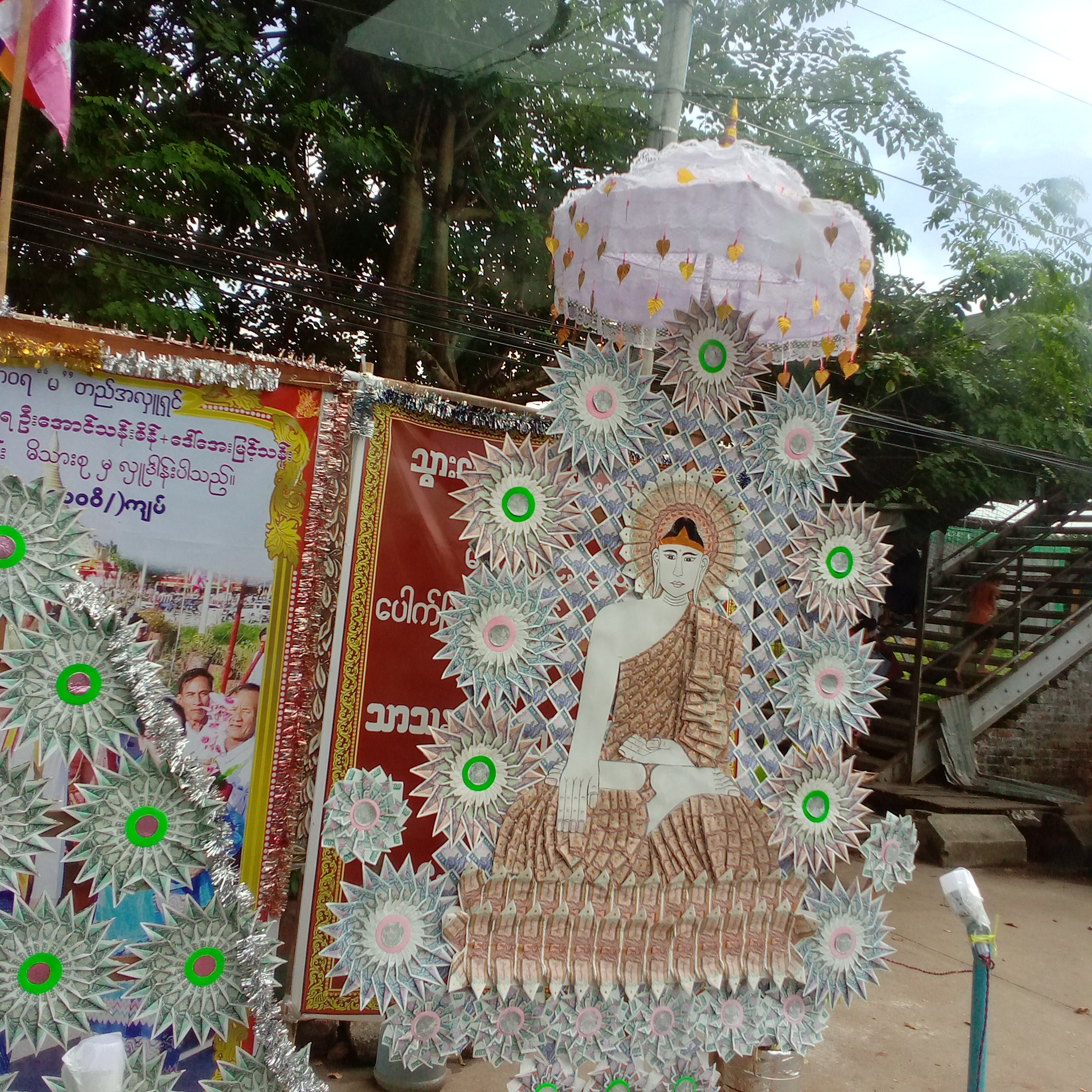
Kahtein tree portraying Buddha made out of money

Kathein (Burmese: ကထိန်, from Pali ကထိန) refers to the ceremony during which yellow robes called matho thingan (မသိုးသင်္ကန်း) are offered to the sangha between the first waning day of Thadingyut (သီတင်းကျွတ်, approximately October) and the full moon day of Tazaungmon (တန်ဆောင်မုန်း, approximately November) in the Burmese calendar. During this period, certain rules of the Vinaya are relaxed for monks. Kahtein trees called badaytha bin (ပဒေသာပင်), on which offerings like money are hung, are also offered. Kahtein trees can also be portrayed by using Kyat money between ten and hundred thousand as desired.

=== Thailand and Laos ===
Kathin (Thai: กฐิน) in Thailand is the name for the robes of an ordained monk.

The ceremony of kathina is called Thot Kathin (Thai: ทอดกฐิน). Under the Thai lunar calendar, the ceremony can begin from the first day of the waning moon of the eleventh month. The presentation of kathin by the King of Thailand's representative is called Royal Kathin Ceremony and often has been an occasion for one of Thailand's Royal Barge Processions.

The Kathin Festival is a traditional Buddhist festival celebrated by villagers in Isan and Laos. Colourful parades and offering ceremonies at the end of monks' retreat at local temples. On Ok Phansa day of the full moon, villagers and city dwellers will go to their local temple for prayers and paying respect to the sacred. Ok Phansa is also the beginning of a 30-day period of merit-making which affords a special opportunity for prayers to Buddha and for the presentation of gifts to the monks for preserving the faith. This 30-day span of merit-making and religious gift-giving is referred to as Thot Kathin.

Thot Kathin takes its name from the "laying down" of new robes to the monks. The offering of new, saffron robes to the monks is particularly meritorious and important. Other gifts to the monks may include basic utensils, toiletries, writing materials, and food. Gift-giving is an act of appreciation and gratitude to the monks. Individuals or community groups (such as a village) may perform them. Many villagers combine efforts by collecting cash donations for the maintenance of their local temple. Such donations are vividly arranged on a "money tree" which looks rather like a colourful Christmas tree bedecked with banknotes as the "foliage". The money tree is ceremoniously paraded to the temple, led by a team of drummers and musicians, with the villagers carrying their own individual gifts on trays bringing up the rear. In this way at Thot Kathin, the lay-people of Thailand reaffirm their faith and, in a joyous fashion, bring gifts to Buddha and his servants.

== See also ==
- Pavarana
- Asalha Puja
- Wan Ok Phansa
- Thadingyut Festival
- Tazaungdaing Festival
- List of Buddhist festivals
