= Ubon Ratchathani =

Ubon Ratchathani อุบลราชธานี
- City Municipality
- City of Ubon Ratchathani เทศบาลนครอุบลราชธานี
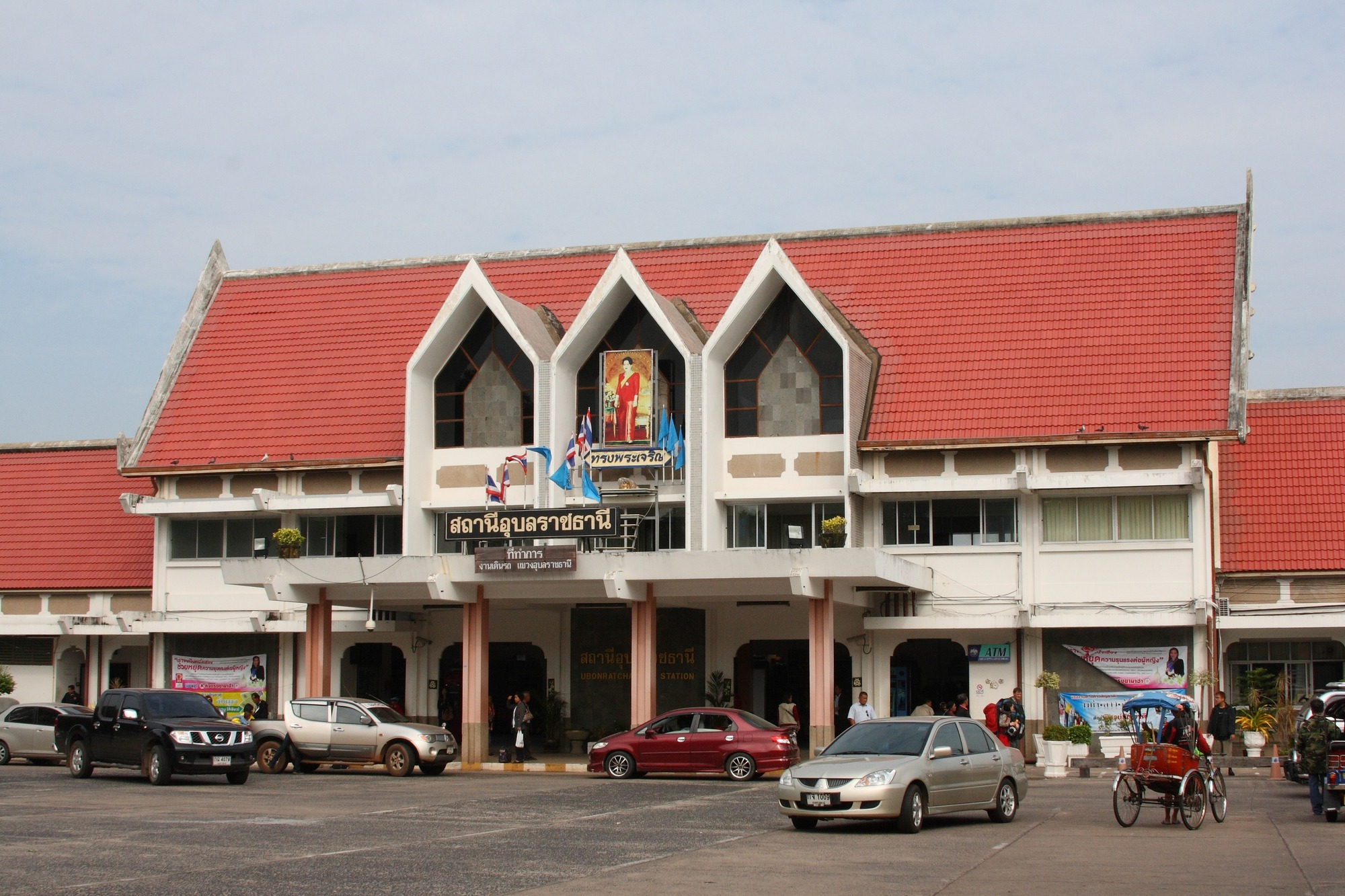
- Ubon Ratchathani Train Station

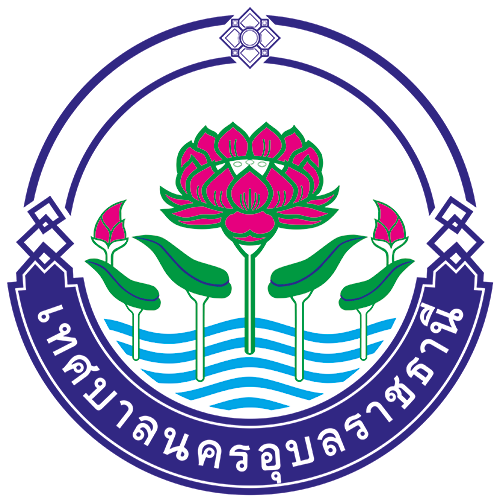
- Seal
- Nickname: Ubon
- Location in Thailand
- Coordinates: 15°13′41″N 104°51′34″E
- Country: Thailand
- Province: Ubon Ratchathani
- District: Mueang Ubon Ratchathani

Government
  - Type: City municipality
  - Mayor: Sompratana Wikraijerdcharoen

Area
  - City Municipality: 29.04 km^{2} (11.21 sq mi)
  - Urban: 406.40 km^{2} (156.91 sq mi)
  - Metro: 1,097.40 km^{2} (423.71 sq mi)
- Elevation: 125 m (410 ft)

Population (December 2025)
  - City Municipality: 67,555 (Registered residents)
  - Density: 2,326.27/km^{2} (6,025.0/sq mi)
  - Urban: 224,338
  - Urban density: 552.01/km^{2} (1,429.7/sq mi)
  - Metro: 390,886 (Ubon–Warin conurbation)
  - Metro density: 356.19/km^{2} (922.5/sq mi)
- Time zone: UTC+7 (ICT)
- Postcode: 35000
- Area code: (+66) 45
- Website: cityub.go.th

Ubon Ratchathani (Thai: อุบลราชธานี, pronounced [ʔubon râːt.tɕʰa.tʰaːniː]), commonly shortened to Ubon (อุบลฯ, meaning "royal lotus city"), is a city (เทศบาลนคร, thesaban nakhon) in northeastern Thailand and the administrative centre of Ubon Ratchathani Province. It is one of the four largest cities in Isan, alongside Nakhon Ratchasima, Udon Thani, and Khon Kaen, collectively known as the "big four of Isan." The city lies on the north bank of the Mun River, approximately 497 km (309 mi) from Bangkok in a straight line, or around 629 km (391 mi) by road.

Across the river on the south bank lies the town of Warin Chamrap, with which Ubon Ratchathani forms a functionally integrated twin-city conurbation: although the two remain separate municipalities linked by road bridges, decades of urban expansion have produced a single, largely continuous built-up area, and the two local governments have since the 2020s coordinated a joint comprehensive urban plan covering both jurisdictions. According to registration statistics compiled by the Department of Provincial Administration, the combined population of the municipalities and subdistricts making up the conurbation was approximately 390,886 as of December 2025 — around 224,338 on the Ubon Ratchathani side and 166,548 on the Warin Chamrap side.

The city was founded in the late 18th century by Thao Kham Phong, later titled Phra Pathum Wongsa, and was formally granted provincial status in 1792 under King Rama I as the administrative centre of the Isan monthon. It grew as a regional administrative, commercial, and educational hub through the 20th century, notably as the site of Ubon Royal Thai Air Force Base, a major United States Air Force installation during the Vietnam War. Ubon Ratchathani is best known internationally for its annual Candle Festival, held each July to mark the beginning of the Buddhist rains retreat, featuring elaborate processions of carved beeswax sculptures.

== History ==
The city was founded in the late 18th century by Thao Kham Phong (ท้าวคำผง), a descendant of Phra Wo and Phra Ta, who fled the authority of King Siribounyasan of Vientiane into the Kingdom of Siam during the reign of King Taksin the Great, and later took the title "Phra Pathum Wongsa" (พระประทุมวงศา) as the settlement's first ruler. In 1792, King Rama I formally granted the settlement provincial status, making Ubon Ratchathani the administrative center of the Isan monthon. Until 1972, it was the largest province in Thailand by area; Yasothon Province was subsequently split off in 1972, followed by Amnat Charoen Province in 1993, after which Ubon Ratchathani became the fifth-largest province.

During the Franco-Thai War of 1940–1941, the city came under aerial attack: French aircraft bombed Ubon between 9 and 13 December 1940, destroying a Royal Thai Air Force aircraft on the ground, part of a broader exchange of border air raids between Thai and Vichy French forces that period.

Ubon Ratchathani grew substantially during World War II, when Japanese forces used the railway to bring in Allied prisoners of war evacuated from work on the Burma Railway near Kanchanaburi. In the city's central Thung Si Mueang Park, former Allied POWs erected the "Monument of Goodness" (อนุสาวรีย์แห่งความดี) in gratitude to local residents who had assisted them during their captivity.

During the Vietnam War, the United States Air Force established a major presence at Ubon Royal Thai Air Force Base (RTAFB) on the outskirts of the city. The 8th Tactical Fighter Wing, flying F-4 Phantom II aircraft, was the host wing from December 1965 into the mid-1970s, and its pilots were credited with numerous aerial victories over North Vietnamese fighters, earning the wing recognition as one of the top-scoring US fighter units of the war. The Royal Australian Air Force also maintained a detachment of CAC Sabre fighters at the base (No. 79 Squadron) from 1962 to 1968, providing air defence for allied aircraft stationed there. The base subsequently became a dual-use facility, also serving as the civilian Ubon Ratchathani Airport.

Some of the city's religious buildings show the influence of Laotian architecture, and Ubon Ratchathani hosts branches of the National Archives of Thailand and the National Museum of Thailand. The influential Buddhist meditation teacher Ajahn Chah (1918–1992), founder of Wat Nong Pah Pong and teacher of Ajahn Sumedho, was born on 17 June 1918 in a farming village near Ubon Ratchathani, in what is now Warin Chamrap district, and went on to help re-establish the Thai Forest Tradition, including its international branch monastery Wat Pah Nanachat.

== Geography ==
Ubon Ratchathani City Municipality is the administrative seat of both Ubon Ratchathani Province and Mueang Ubon Ratchathani District. The city sits at an elevation of approximately 125 m (410 ft) above sea level. The straight-line distance to Bangkok is approximately 497 km (309 mi), while the road distance via highways is approximately 629 km (391 mi).

The city occupies the north bank of the Mun River, while the neighbouring town of Warin Chamrap — administratively a separate municipality within Warin Chamrap District — spans the south bank and forms part of the same contiguous urban area. The two are linked by road bridges across the river, with the city centre organised around Thung Si Mueang Park. The terrain within the municipal area is largely flat floodplain, with the historic core around Thung Si Mueang sitting in a shallow natural basin.

== Urban development ==
Interpreted built-up extent of Ubon Ratchathani–Warin Chamrap, derived from Copernicus Sentinel imagery, with the boundaries of Ubon Ratchathani City Municipality (green) and Warin Chamrap Town Municipality (pink) overlaid against district and sub-district administrative boundaries (red).

Ubon Ratchathani forms a functional twin-city (conurbation) with the adjoining town of Warin Chamrap on the opposite bank of the Mun River. The Mun River physically separates the two municipalities, yet decades of infrastructure investment and cross-river commuting have produced a single, largely continuous built-up area rather than two separate settlements.

=== Historical background ===
Ubon Ratchathani's role as an administrative and commercial hub dates to the reforms of King Rama V, when the town became the seat of Monthon Isan. Warin Chamrap's development followed a different trajectory, growing primarily as a transport node after the north-eastern railway line from Bangkok reached its terminus there in April 1930 — the station itself is named "Ubon Ratchathani" despite lying within Warin Chamrap's municipal boundary. Bridges subsequently built across the Mun River linked the historic administrative core of Ubon Ratchathani with the railway hub in Warin Chamrap, tying the two settlements into a single urban space even though they remained separate municipal entities.

=== Late 20th- and early 21st-century expansion ===
From the late 20th century onward, residential subdivisions, commercial strips, and public facilities filled the previously open land between the two municipal cores, while cross-river commuting intensified — a pattern documented in remote-sensing studies of land-cover change along the Mun River corridor between Warin Chamrap and Mueang Ubon Ratchathani districts, which recorded the conversion of agricultural land and floodplain forest into built-up area. The two municipalities' physical proximity — separated by only a few kilometres — combined with shared transport corridors, has been formally recognised by the Thai Department of Public Works and Town & Country Planning, which since the 2020s has coordinated a joint comprehensive plan covering both Ubon Ratchathani City Municipality and Warin Chamrap Town Municipality as a single planning area, rather than preparing separate plans for each.

=== Polycentric structure ===
Rather than expanding radially from a single centre, as seen in some other regional Thai cities, the conurbation has developed a polycentric pattern: Ubon Ratchathani retains the primary concentration of provincial government offices, commerce, and education (including Ubon Ratchathani Rajabhat University), while Warin Chamrap functions as a secondary centre built around the railway terminal, Ubon Ratchathani University, and residential districts.

=== Flood risk and future planning ===
Because both districts lie in the low-lying Mun River basin, flooding is a recurring constraint on urban growth on both banks. Major floods in 2002 and 2019 inundated large parts of both Mueang Ubon Ratchathani and Warin Chamrap districts simultaneously, damaging bridges and displacing thousands of residents in both jurisdictions. Academic flood-risk assessments treat the Ubon Ratchathani urban area as a single system straddling the river, modelling flood susceptibility across both banks together. Research on urban mobility has likewise proposed relocation and flood-resilient transport measures spanning the combined urban area rather than either municipality alone. The ongoing joint comprehensive plan for Ubon Ratchathani–Warin Chamrap explicitly identifies improved cross-river connectivity, coordinated flood management, and riverfront development as priorities for strengthening the conurbation's role as a regional urban centre.

== Climate ==
Ubon Ratchathani has a tropical wet and dry climate (Köppen climate classification Aw). Winters are dry and very warm. Temperatures rise until April with an average daily maximum of 36.4 °C (97.5 °F). The monsoon season runs from late April to October, characterized by heavy rain and somewhat cool daytime temperatures, although nights remain warm.

Climate data for Ubon Ratchathani (1991–2020, extremes 1951-present)
Month	Jan	Feb	Mar	Apr	May	Jun	Jul	Aug	Sep	Oct	Nov	Dec	Year
Record high °C (°F)	37.2 (99.0)	39.2 (102.6)	40.6 (105.1)	43.1 (109.6)	42.3 (108.1)	38.3 (100.9)	38.5 (101.3)	35.8 (96.4)	37.1 (98.8)	35.2 (95.4)	36.5 (97.7)	35.9 (96.6)	43.1 (109.6)
Mean daily maximum °C (°F)	32.1 (89.8)	34.1 (93.4)	35.9 (96.6)	36.6 (97.9)	35.1 (95.2)	33.8 (92.8)	32.7 (90.9)	32.2 (90.0)	32.1 (89.8)	32.3 (90.1)	32.2 (90.0)	31.2 (88.2)	33.4 (92.1)
Daily mean °C (°F)	24.6 (76.3)	26.5 (79.7)	29.0 (84.2)	30.1 (86.2)	29.3 (84.7)	28.7 (83.7)	28.1 (82.6)	27.8 (82.0)	27.6 (81.7)	27.1 (80.8)	26.0 (78.8)	24.3 (75.7)	27.4 (81.4)
Mean daily minimum °C (°F)	18.1 (64.6)	20.1 (68.2)	23.0 (73.4)	24.6 (76.3)	24.9 (76.8)	24.9 (76.8)	24.6 (76.3)	24.4 (75.9)	24.1 (75.4)	22.8 (73.0)	20.9 (69.6)	18.7 (65.7)	22.6 (72.7)
Record low °C (°F)	7.6 (45.7)	11.5 (52.7)	10.3 (50.5)	16.4 (61.5)	18.8 (65.8)	20.2 (68.4)	20.0 (68.0)	20.0 (68.0)	19.2 (66.6)	15.9 (60.6)	12.5 (54.5)	8.5 (47.3)	7.6 (45.7)
Average precipitation mm (inches)	3.2 (0.13)	11.3 (0.44)	28.6 (1.13)	82.6 (3.25)	222.9 (8.78)	236.9 (9.33)	293.8 (11.57)	291.4 (11.47)	314.4 (12.38)	112.1 (4.41)	21.8 (0.86)	5.0 (0.20)	1,624 (63.94)
Average precipitation days (≥ 1.0 mm)	0.3	0.9	2.6	5.2	12.2	14.0	16.4	17.8	16.3	7.7	1.7	0.3	95.4
Average relative humidity (%)	64.9	62.8	62.1	65.6	73.9	77.6	79.5	81.3	82.1	76.5	70.5	67.3	72.0
Mean monthly sunshine hours	259.5	242.7	245.0	234.4	214.7	165.1	152.0	139.1	141.3	197.2	231.9	238.1	2,460.9
Mean daily sunshine hours	7.3	7.5	6.5	6.2	5.1	3.9	3.9	3.8	3.6	4.7	6.2	7.2	5.5
Source 1: World Meteorological Organization
Source 2: Office of Water Management and Hydrology, Royal Irrigation Department (daily sun 1981–2010)(extremes)

== Festivals ==
Ubon Ratchathani is best known for its annual Candle Festival (งานประเพณีแห่เทียนเข้าพรรษา), held in July to mark Asalha Puja and the beginning of the rains retreat for Buddhist monks, known as Wan Khao Phansa or "Buddhist Lent." The custom originated in the practice of donating candles to temples so that monks would have light to study by during the three-month retreat, at a time before electricity was available. Between 1901 and 1936, His Royal Highness Prince Chumphonsomphot Krom Luang Sanphasitthiprasong, a son of King Mongkut and governor of Monthon Isan, is credited with developing the candle procession into the province's principal festival, replacing the earlier Bun Bang Fai (Rocket Festival) celebration.

On the day of Asalha Puja, the wax sculptures — which by this stage of preparation can take individual teams of artisans from several districts up to a year to carve — are brought to Thung Si Mueang, the park in the centre of the city, where they are put on public display in the evening. Smaller candlelit processions (wian tian) are also held that evening at temples throughout the country, but the main procession in Ubon Ratchathani takes place the following morning, Wan Khao Phansa, when more than fifty decorated floats parade from Wat Si Ubon Rattanaram along Uparat Road, accompanied by traditional Thai dance and music performed by community groups from across the province. The sculptures typically depict scenes from Buddhist mythology, the Jataka tales, and the Ramayana, carved from beeswax and paraffin and finished with gold leaf and coloured glasswork; competing districts are formally judged for their craftsmanship.

== Sights and attractions ==
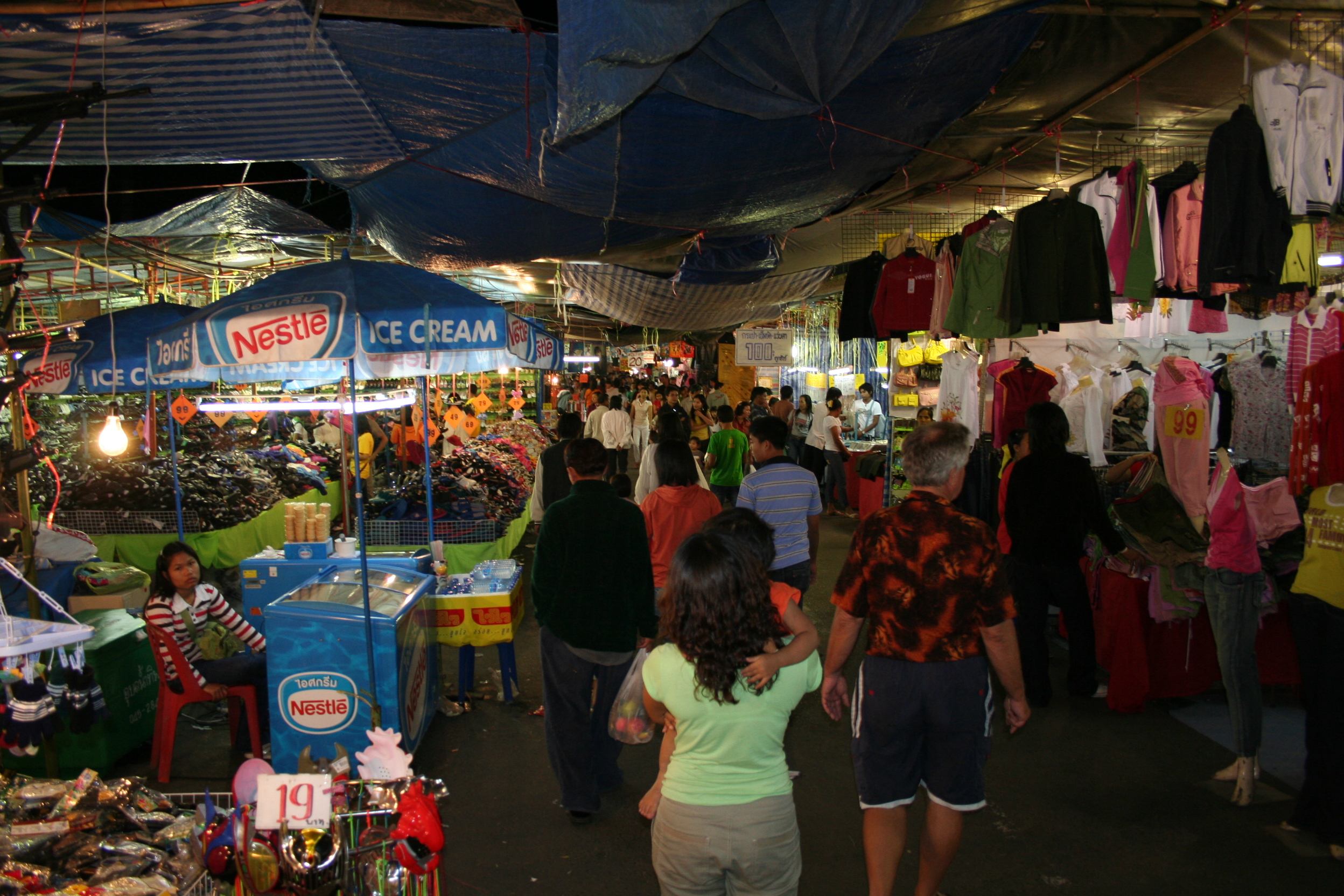
Isan people buying and selling goods at the night market in Ubon Ratchathani.

The city centre is organised around Thung Si Mueang, a public park that also serves as the main venue of the annual Candle Festival. Nearby stands Wat Thung Si Muang (วัดทุ่งศรีเมือง), noted for its wooden scripture hall (ho trai) built on stilts over a small pond, a design intended to protect the manuscripts from termites. Southwest of the park is Wat Si Ubon Rattanaram, considered the city's founding temple and the starting point of the Candle Festival procession.

North of the city centre, near the Big C mall, is Wat Phra That Nong Bua, a 56 m (184 ft) white stupa modelled on the Mahabodhi Temple in Bodh Gaya, India, and one of the city's most visible landmarks.

South of Thung Si Mueang, the Ubon Ratchathani National Museum occupies a century-old building that formerly served as the city hall, with exhibits on the province's geology, history, and local handicrafts. The adjacent Thung Sri Muang Night Market (ตลาดโต้รุ่ง ทุ่งศรีเมือง) operates every evening in the city centre, offering Isan, Thai, and Vietnamese food stalls, handicrafts, and live performances.

== Education ==
=== High schools ===
Two large public secondary schools in the city centre — Benchama Maharat School and Narinukun School — trace their origins to the late 19th and early 20th centuries, making them among the oldest schools in Isan.

- Benchama Maharat School (โรงเรียนเบ็ญจะมะมหาราช) originated in 1897 as Ubon Witthayakhom School, established at Wat Suppatanaram with funding partly donated by King Chulalongkorn. It was relocated and renamed in 1915, when Prince Chakrabongse Bhuvanath presided over the opening of a new school building beside Thung Si Mueang and bestowed the name "Benchama Maharat" as a memorial to King Chulalongkorn. The school moved to its present site on Sunpasit Road in 1973.
- Narinukun School (โรงเรียนนารีนุกูล was founded in 1885 as a private school run by Nang Chongratchakit (Nu Sirisathit); it was formally named "Narinukun" in 1900 by Phra Ubali Gunupamacariya (Chan Sirichanto), the ecclesiastical head of Monthon Ubon Ratchathani. Originally a girls' school, it became coeducational in 1995 and remains located on Chaengsanit Road in the city centre.

Other schools in the city include Ave Maria School and Assumption School on Chayangkun Road, a private Catholic school.

=== Higher education ===
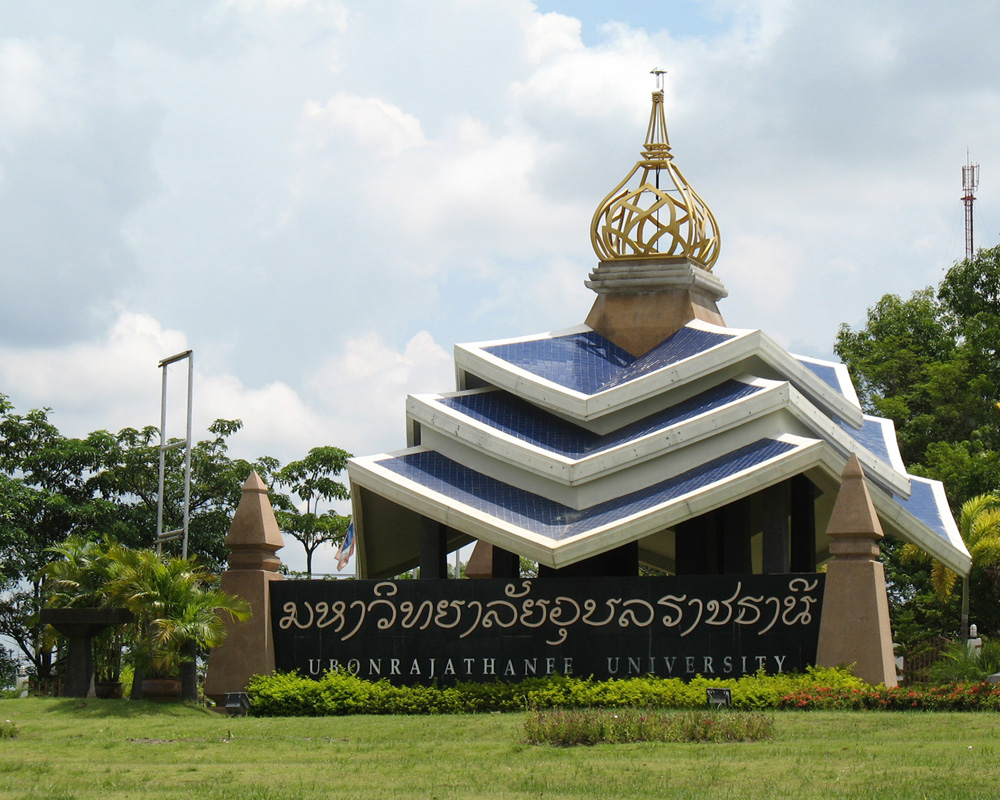
Ubon Ratchathani University

- Ubon Ratchathani University, a public university originally established in 1987 as a campus of Khon Kaen University before gaining independent status in 1990, occupies a rural campus 15 km (9.3 mi) south of the city centre, in Warin Chamrap district.
- Ubon Ratchathani Rajabhat University, a former teacher-training college upgraded to university status, located just north of the central city.
- Ratchathani University, a private university with a large campus between the km5 post on the Ring Road and the Mun River.
- Mahachulalongkorn Ratchawitthayalai University, a Bangkok-based Buddhist university, operates a small campus at Wat Mahawanaram in the city, and a larger campus in Tambon Krasop, northeast of the Ring Road.
- North Eastern Polytechnic College, with a campus on Chayangkun Road near the Big C Mall.
- Ubon Polytechnic College, on Chongkonnithan Road, west of the city centre.
- Ratchathani Technology Vocational College, north of the Ring Road on Ubon 2 Road.
- Sukhothai Thammathirat Open University, while Bangkok-based, operates a small satellite centre next to the National Archives, a block west of the Ring Road.
- Ubon Ratchathani Technical College, near SK Mall.
- Ubon Ratchathani Vocational College, on Phrommarat Road in the city centre.
- Boromarajonani College of Nursing Sappasithipasong, a block east of Sapphasit Prasong Hospital.

== Transportation ==
=== Airport ===
Ubon Ratchathani Airport (IATA: UBP, ICAO: VTUU) serves as both a commercial facility and an active Royal Thai Air Force (RTAF) base, home to Wing 21 of the RTAF 2nd Air Division, whose 211 Squadron flies the Northrop F-5E/F Tiger II. The airfield was first opened in 1921 to allow doctors and medical supplies to be flown in during a smallpox and cholera outbreak; it became a military airbase in the 1950s and was used by the United States Air Force and Royal Australian Air Force during the Vietnam War, before being opened to civilian traffic in 1975.

=== Bus terminal ===
The city's main bus station is in the northwest, on the Ring Road (Highway 231), 500 m (1,600 ft) west of its intersection with Chayangkun Road (Highway 212), close to the Big C store. Nakhonchai Air operates a separate private bus terminal just across from the main station.

=== Railway terminal ===
The terminus of the State Railway of Thailand's Northeastern Line — the Ubon Ratchathani Branch Line — is Ubon Ratchathani railway station, located not in the city itself but across the river in Warin Chamrap District, roughly 575 km (357 mi) from Bangkok by rail. The station opened as "Warin" station in April 1930, when the railhead from Bangkok first reached the area, and was later renamed Ubon Ratchathani. Long-distance services on this line now depart from Krung Thep Aphiwat Central Terminal (Bang Sue) in Bangkok, which replaced Hua Lamphong as the terminus for most Northern and Northeastern Line trains following its opening in 2021.

== Notable people ==
- Parinya Saenkhammuen (born 1983), footballer
- Mina Tanaka (born 1994), Japanese footballer

== Gallery ==
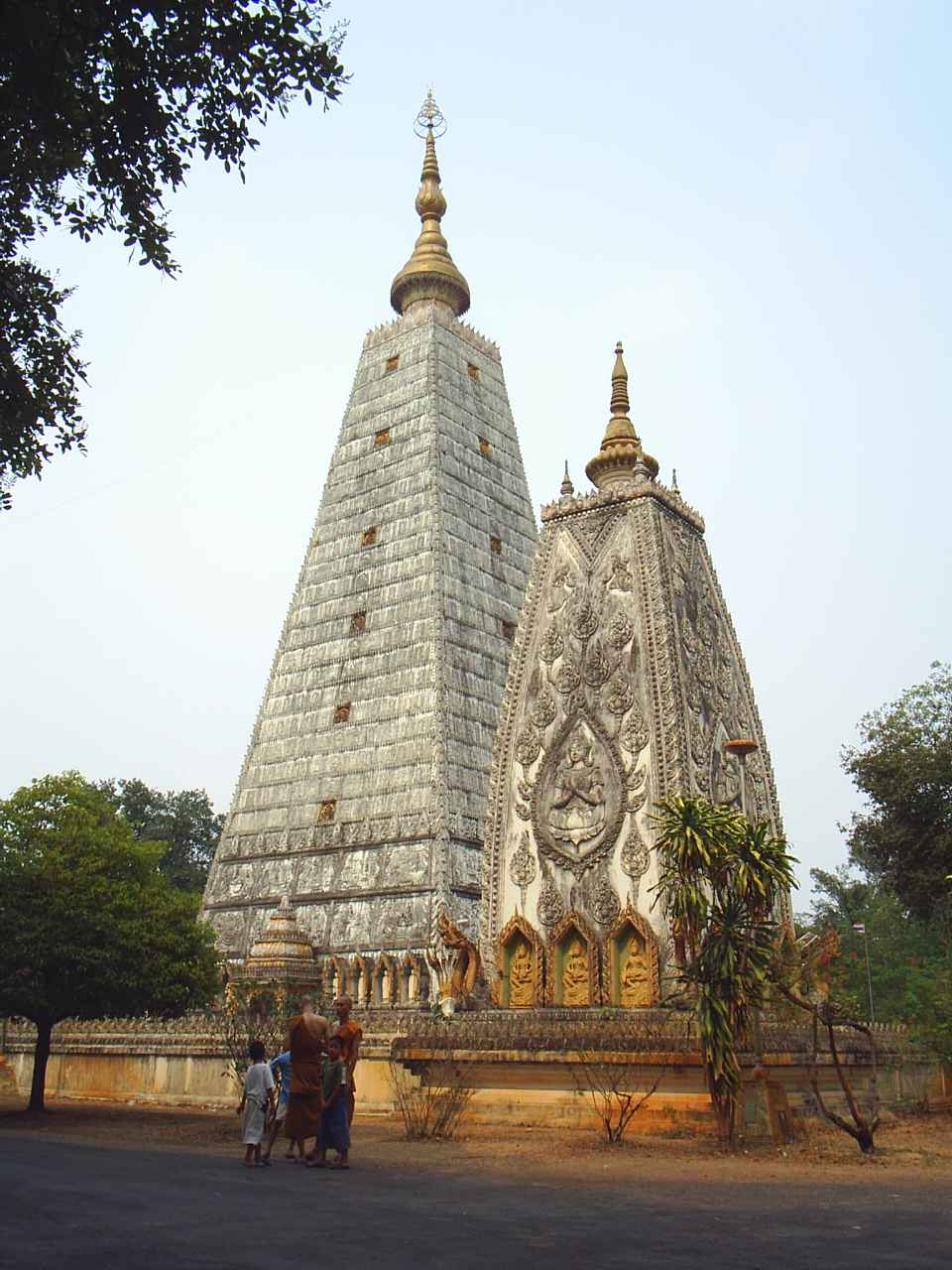
Chedi, Wat Nong Bua

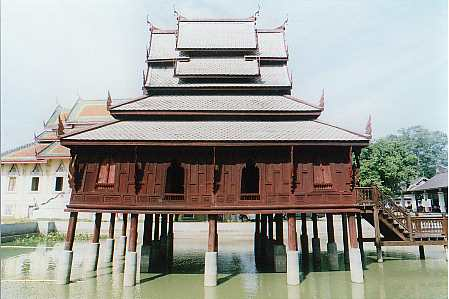
Library, Thung Si Mueang temple

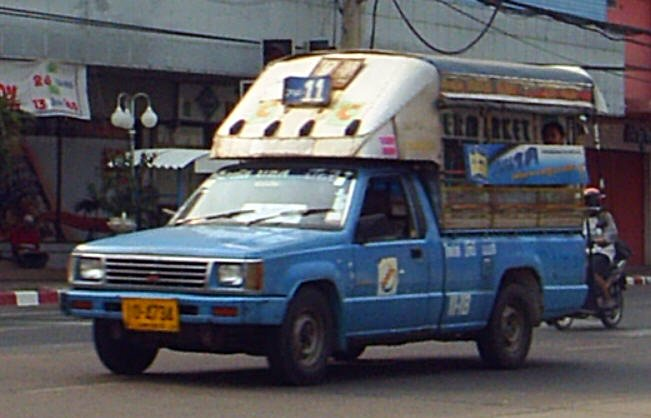
Songthaew near Thung Si Mueang

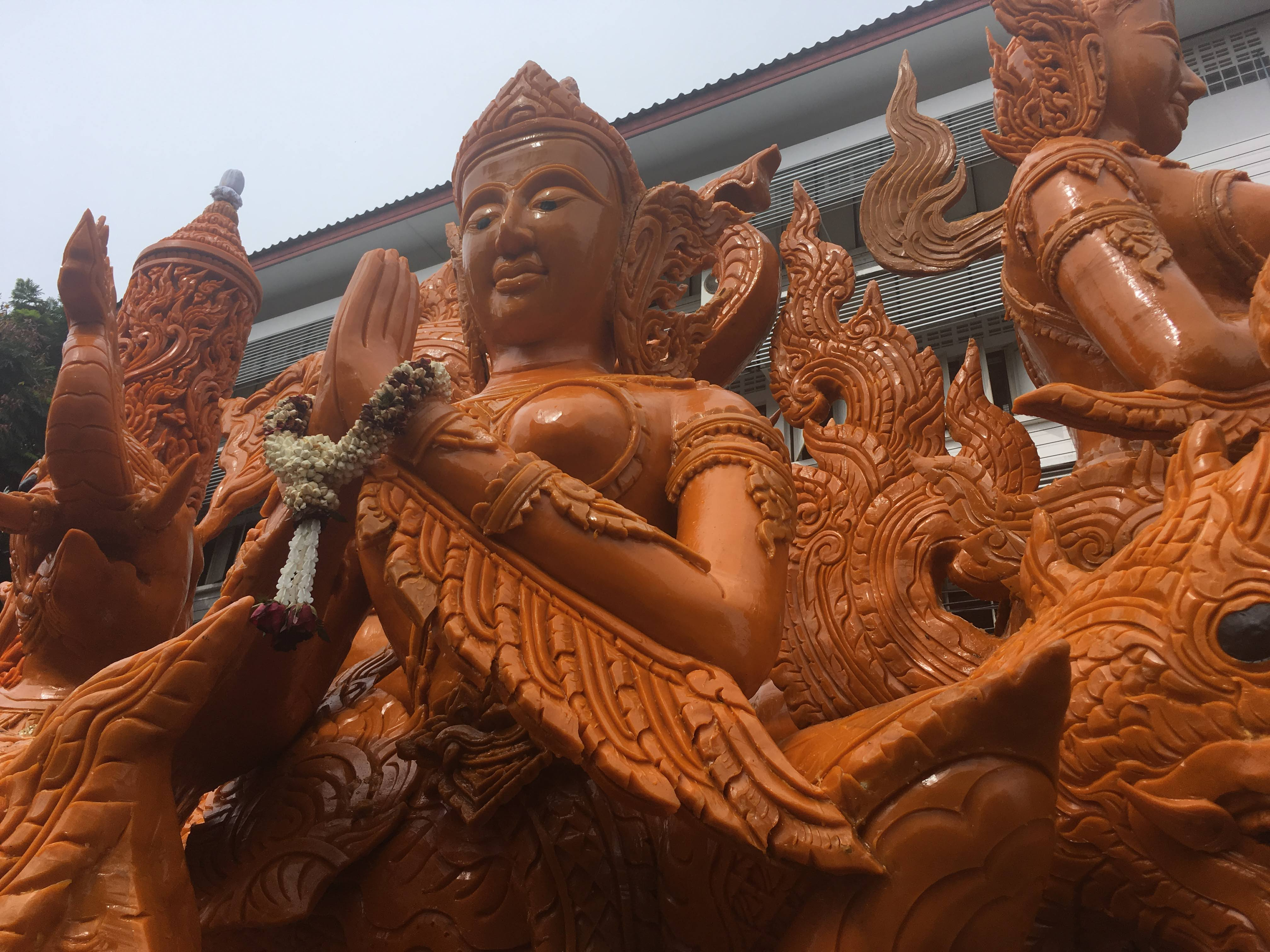
Candle festival

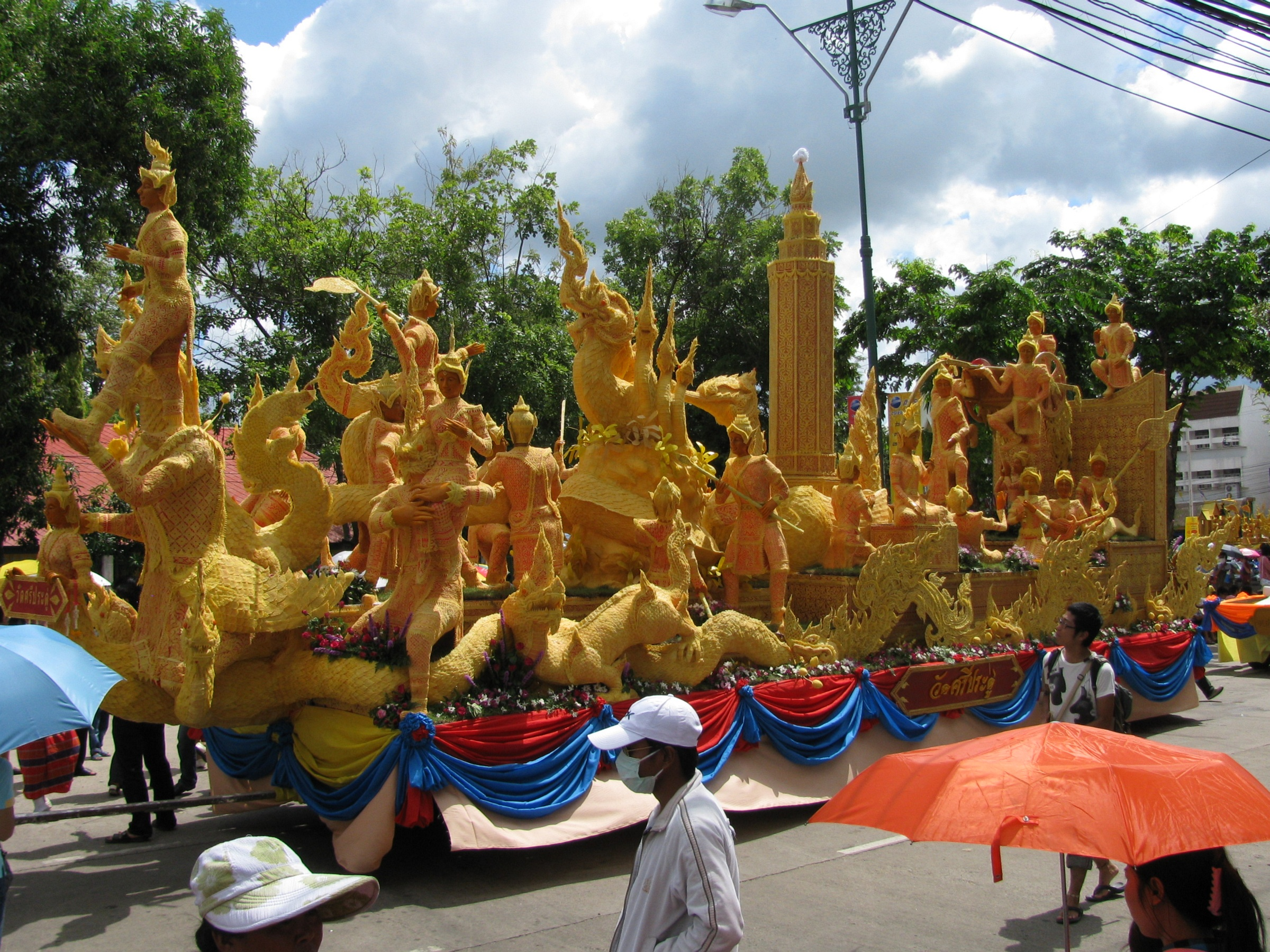
Candle Festival, Ubon Ratchathani

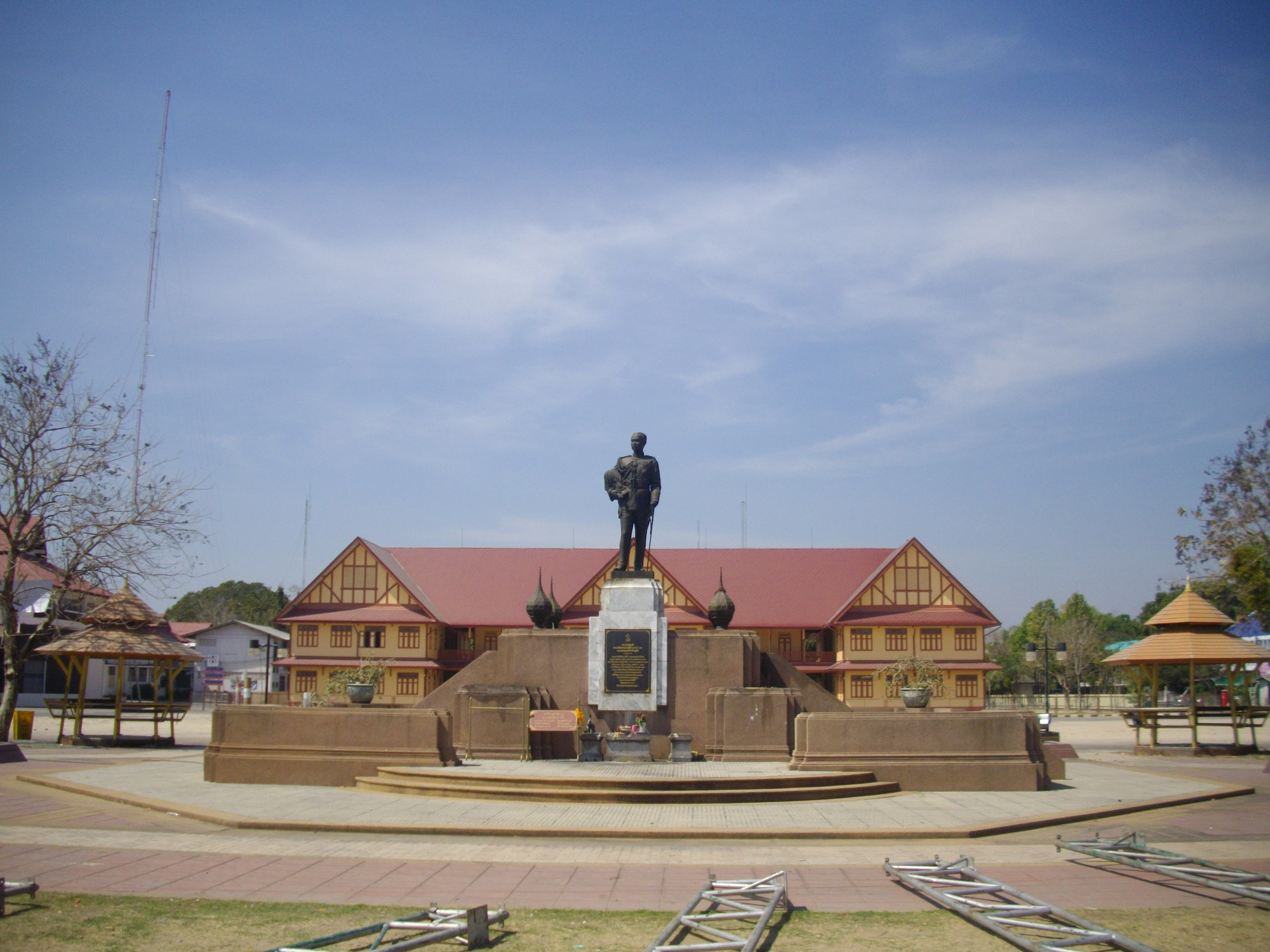
Statue of Rama V at the old building of Benchama Maharat School

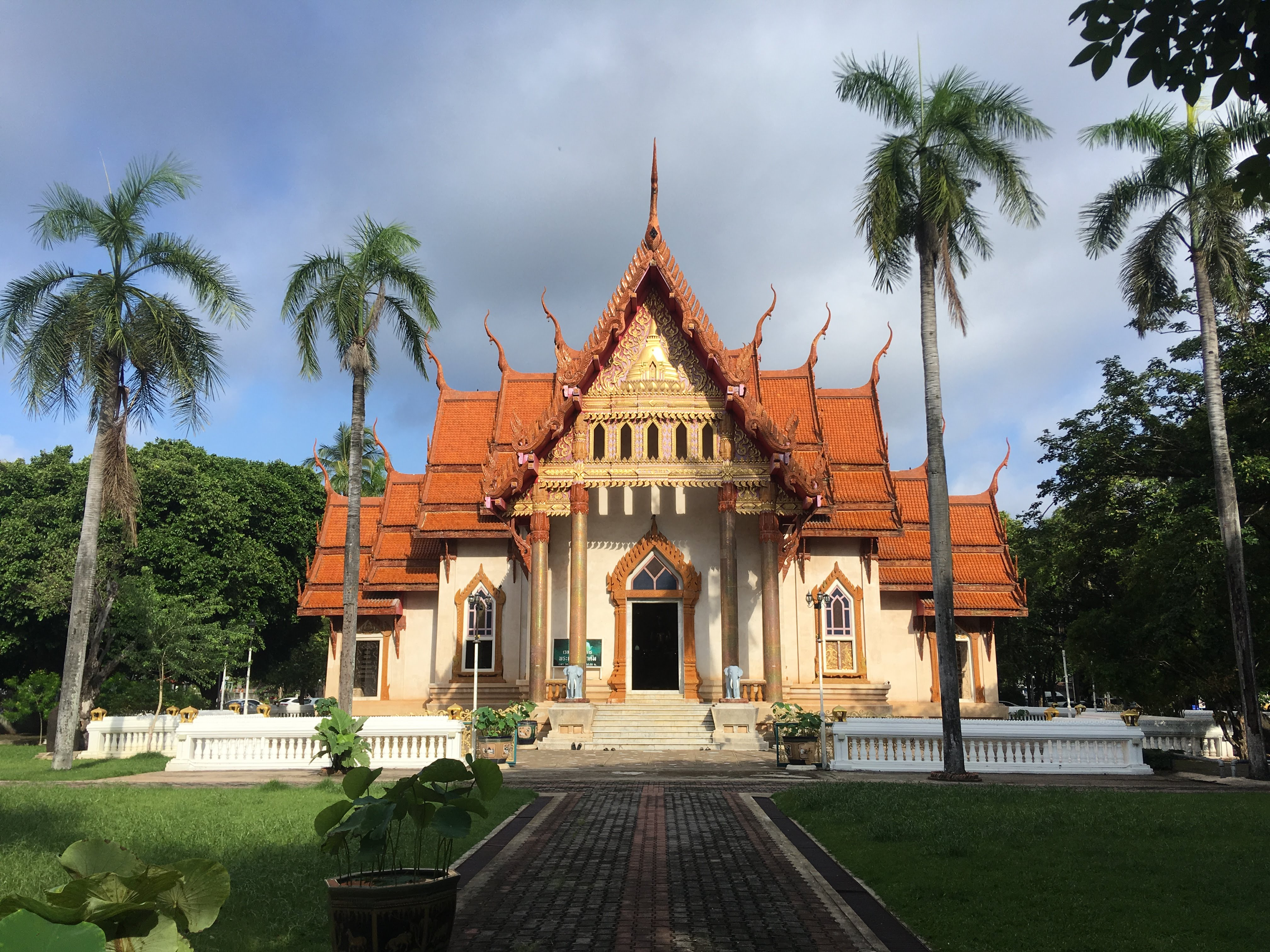
Wat Sri Ubon Rattanaram

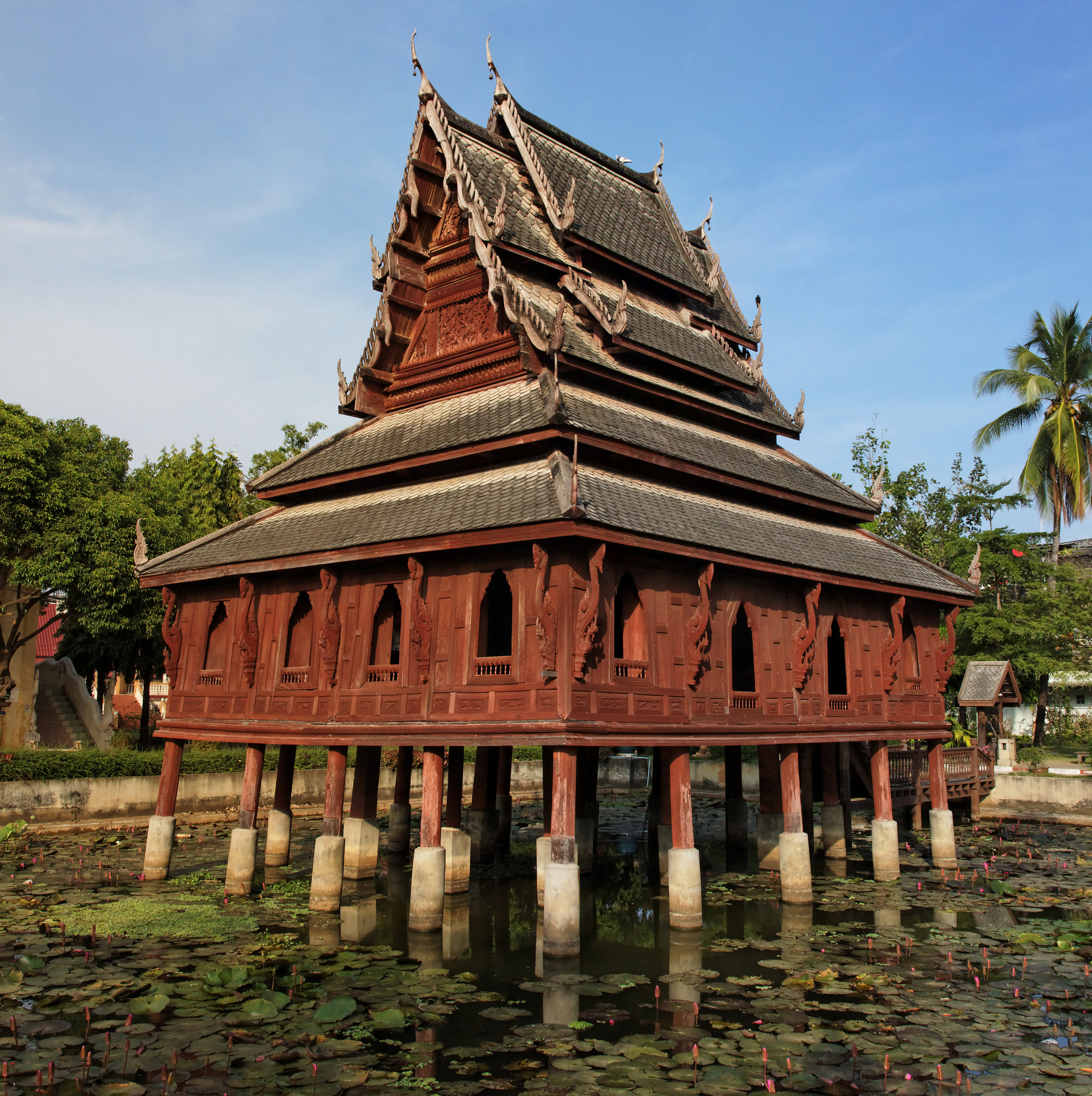
Wat Thung Si Mueang
