= Parinya Saenkhammuen =

Thai footballer (born 1983)

Personal information
- Full name: Parinya Saenkhammuen
- Date of birth: September 1, 1983 (age 43)
- Place of birth: Ubonratchathani, Thailand
- Height: 1.82 m (5 ft 11 1/2 in)
- Position: Center back

Team information
- Current team: Pattaya United
- Number: 3

Senior career*
Years	Team	Apps	(Gls)
–2011	Air Force United F.C.		
2011–?	Pattaya United F.C.		
2013	Pattaya United F.C.		
- * Club domestic league appearances and goals

Parinya Saenkhammuen (Thai: ปริญญา แสนคำหมื่น; born 1 September 1983) is a Thai association football center back. He plays for Thai Premier League club Pattaya United. He was voted the best defender in the 2010 Thai Division 1 League whilst playing for Air Force United F.C. His Thai nickname is "Joe."

== Clubs ==
- Air Force United F.C.
- Pattaya United F.C.

== See also ==
- Football in Thailand
- List of football clubs in Thailand
