= Tazaungdaing festival =

Important Buddhist festival in Myanmar

Tazaungdaing Festival တန်ဆောင်တိုင်ပွဲတော်
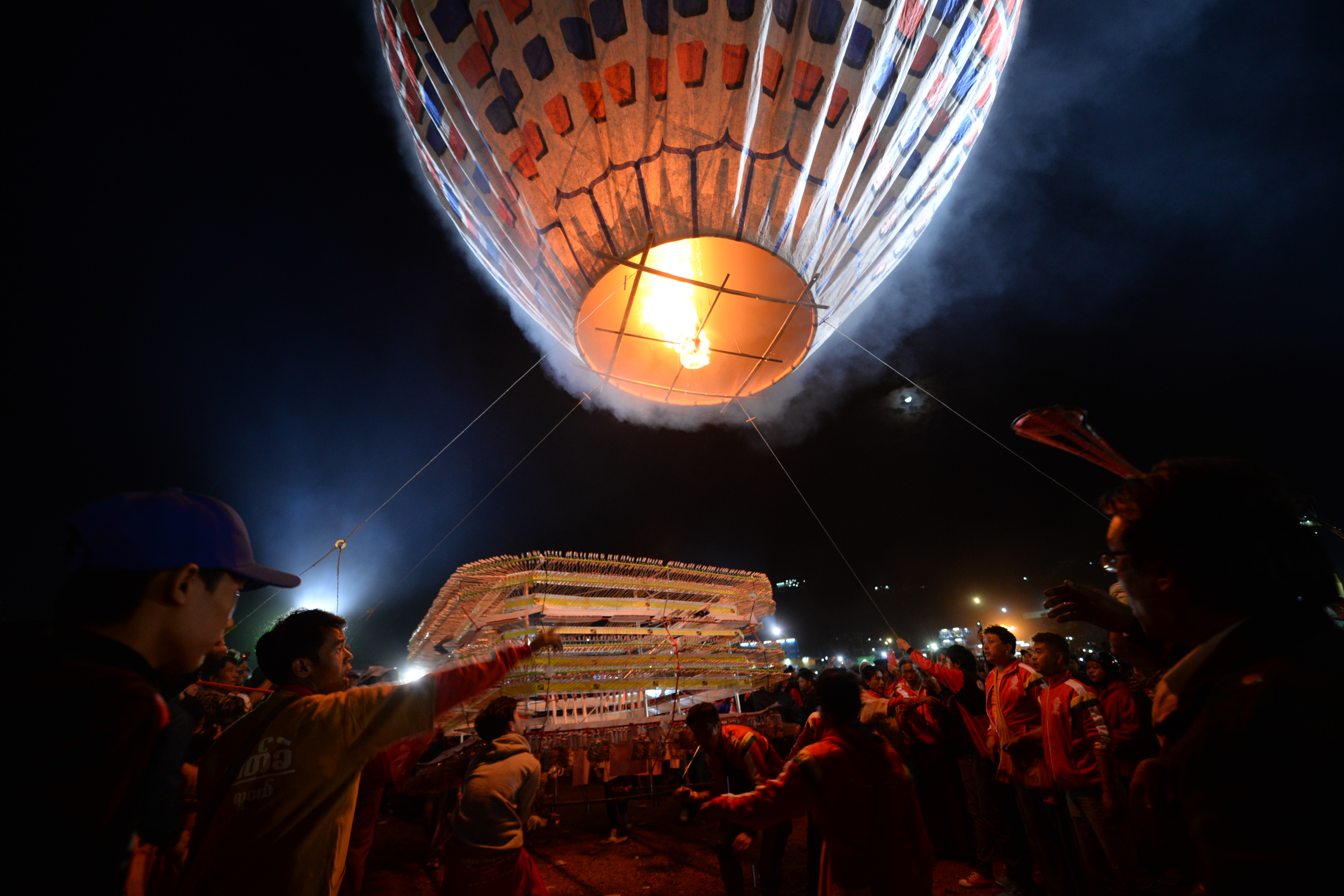
- Fireworks being attached to a hot air balloon at the fireworks competition during Tazaungdaing in Taunggyi
- Also called: Festival of Lights
- Observed by: Burmese
- Type: Buddhist
- Date: Full moon day of Tazaungmon
- Related to: Loy Krathong (in Thailand and Laos), Il Poya (in Sri Lanka), Bon Om Touk (in Cambodia)

The Tazaungdaing Festival (Burmese: တန်ဆောင်တိုင်ပွဲတော်, also known as the Festival of Lights and spelt Tazaungdine Festival), held on the full moon day of Tazaungmon, the eighth month of the Burmese calendar, is celebrated as a national holiday in Myanmar and marks the end of the rainy season. It also marks the beginning of the Kathina (Kahtein in Burmese) season, during which monks are offered new robes and alms.

The festival's origins predate the introduction of Buddhism to Burma, and are believed to stem from the Kattika festival, which honors the guardian planets in Indian astrology.

== Celebrations ==
Robe-weaving competitions to weave special yellow monk robes called matho thingan (မသိုးသင်္ကန်း) are also held throughout the country, most notably in Yangon's Shwedagon Pagoda. During these competitions, held for two consecutive nights (the night preceding and the night of the full moon), contestants work nonstop from night until dawn to weave these garments. The tradition commemorates a widely known story of the Buddha's life. Seeing that the Buddha would soon renunciate, the Buddha's mother, Maya, who had been reborn in the Tavatimsa heaven, spent the entire night weaving yellow monk robes for him. Her sister Gotami (Buddha's aunt) continued this tradition and offered new robes annually.

In many parts of Myanmar, hot air balloons lit with candles, are released to celebrate the full moon day, similar to Yi Peng celebrations in Northern Thailand. The balloons are released as an offering to the Sulamani cetiya in Tavitisma, a heaven in Buddhist cosmology and home of the devas, or as a way to drive away evil spirits. Among Tazaungdaing festivals, Taunggyi's hot-air balloons and firework-launching competition is the most prominent festival. The origin of Taunggyi's hot-air balloons contest dates back to 1894, when the British first held hot air balloon competitions in Taunggyi, soon after the annexation of Upper Burma.

Alms-giving and charity, both religious and secular, including satuditha feasts (စတုဒိသာ), are also commonly undertaken during this festival, as a means of merit-making. Others return home to pay homage to elders (gadaw) and visit pagodas. Many concerts and other secular festivities, such as live performances of traditional dramas like the Yama Zatdaw, are also held between Thadingyut (the end of the Buddhist lent) and Tazaungdaing.

In pre-colonial times, the Burmese court celebrate five parishad Or pravarana day from ancient times 15th day of kartik month to the full moon day mentioned in I tsing Chinese notes. On the eighth waning day of that month, after a procession to the king, 8 pyatthat structures made of bamboo were burned.

In Burmese tradition, during the full moon day of Tazaungmon, Burmese families pick Siamese cassia buds and prepare it in a salad called mezali phu thoke (မယ်ဇလီဖူးသုပ်) or in a soup. On this night, young men celebrate a custom called "kyimano pwe" (ကျီးမနိုးပွဲ, lit. "Don't wake the crows up"), by practicing mischief on their neighbors, by stealing or playing tricks on them.

== Regional traditions ==
- Residents of Madauk, Nyaunglebin Township and Pathein celebrate with a mi hmyaw pwe (မီးမျှောပွဲ).
- Residents of Dawei hold a procession of the 28 Buddhas
- Residents of Mawlamyine, Kyaikkhami and other coastal towns in Mon State, Lower Myanmar hold a swam oo hmyaw pwe, in which earthenware bowls filled with offertories such as flowers, fruits, vegetarian desserts, candles and joss-sticks are set adrift at sea to the arahat Shin Upagutta at the dawn.

== See also ==
- Pavarana
- Kathina
- Vassa
- Wan Ok Phansa
- Thadingyut Festival
- Bon Om Tuk, Cambodian equivalent of Tazaungdaing
- Loi Krathong, Thai and Lao equivalent of Tazaungdaing
- Vessantara Festival
