= Vassa candle =

Large candle for Buddhist festival

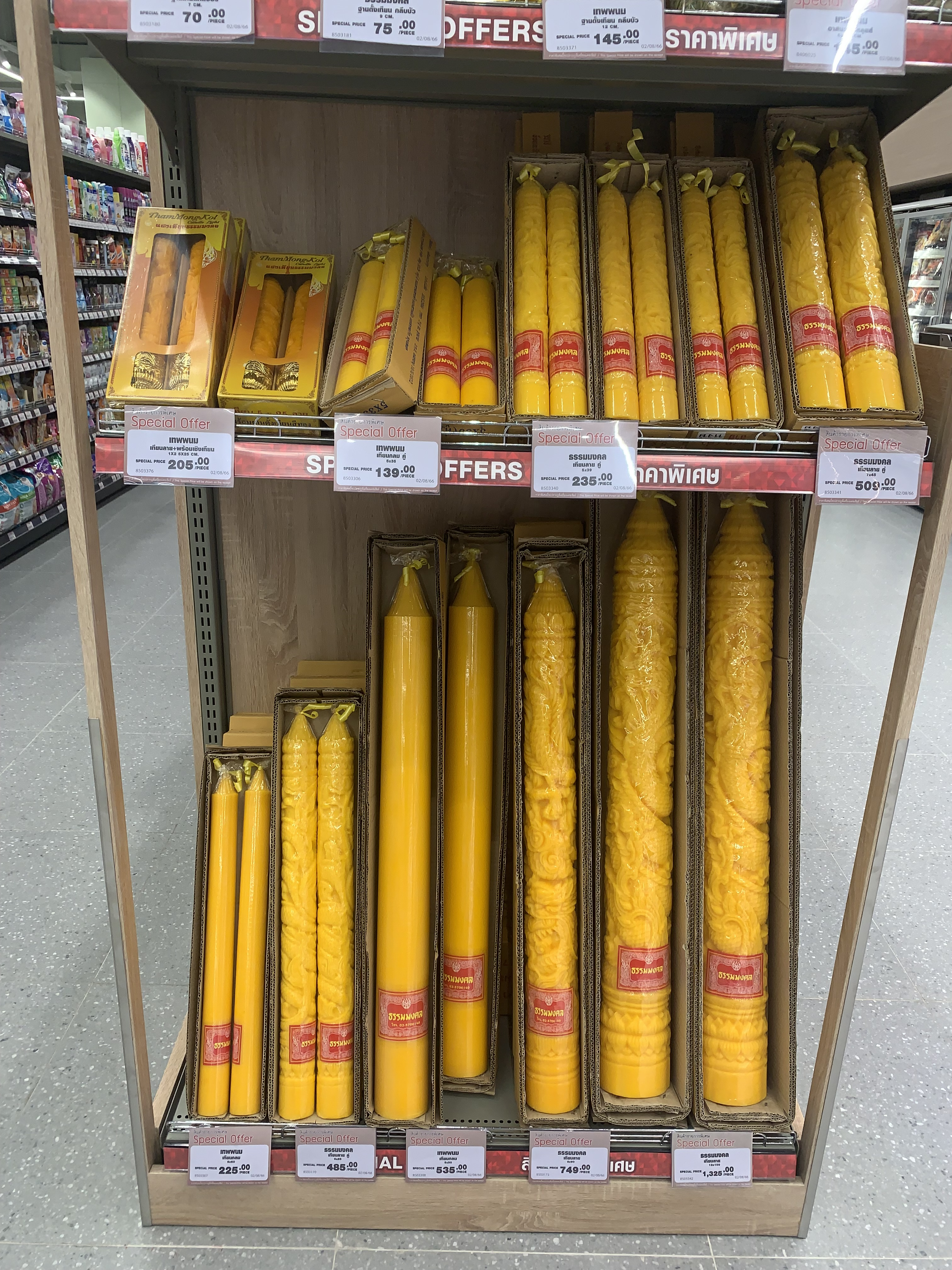
Ready-made Vassa candles in various sizes selling in a Bangkok supermarket

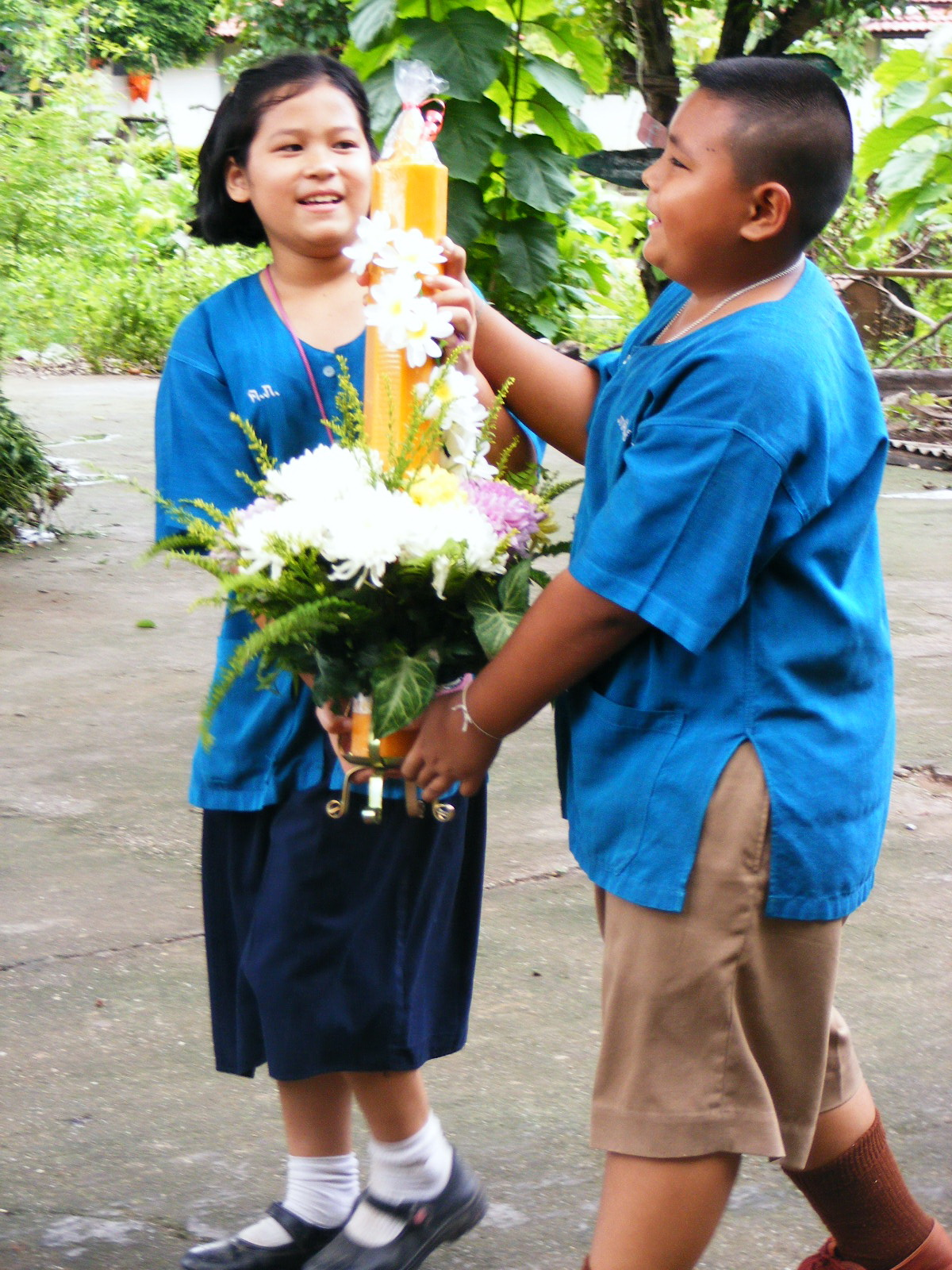
A Vassa candle being carried in procession

A Vassa candle, or Tean Vassa, is a giant beeswax candle that is burned for the duration of the Theravada Buddhist festival of Vassa. These candles are most frequently used in Cambodia and Thailand. The Vassa candle has been compared to the paschal candle of Christians, burned during the entirety of Paschaltide.

== History ==
=== Angkorian origin ===
Tchen-t'an was an ancient Angkorian rite that was associated with a large candle, sometimes compared to the Vassa candle. According to the Chinese diplomat Zhou Daguan who visited Angkor in the 12th century, tchen-t'an was a rite of deflowering girls between the ages of seven and nine years.

=== Buddhist rite ===
Archaeologists found the remains of a sandstone candle holder made by Buddhists at Wat Langka Krao in Siem Reap between 1807 and 1857. The oldest written Buddhist reference to the Vassa candle is in the Cambodian Royal Chronicles, composed between 1848 and 1859 during the reign of King Ang Duong.

=== Wax candle festivals ===
In the pre-electric era, people made temple offerings of candles that monks could use to illuminate temples during the darker days of the rainy season. Candle-giving morphed into the Ubon Ratchathani Candle Festival, one of Thailand's more colourful festivals. The candles are carved a few days before the festival with designs that are so intricate that some observers consider them to be "extravagant". In various localities of Thailand, teams come from all over the world for competitions carving these giant wax artworks.

== Ritual ==
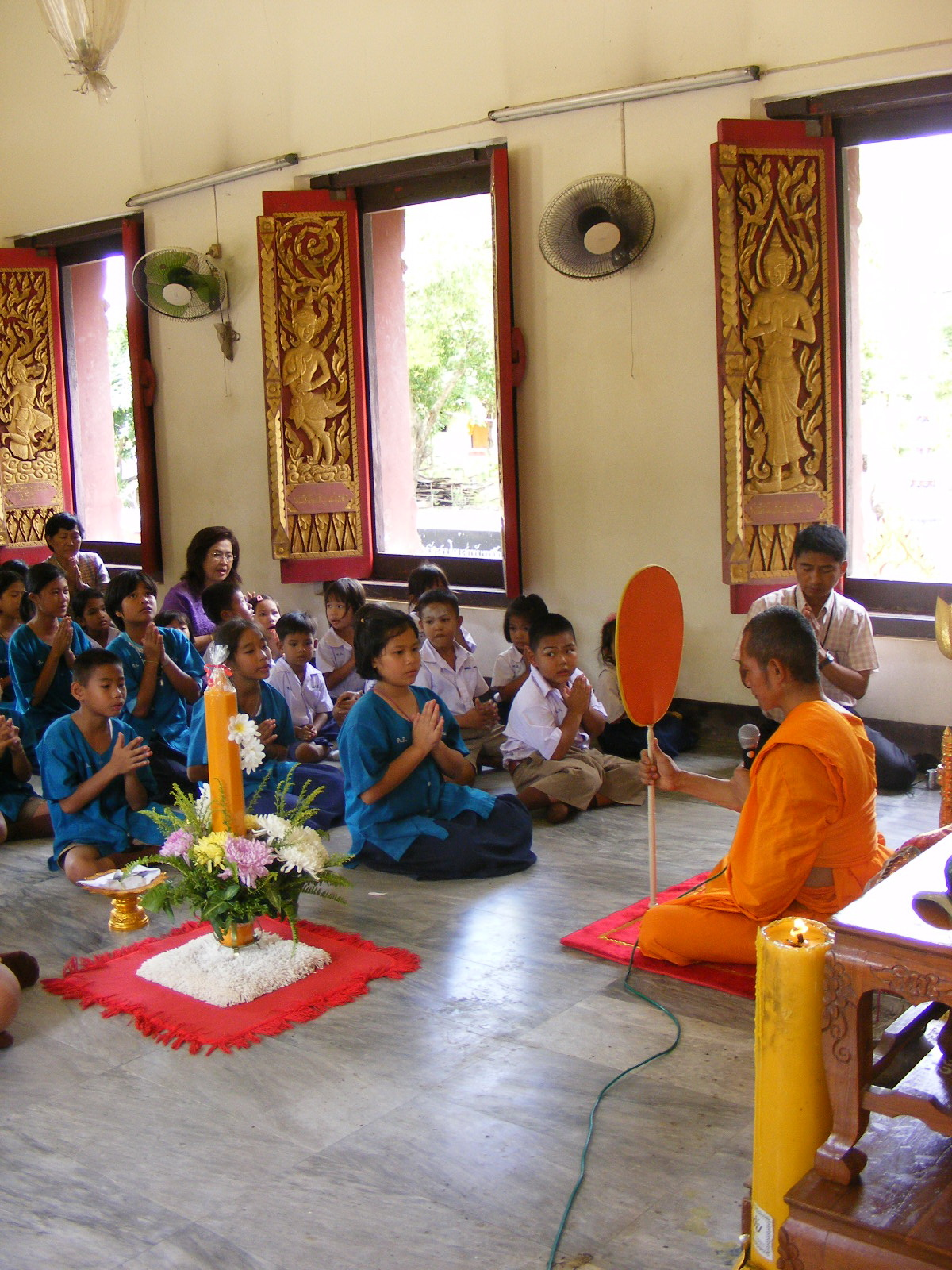
A Thai celebration of Vassa utilizing a Vassa candle.

=== Moulding ===
In Cambodia, an annual ceremony known as sett tean Vassa is held at the royal palace to mould Vassa candles. While sitting on his throne, the Khmer monarch pours the melted wax into moulds that are held by the purohit baku, the priest who serves the palace.

=== Offering ===
Men usually carry the Vassa candle, bringing it to Buddhist pagodas in an elaborate procession. Carrying and offering the Vassa candle is an honor that is highly sought by government officials and benefactors of Cambodian pagodas.

=== Lighting ===
While monks have historically lighted the Vassa candle, laypeople have more recently been granted this privilege. In the past, the candle could be lit only with fire coming from a stone beaten by a lighter or by fire obtained by the friction of two bamboo sticks. Today, a match is allowed to be used. Once lit, the candle burns for the entire length of the Vassa festival.

== Fabrication ==
A Vassa candle is traditionally prepared by an achar from 12 kilograms (26 pounds) of natural beeswax. The beeswax is usually recycled by melting old candle stumps that are collected from within the temple or donated by the surrounding villages. Hairdryers are used to re-soften the wax, allowing it to be moulded and created into shapes. Then, sculptors create intricate carvings and details of the candle's exterior.

A Vassa candle measures 93 centimetres (37 inches) in length. It is seated on a pedestal or throne called balan, about 29 centimetres (11 inches) tall. Another candle is placed on top of the Vassa candle; this smaller candle is the one that is lit. The smaller wax candle is carved with the intricate design of lotus flowers. It is often crowned with a small receptacle filled with coconut oil, which burns instead of the wax.

== Symbolism ==
Vassa candles are considered to be "the light for life", that lighten the darker parts of life and guide the way toward Nirvana.
