= Wan Ok Phansa =

Last day of Vassa

- Official name: Thai: วันออกพรรษา
- Observed by: Lao and Thai Buddhists
- Type: Buddhist
- Frequency: Annual

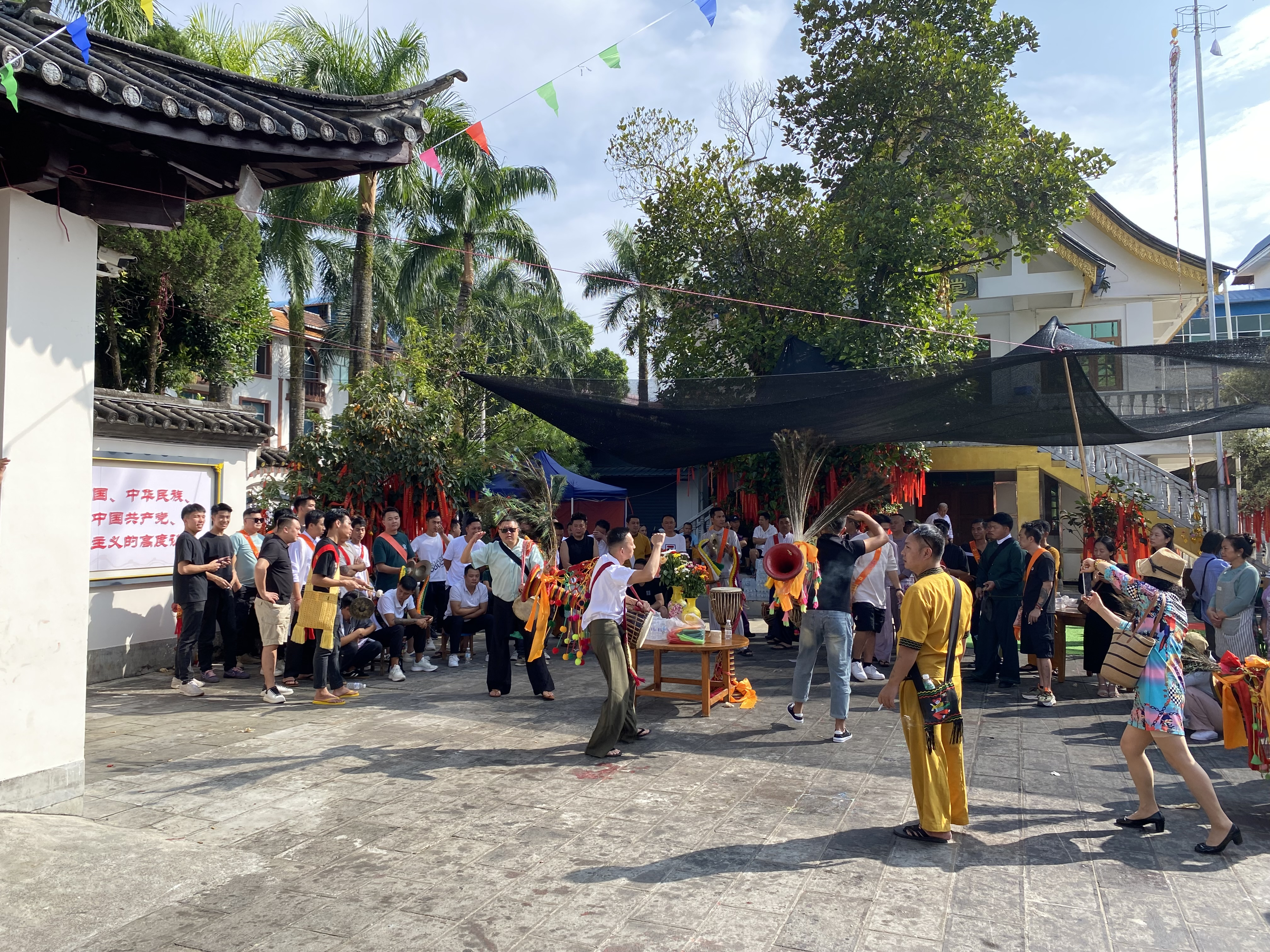
Wan Ok Phansa celebration at Puti Temple, Mangshi, China

Wan Ok Phansa (Thai: วันออกพรรษา, pronounced [wān ʔɔ̀ːk pʰān.sǎː]; literally "day of going out of Vassa", ออก in Thai meaning exit or leave) is the last day of the Thai-Lao observance of Vassa. It occurs in October, three lunar months after the beginning of Vassa, known as Wan Khao Phansa (Thai: วันเข้าพรรษา).

The day is celebrated in the Isan province by illuminated boat processions (Thai: ไหลเรือไฟ lai ruea fai [lǎj rɯ̄a fāj], Northeastern Thai: ไหลเฮือไฟ lai huea fai [lǎj hɯ́a fáj]), notably in Nakhon Phanom Province on the Mekong and in Ubon Ratchathani city on the Mun River.

The main ceremonies feature boats of 8–10 metres in length, formerly made of banana wood or bamboo but now sometimes of other materials. The boats are filled with offerings such as khao tom (glutinous rice sweets wrapped in banana leaves) and decorated on the outside with flowers, candles and lamps. The boats are launched in the evening.

Additionally, some celebrants individually launch their own, smaller, vessels. Boat races also take place around this time in many places throughout the country as a way to please the Nāga spirits. Along the Mekong River, people launch little hot air balloons, acting as lanterns, around the night of Wan Ok Phansa.

Launching the boats (or the lanterns) symbolizes one's wishes but also getting rid of unnecessary negative feelings.

== Etymology ==
"Wan" (Thai: วัน) means "day", "Ok" (Thai: ออก) means "to exit; to leave", and Phansa (Thai: พรรษา) is the Thai word for Vassa. In the Dai people region of China, Wan Ok Phansa is called Open-door Day (Chinese: 开门节, Kāimén Jié) or Exit-Vassa Day (Chinese: 出洼节, Chūwā Jié).

== Dates for Wan Ok Phansa ==
Zodiac	Date	Date	Date
Rat	27 October 1996	14 October 2008	2 October 2020
Ox	16 October 1997	4 October 2009	20 October 2021
Tiger	5 October 1998	23 October 2010	9 October 2022
Rabbit	24 October 1999	12 October 2011	28 October 2023
Dragon	13 October 2000	30 October 2012	17 October 2024
Snake	2 October 2001	19 October 2013	7 October 2025
Horse	21 October 2002	8 October 2014	26 October 2026
Goat	10 October 2003	27 October 2015	15 October 2027
Monkey	28 October 2004	16 October 2016	3 October 2028
Rooster	18 October 2005	5 October 2017	22 October 2029
Dog	7 October 2006	24 October 2018	11 October 2030
Pig	26 October 2007	13 October 2019	30 October 2031

== See also ==
- Asalha Puja
- Kathina
- Pavarana
- Uposatha
- Ubon Ratchathani Candle Festival
- Tak Bat Devo
- Chak Phra
- Festival of Floral Offerings
- Thadingyut Festival, its equivalent in Myanmar
- Tazaungdaing Festival
