= Pavāraṇā =

Buddhist ceremony

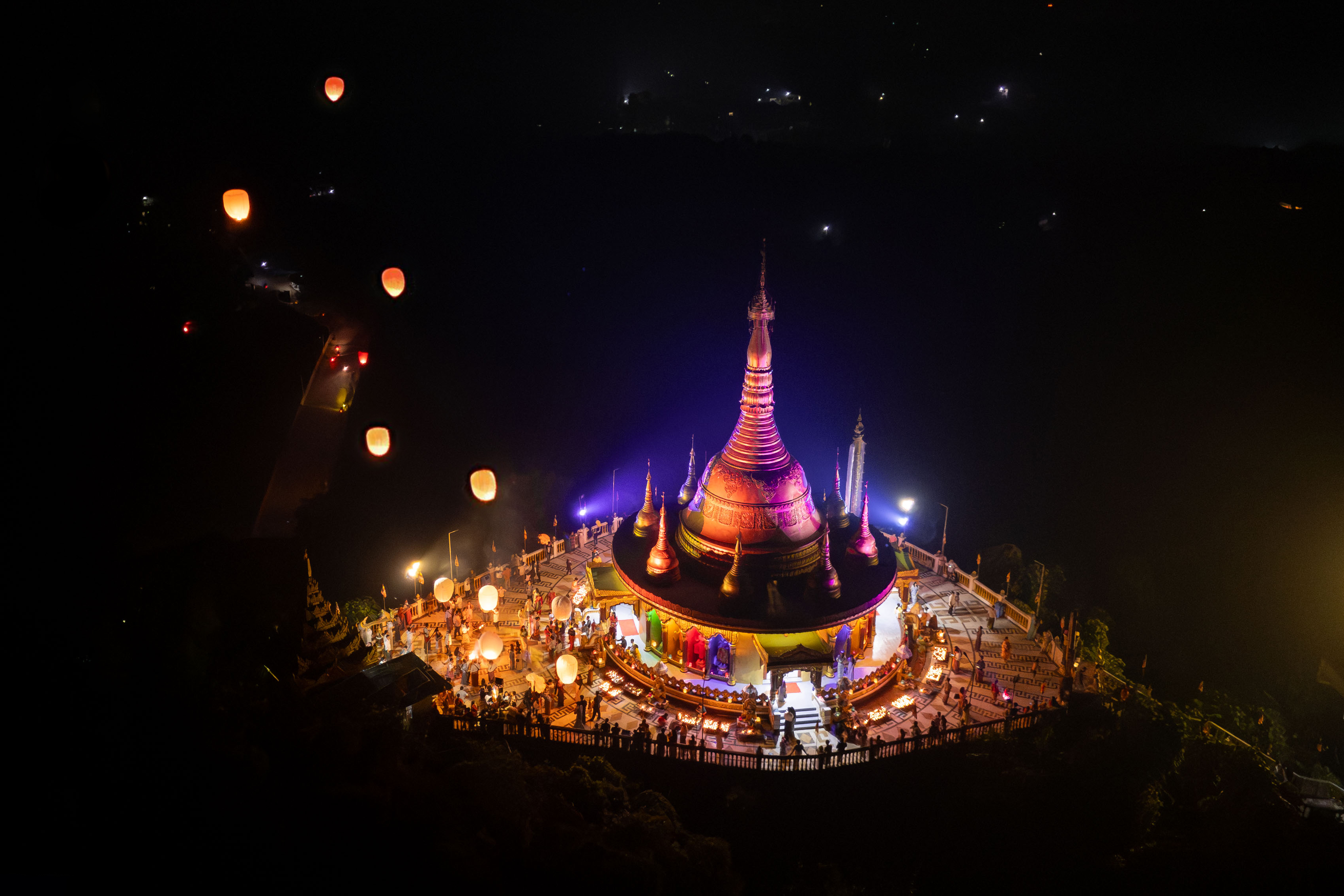
Buddhists fly lanterns during the Pavāraṇā ceremony in Bandarban, Bangladesh

Pavāraṇā (Pali; Sanskrit: Pravāraṇā) is a Buddhist ceremony held on Aashvin full moon of the lunar month. This usually occurs on the full moon of the 11th month. It marks the end of the three lunar months of Vassa, sometimes called "Buddhist Lent." The ceremony is marked in some Asian countries where Theravada Buddhism is practiced. On this day, each monk (Pali: bhikkhu) must come before the community of monks (Sangha) and atone for an offense he may have committed during the Vassa.

Mahayana Buddhists also observe Vassa, many Son/Thien monks in Korea and Vietnam observe an equivalent retreat of three months of intensive practice in one location.

== Traditions ==
Pavarana means, "inviting admonition". Monks come together to discuss the good and bad of being a monk, in addition to anything they may want to confess from the last three months.

The evening after the Pavarana ceremony, lanterns are released into the sky.

== Origins ==
In India, where Buddhism began, there is a three-month-long rainy season. According to the Vinaya (Mahavagga, Fourth Khandhaka, section I), in the time of the Buddha, once during this rainy season, a group of normally wandering monks sought shelter by co-habitating in a residence. In order to minimize potential inter-personal strife while co-habitating, the monks agreed to remain silent for the entire three months and agreed upon a non-verbal means for sharing alms.

After this rains retreat, when the Buddha learned of the monks' silence, he described such a measure as "foolish." Instead, the Buddha instituted the Pavarana Ceremony as a means for dealing with potential conflict and breaches of disciplinary rules (Patimokkha) during the vassa season. The Buddha said:

'I prescribe, O Bhikkhus, that the Bhikkhus, when they have finished their Vassa residence, hold Pavâranâ with each other in these three ways: by what [offence] has been seen, or by what has been heard, or by what is suspected. Hence it will result that you live in accord with each other, that you atone for the offences (you have committed), and that you keep the rules of discipline before your eyes.

'And you ought, O Bhikkhus, to hold Pavâranâ in this way:

'Let a learned, competent Bhikkhu proclaim the following ñatti [motion] before the Samgha: "Let the Samgha, reverend Sirs, hear me. To-day is the Pavâranâ day. If the Samgha is ready, let the Samgha hold Pavâranâ."

'Then let the senior Bhikkhu adjust his upper robe so as to cover one shoulder, sit down squatting, raise his joined hands, and say: "I pronounce my Pavâranâ, friends, before the Samgha, by what has been seen, or by what has been heard, or by what is suspected; may you speak to me, Sirs, out of compassion towards me; if I see (an offence), I will atone for it. And for the second time, &c. And for the third time I pronounce my Pavâranâ (&c., down to) if I see (an offence), I will atone for it."

'Then let (each) younger Bhikkhu adjust his upper robe . . . . (&c.)'

== See also ==
- Asalha Puja
- Māgha Pūjā
- Visakha Puja
- Uposatha
- Vassa
- Vinaya
- Wan Ok Phansa
- Thadingyut Festival
- Esala Mangallaya
- Kandy Esala Perahera
- Ubon Ratchathani Candle Festival
- List of Buddhist festivals

== Bibliography ==
- Rhys Davids, T.W. & Hermann Oldenberg (trans.) ([1881]). Vinaya Texts (Part I). Oxford:Clarendon Press. Available on-line at http://www.sacred-texts.com/bud/sbe13/sbe1313.htm. The chapter on Pavarana Day, "Fourth Khandhaka (The Parâvanâ Ceremony)," is available at http://www.sacred-texts.com/bud/sbe13/sbe1315.htm.
- Tieken, Hermann (2002). "The Buddhist Pavarana Ceremony to the Pali Vinaya". Journal of Indian Philosophy. 30 (3): 271–289. doi:10.1023/a:1016153122649. JSTOR 23496839. S2CID 169274764.
