= Thadingyut Festival =

Important Buddhist festival celebrated in Myanmar (Burma)

Thadingyut Festival သီတင်းကျွတ်ပွဲတော်
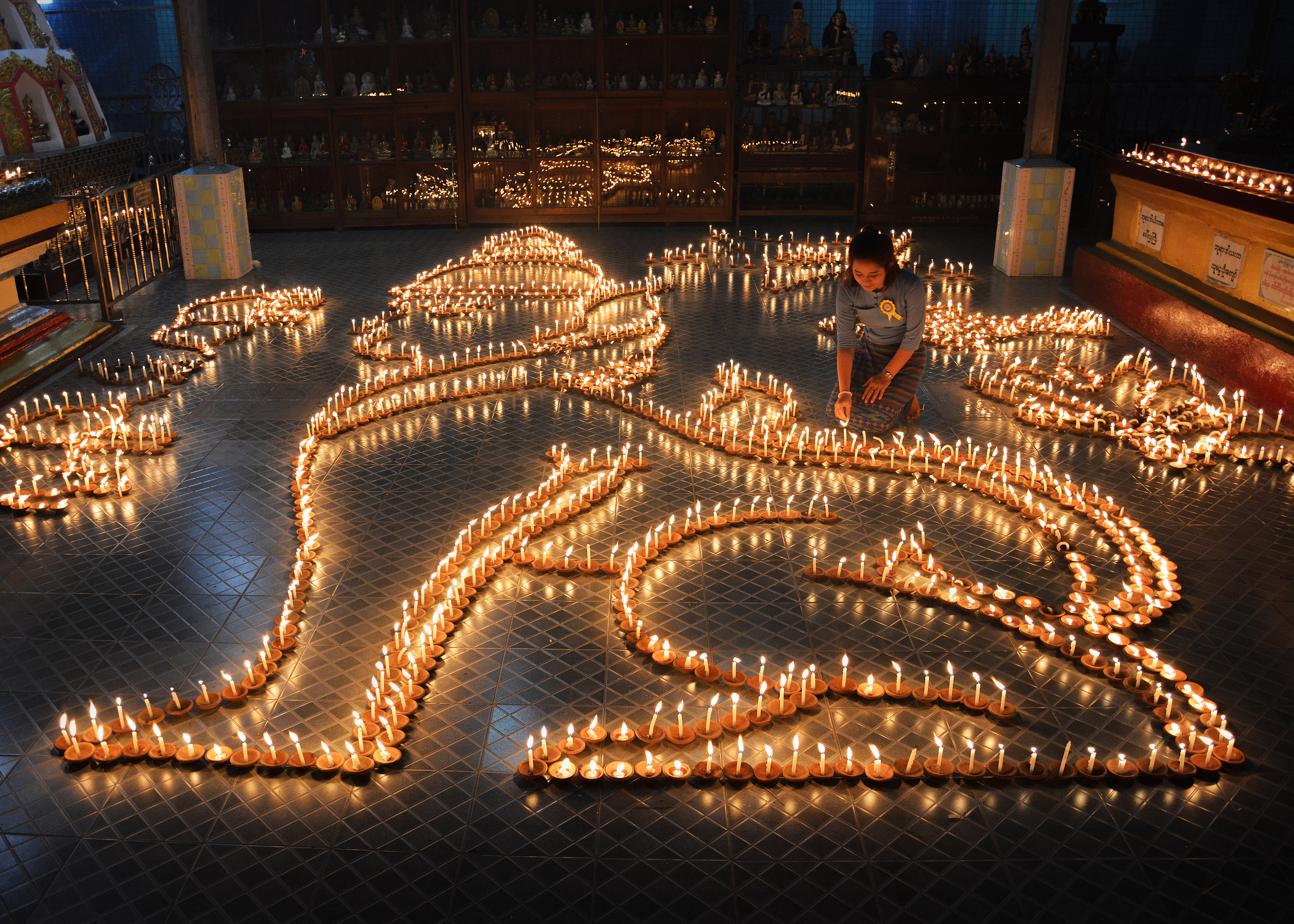
- Also called: Lighting Festival
- Observed by: Myanmar
- Type: Buddhist
- Date: Full moon day of Thadingyut
- Related to: Vap Full Moon Poya (in Sri Lanka); Wan Ok Phansa (in Thailand); Boun Suang Huea (in Laos) Lhabab Duchen (in Tibet and Bhutan)

The Thadingyut Festival (Burmese: သီတင်းကျွတ်ပွဲတော်), also known as the Lighting Festival of Myanmar, is held on the full moon day of the Burmese lunar month of Thadingyut. As a custom, it is held at the end of the Buddhist Rains Retreat (Vassa) and is the second most popular festival in Myanmar after Thingyan Festival (New Year Water Festival). Thadingyut festival is the celebration to welcome the Buddha’s descent from the heaven after he preached the Abhidhamma to his mother, Maya, who was reborn in the heaven. Thadingyut is a traditional festival, which Burmese people celebrate every year.

== Origins ==
Thadingyut, the seventh month of the Myanmar calendar, is the end of the Buddhist sabbath or Vassa. Thadingyut festival at least lasts for three days: the day before the full moon day, the full moon day (when Buddha descends from heaven) and the day after the full moon day. Buddha's mother, Maya, died seven days after the Buddha was born and then she was reborn in the Trayastrimsa Heaven as a male deva.

In order to show the gratitude for motherhood, Buddha preached Abhidhamma to that deva who was his mother for three Lenten months. When he was descending back to the mortal world, Sakra-devanam-indra, the ruler of the Trayastrimsa Heaven, ordered all the saints and devils to make three precious stairways. Those stairways were made of gold, silver and ruby. The Buddha took the middle one with the ruby. The Nats (Deva) came along by the right golden stairways and the Brahmas from the left silver stairways.

== Celebrations ==
Buddhists celebrate Thadingyut to welcome the Buddha and his disciples by enlightening and festooning the streets, houses and public buildings with colored electric bulbs or candles, which represent those three stairways. During Thadingyut Festival, there are zat pwes (Myanmar musical plays), free movie shows and stage shows on most of the streets around the country. There are also a lot of food stalls, which sell a variety of Myanmar traditional foods and shops, which sell toys, kitchen utensils, and other items on most of the streets. Sometime people just walk around in those streets just for sightseeing and have fun. Some people like to play with firecrackers and fire balloons.

During the festival days, Buddhists usually go to pagodas and monasteries to pay homage to Triple Gems, paying respect to the monks and offer foods. And some Buddhists usually fast on the full moon day. Young people usually pay respect (gadaw) to their parents, teachers, and elderly relative and offer them some fruits and other gifts. Also, while paying homage, the younger people usually ask for forgiveness from the wrong-doings they have caused upon their parents or the other elderly relatives throughout the year. Traditionally the elders tell their youngsters that they forgive any of their wrongdoings and continue to bless them with good luck and gift pocket money. It is also usual for younger siblings to pay homage to their older siblings. In return, the elder ones wish good luck for them and give them some pocket money.

== Regional traditions ==
- Dawei - Dawei locals hold a thabeik hmyaw pwe (သပိတ်မျှောပွဲ), in which alms bowls filled with offertories (e.g., flowers, water, oil lamps, candles and joss-sticks) are set adrift at sea to Shin Upagutta.
- Shwegyin - Shwegyin locals hold a mi hmyaw pwe (မီးမျှောပွဲ), in which colorful oil lanterns are set adrift into the Shwegyin River to Shin Upagutta. The tradition dates back to the Konbaung dynasty, established in 1851 (BE 1375).

== See also ==
- Gadaw
- Kathina
- Pavarana
- Uposatha
- Tazaungdaing Festival
- Wan Ok Phansa, its equivalent in Thailand
- Ubon Ratchathani Candle Festival
- Vessantara Festival
