= Asalha Puja =

Theravada Buddhist festival

Āsāḷha Pūjā
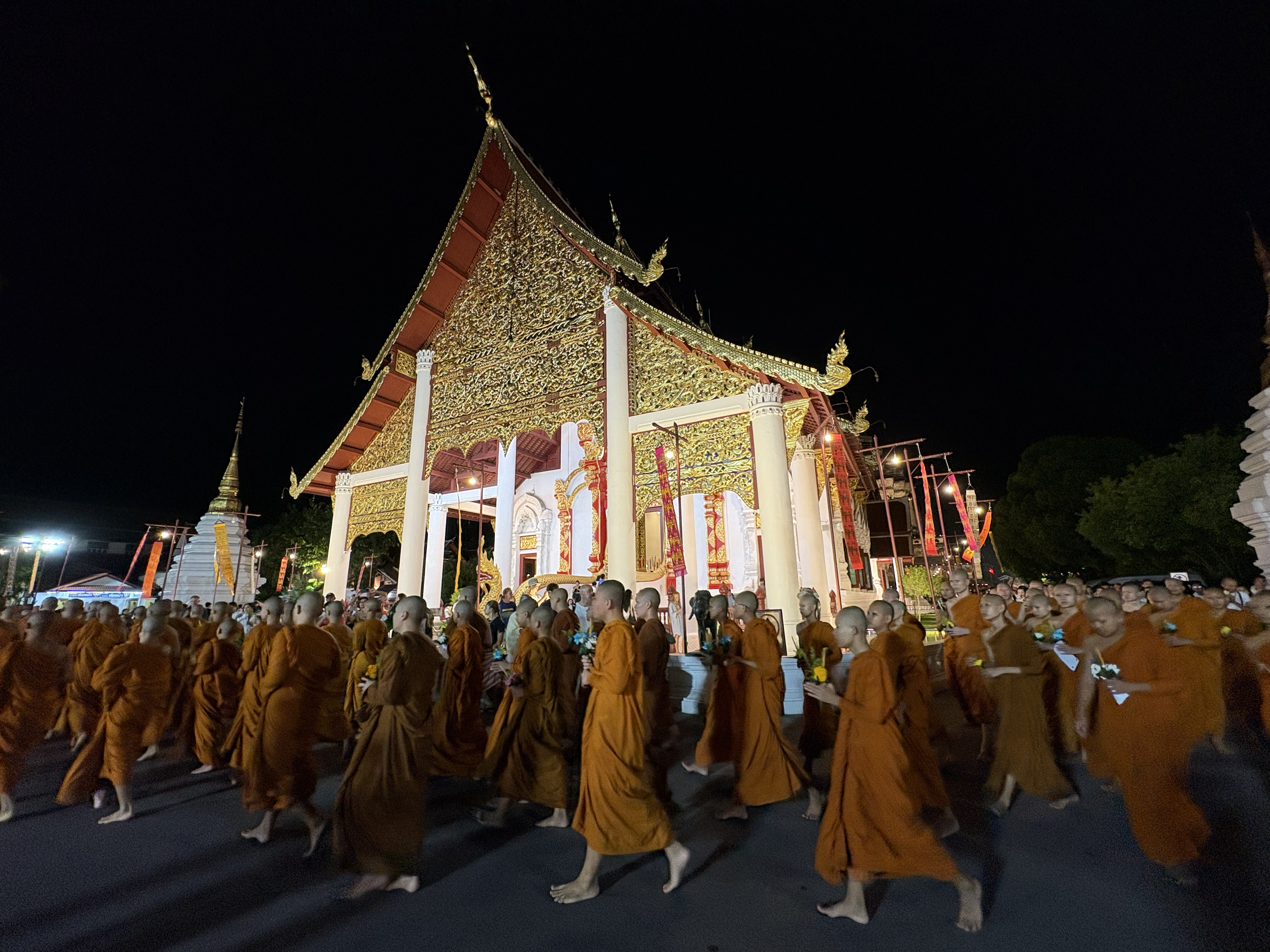
- Buddhist monks leading a circumambulation on the night of Asalha Puja in 2026 at Wat Chedi Luang Temple in Chiang Mai, Thailand
- Also called: Dhamma Day; Dharma Day; Asadha Puja; Asanha Bucha (in Thailand); Esala Poya (in Sri Lanka); Dhammasekkya Akhadaw Ne / Dhammasekkya Ne (in Burma)
- Observed by: Theravada Buddhists, especially Cambodians, Lao, Burmese, Sri Lankans, Thais, and Indonesians
- Type: Buddhist
- Date: Full moon day of the lunar month Āsādha
- Related to: Esala Mangallaya and Kandy Esala Perahera, which are held as part of Asalha Puja celebrations in Sri Lanka; Chokor Duchen Festival (in Tibet) Drukpa Tshe Zhi (in Bhutan)

Āsāḷha Pūjā is a Theravada Buddhist festival which typically takes place in July, on the full moon of the Āsādha month. It is celebrated in Indonesia, Cambodia (Khmer: ពិធីបុណ្យអាសាឡ្ហបូជា), Thailand (Thai: อาสาฬหบูชา), Sri Lanka, Laos, Myanmar (Burmese: ဓမ္မစကြာအခါတော်နေ့, lit. 'Auspicious Day of Dhammacakrā') and in other countries with Theravada Buddhist populations. In Indonesia, the festival is centered at Mendut Temple and Borobudur Temple, Central Java.

== Importance ==
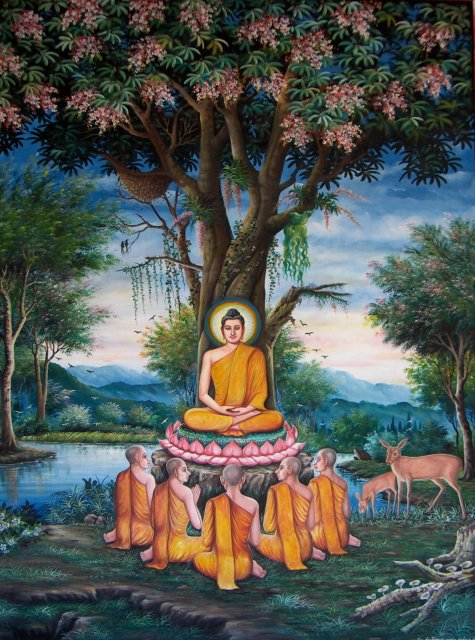
The sermon in the Deer Park as depicted at Wat Chedi Liam, Thailand

Asalha Puja, also known as Dhamma Day or Dhammacakrā Day, is one of Theravada Buddhism's most important festivals, celebrating as it does the Buddha's first sermon, the Sermon in the Deer Park at Sarnath, in which he set out to his five former associates the doctrine that had come to him following his enlightenment. This first pivotal sermon, often referred to as “setting into motion the wheel of dhamma,” is the teaching which is encapsulated for Buddhists in the Four Noble Truths: there is suffering (dukkha); suffering is caused by craving (tanha); there is a state (nibbana) beyond suffering and craving; and finally, the way to nirvana is via the Noble Eightfold Path. All the various schools and traditions of Buddhism revolve around this central doctrine.

This first sermon is not only the first structured discourse given by the Buddha after his enlightenment, it also contains the essence of all his subsequent teaching. At the end of the talk, one of the five participants recounted his understanding of what had been said and asked to be received as a disciple, a request the Buddha granted, thus establishing the first order of monks.

The day is observed by donating offerings to temples and listening to sermons. The following day is known in Thailand as Wan Khao Phansa; it is the first day of Vassa, the Theravada rains retreat.

== See also ==
- Kandy Esala Perahera
- Māgha Pūjā
- Pavarana
- Thadingyut Festival
- Ubon Ratchathani Candle Festival
- Uposatha
- Visakha Puja
- Wan Ok Phansa
