= Vassa =

Three-month Buddhist monastic rain retreat

Translations of Vassa
- English: Rains Retreat
- Burmese: ဝါတွင်း [wàdwíɰ̃]
- Chinese: 雨安居 (Pinyin: yu an ju)
- Japanese: 安居 (Rōmaji: Ango)
- Khmer: វស្សា (UNGEGN: vôssa)
- Lao: ພັນສາ, ວັດສາ [pʰán sǎː], Watsa
- Tagalog: vassa
- Tibetan: དབྱར་གནས (Yarne)
- Thai: พรรษา, วรรษา; RTGS: phansa, pronounced [pʰān.sǎː] RTGS: watsa
- Vietnamese: an cư

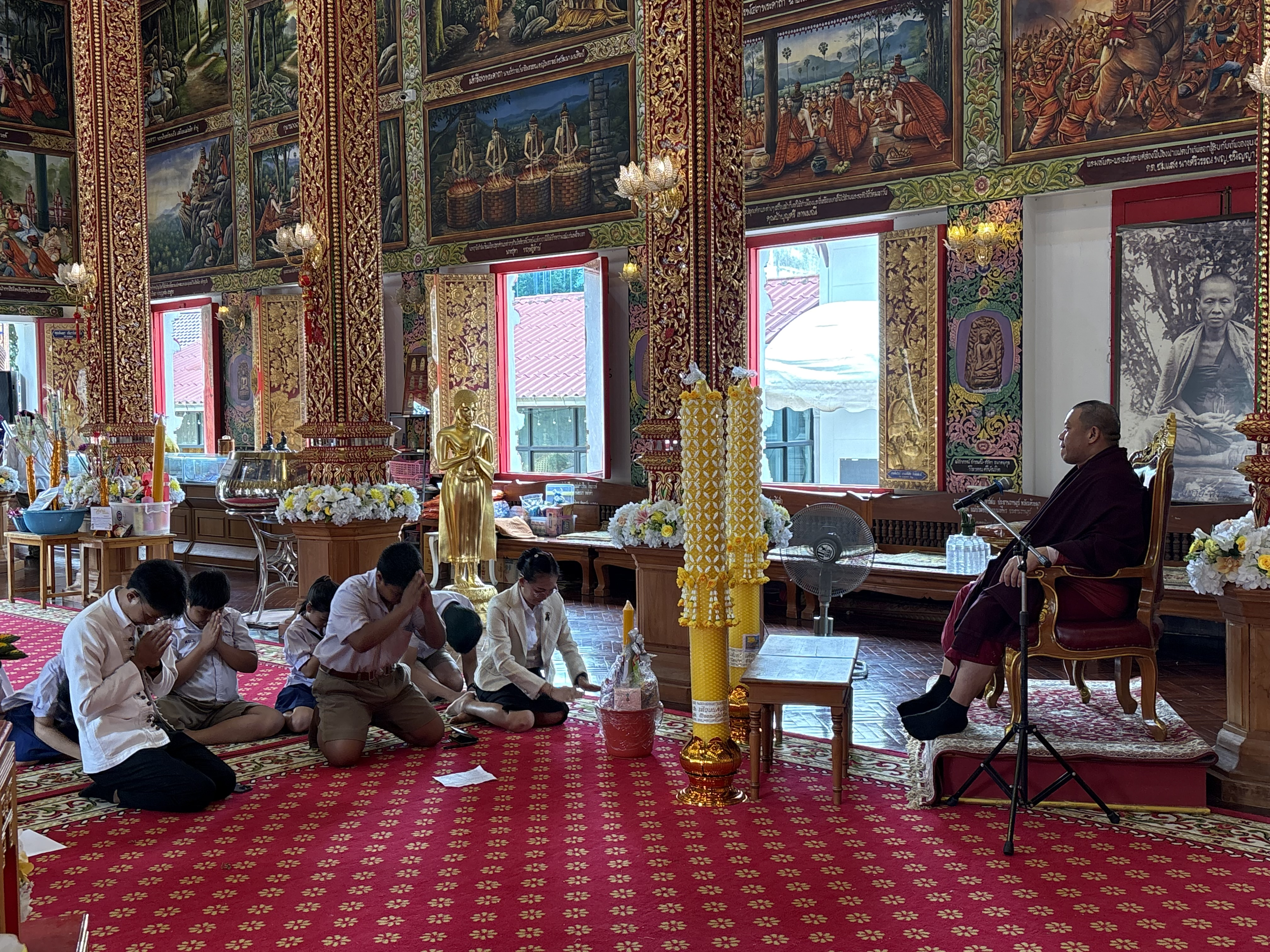
Offering of vassa candle at the beginning of the vassa, pictured here in Lamphun, Thailand

Vassa (Pali: vassa-, Sanskrit: varṣa-, both "rain") is the three-month annual retreat observed by Theravada Buddhists. Taking place during the wet season, Vassa lasts for three lunar months, usually from July onwards.

In English, Vassa is also called Rains Retreat. While Vassa is sometimes casually called "Buddhist Lent", others object to this terminology.

For the duration of Vassa, monastics remain in one place, typically a monastery or temple grounds. In some monasteries, monks dedicate the Vassa to intensive meditation. Some Buddhist lay people choose to observe Vassa by adopting more ascetic practices, such as giving up meat, alcohol, or smoking. In Thailand, the sale of alcohol is prohibited on the first (Wan Khao Phansa) and last (Wan Ok Phansa) days of Vassa. Commonly, the number of years a monk has spent in monastic life is expressed by counting the number of vassas (or rains) since ordination.

Mahayana Buddhists also observe Vassa. Vietnamese Thiền and Korean Seon monastics observe an equivalent retreat of three months of intensive practice in one location, a practice also observed in Tibetan Buddhism.

Vassa begins on the first day of the waning moon of the eighth lunar month, which is the day after Asalha Puja or Asalha Uposatha ("Dhamma day"). It ends on Pavarana, when all monastics come before the sangha and atone for any offense that might have been committed during Vassa.

Vassa is followed by Kathina, a festival in which the laity expresses gratitude to monks. Lay Buddhists bring donations to temples, especially new robes for the monks.

The Vassa tradition predates the time of Gautama Buddha. It was a long-standing custom for mendicant ascetics in India not to travel during the rainy season as they may unintentionally harm crops, insects or even themselves during their travels. Many Buddhist ascetics live in regions which lack a rainy season. Consequently, there are places where Vassa may not be typically observed.

== See also ==
- Asalha Puja
- Esala Mangallaya
- Festival of Floral Offerings
- Kathina
- Pavāraṇā
- Tazaungdaing Festival
- Thadingyut Festival
- Ubon Ratchathani Candle Festival
- Vassa candle
- Vesak
- Wan Ok Phansa
