= Ubon Ratchathani Candle Festival =

Buddhist and cultural celebration in Ubon Ratchathani, Thailand

Coordinates: 15.230273°N 104.857291°E

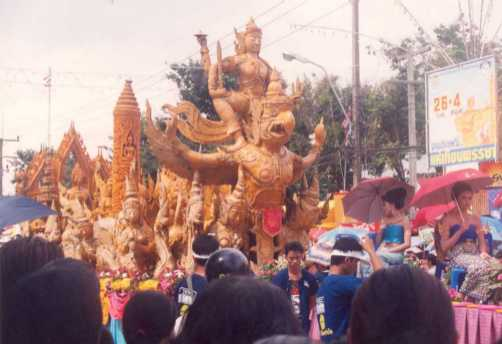
A float in the parade

The Ubon Ratchathani Candle Festival (Thai: งานประเพณีแห่เทียนเข้าพรรษาอุบลราชธานี), the most elaborate of the traditional parading of candles to wats (Thai: แห่เทียน, romanized: hae thian), is held in Ubon Ratchathani, Isan, Thailand, around the days of Asanha Puja (which commemorates Lord Buddha's first sermon) and Wan Kao Pansa (which marks the beginning of vassa).

At the start of the Lenten period, it is traditional in preparation for the rainy season for the devout to donate to items for the personal use of monks, and of candles to dispel gloom in their quarters and elsewhere within the wat. The latter is often the core event of many village celebrations, but is at its most elaborate in the Ubon Ratchathani version, which nowadays is a major event both for residents and for tourists: giant candles are paraded through the town, each representing a local temple, district or other institution. The more elaborate versions are accompanied by scenes of Hindu and Buddhist mythology sculpted in wood or plaster and coated with wax. Of course, these candles are never burned.

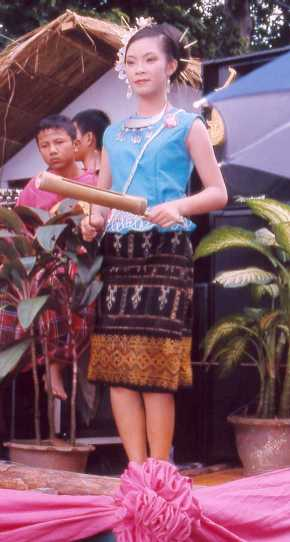
A girl wearing Isan style Sinh at Ubon Ratchathani Candle Festival, 2004

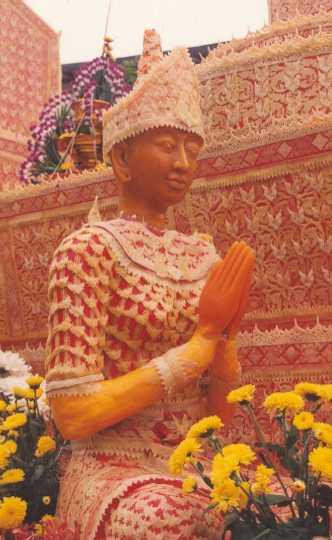
A figure on one of the floats

The candles are carved a couple of days before the procession.

On Asanha Bucha day, the candles are taken to Thung Si Mueang, a park in the middle of the city, where they are decorated and then exhibited in the evening. On the same evening, there are small processions with lighted candles at several temples.

The procession takes place on the morning of Wan Kao Pansa. The candles are paraded through the city centre on floats, accompanied by representatives of the respective institutions. These are normally dancers or musicians in traditional dress.

In addition to the above, the festival is accompanied by the usual paraphernalia of feasting and games which attend any Thai festival.

== See also ==
- Asalha Puja
- Dhammacakkappavattana Sutta
- Isan culture
- Festival of Floral Offerings
- Pavāraṇā
- History of Isan
- Wan Ok Phansa
- Vassa
