= Esala Mangallaya =

The Esala Mangallaya is a Sinhalese festival celebrated in the month of Esala, a month in the Sinhalese calendar which occurs during July and August in the Gregorian calendar. The most famous being the Esala Perahera.

== See also ==
- Esala Perahera
