= Paññananda Bhikkhu =

Paññananda Bhikkhu (Pun Padumuttaro)
- Statue of Paññananda Bhikkhu
- Title: Phra Brahmamangalacarya (2004)

Personal life
- Born: Pun Sanaecharoen; 11 May 1911 Phatthalung Province, Thailand
- Died: 10 October 2007 (aged 96) Bangkok, Thailand
- Other name: Luang Por Paññananda Bhikkhu
- Occupation: Buddhist monk

Religious life
- Religion: Buddhism
- Dharma name: Padumuttaro

Senior posting
- Teacher: Phra Charoon Karani; Buddhadasa
- Based in: Wat Chonlaprathan Rangsarit

Paññananda Bhikkhu (11 May 1911 – 10 October 2007), also romanized as Panyananda Bhikkhu, was a Thai Buddhist monk. He was a disciple of the master Buddhadasa. He was based in Wat Chonlaprathan Rangsarit from 1960 until his death.

== Name ==
Paññananda Bhikkhu (Thai: ปัญญานันทภิกขุ) is also commonly known as Luang Pho Paññananda Bhikkhu. His birth name was Pun Sanaecharoen (Thai: ปั่น เสน่ห์เจริญ), his Dhamma name (in the Pali language) was Padumuttaro (Thai: ปทุมุตฺตโร; RTGS: Pathumuttaro), and his monastic title was Phra Brahmamangalacarya (Thai: พระพรหมมังคลาจารย์).

== Early and dhamma life ==
He was born and educated in Phatthalung province. When he was age 18, he was ordained as a novice monk at Wat Upanantanaram in Ranong province. Upon reaching the age of 20, he was fully ordained as a Buddhist monk at Wat Nang Lat in Phatthalung province, with Phra Charoon Karani as his preceptor in 1931. He studied the dhamma at many Buddhist institutes in Nakhon Si Thammarat province, Ranong province and Bangkok. He met Buddhadasa in 1934, and he also resided at Suan Mokkh and studied the dhamma strictly. He studied Pali in Bangkok.

During and following World War II, he traveled throughout Thailand and in Burma, India, and Malaysia.

In 1949, he changed his residence to Wat Umong in Chiang Mai province, and he founded a charity foundation at Wat Chedi Luang. In 1954, he visited Europe and North America as a supporter of the Moral Re-Armament movement. He was based in Chiang Mai until 1960, at which point he became abbot of Wat Chonlaprathan Rangsarit.

== Death ==
He died in 2007 at Siriraj Hospital. His funeral ceremony was held ten years later.
