= Uposatha =

Buddhist day of observance

An Uposatha (Pali: uposatha; Sanskrit: Upavasatha) day is a Buddhist day of observance, in existence since the Buddha's time (600 BCE), and still being kept today by Buddhist practitioners. The Buddha taught that Uposatha was for "the cleansing of the defiled mind," resulting in inner calm and joy. On this day, both lay and ordained members of the sangha intensify their practice, deepen their knowledge and express communal commitment through millennia-old acts of lay-monastic reciprocity. On these days, the lay followers make a conscious effort to keep the Five Precepts or (as the tradition suggests) the ten precepts. It is a day for practicing the Buddha's teachings and meditation.

== Observance days ==
Depending on the culture and time period, uposatha days have been observed from two to six days each lunar month.

=== Theravada countries ===
In general, Uposatha is observed about once a week in Theravada countries in accordance with the four lunar phases: the new moon, the full moon, and the two quarter moons in between. In some communities, only the new moon and full moon are observed as uposatha days. This reflects the special role assumed by the new moon and the full moon as the two days in a month when monks (and nuns) gather for a recital of their monastic rules.

In Burmese Buddhism, Uposatha (called ဥပုသ်နေ့ ubot nei) is observed by more pious Buddhists on the following days: waxing moon (လဆန်း la hsan), full moon (လပြည့်နေ့ la pyei nei), waning moon (လဆုတ် la hsote), and new moon (လကွယ်နေ့ la kwe nei). The most common days of observance are the full moon and the new moon. In precolonial Burma, Uposatha was a legal holiday that was observed primarily in urban areas, where secular activities like business transactions came to a halt. However, since colonial rule, Sunday has replaced Uposatha as the legal day of rest. All major Burmese Buddhist holidays occur on Uposathas, namely Thingyan, the beginning of Vassa (beginning in the full moon of Waso, around July, to the full moon of Thadingyut, around October). During this period, Uposatha is more commonly observed by Buddhists than during the rest of the year. During Uposatha days, Buddhist monks at each monastery assemble and recite the Patimokkha, a concise compilation of the Vinaya.

In the Dhammayuttika order established by Mongkut prior to his enthronement as king of Thailand, the uposatha days are determined using the pakkhagaṇanā calendar. The calendar was originally proposed in response to criticisms by townspeople towards buddhist monks during Buddha' lifetime. Mongkut later revised it and proposed that the new moon, the first quarter, the full moon and the last quarter shall be determined naturally in accordance with the counting of pakkha. The calendar consists of a collection of short (14 days) and long (15 days) sorted over a long period of time (289577 days). The uposatha is observed on the eight day and the end of each pakkha.. The pakkhagaṇanā can sometimes conflict with the royal calendar used by the Greater order by up to one day. The royal calendar assigns 30 days for even months and 29 days for odd months. The waxing moon pakkhas always have 15 days, while the waning moon pakkhas can have 14 or 15 days.

=== Mahayana countries ===
In Mahayana countries that use the Chinese calendar, the Uposatha days are observed ten times a month, on the 1st, 8th, 14th, 15th, 18th, 23rd, 24th and final three days of each lunar month. Alternatively, one can only observe Uposatha days six times a month; on the 8th, 14th, 15th, 23rd and final two days of each lunar month. In Japan, these ten days are known as jū sainichi (十斎日, Ten Days of Fasting), while the six day practice is known as roku sainichi (六斎日, Six Days of Fasting).

=== Names of full moon Uposatha days ===
The Pali names of the uposatha days are based on the Sanskrit names of the nakṣatra (Pali: nakkhatta), the constellations or lunar mansions through which the moon passes within a lunar month.

Full Moon Uposatha Day Names
Associated Month	Pali	Sanskrit	Burmese	Khmer	Sinhala	Thai	Tamil	Days
January	Phussa	Puṣya	Pyatho (ပြာသို)	Buss (បុស្ស)	Duruthu (දුරුතු)	Pusaya (ปุศยะ)	Thai (தை)	30
February	Māgha	Māgha	Tabodwe (တပို့တွဲ)	Meak (មាឃ)	Navam (නවම්)	Makha (มาฆะ)	Maasi (மாசி)	29
March	Phagguṇa	Phalguṇa	Tabaung (တပေါင်း)	Phalkun (ផល្គុន)	Medin/Maedhin (මැදින්)	Pholkuni (ผัคคุณะ)	Panguni (பங்குனி)	30
April	Citta	Chitrā	Tagu (တန်ခူး)	Chaet (ចេត្រ)	Bak (බක්)	Chittra (จิตรา)	Chithirai (சித்திரை)	29
May	Visākhā	Viśākhā	Kason (ကဆုန်)	Pisak (ពិសាខ)	Vesak (වෙසක්)	Visakha (วิสาขะ)	Vaikasi (வைகாசி)	30
June	Jeṭṭhā	Jyeṣṭha	Nayon (နယုန်)	Ches (ជេស្ឋ)	Poson (පොසොන්)	Chetta (เชษฐา)	Aani (ஆனி)	29/30
July	Āsāḷhā	Aṣāḍhā	Waso (ဝါဆို)	Asath (អាសាឍ)	Esala/Aesala (ඇසළ)	Asarnha (อาสาฬหะ)	Aadi (ஆடி)	30
August	Sāvana	Śrāvaṇa	Wagaung (ဝါခေါင်)	Srap (ស្រាពណ៍)	Nikini (නිකිණි)	Savana (สาวนะ)	Aavani (ஆவணி)	29
September	Poṭṭhapāda	Proṣṭhapāda/Bhādrapadā	Tawthalin (တော်သလင်း)	Phuttrobot (ភទ្របទ)	Binara (බිනර)	Phattarapratha (ภัทรบท)	Purattasi (புரட்டாசி)	30
October	Assayuja	Aśvayuja/Aśvinī	Thadingyut (သီတင်းကျွတ်)	Assoch (អស្សុជ)	Vap (වප්)	Assavani (อัศวยุช/อัศวิน)	Aippasi (ஐப்பசி)	29
November	Kattikā	Kāṛttikā	Tazaungmon (တန်ဆောင်မုန်း)	Katdeuk (កត្តិក)	Il (ඉල්)	Krittika (กฤติกา)	Karthigai (கார்த்திகை)	30
December	Māgasira	Māṛgaśiras	Natdaw (နတ်တော်)	Meukesae (មិគសិរ)	Unduvap (උඳුවප්)	Maruekasira (มฤคศิระ/มิคสิระ)	Margazhi (மார்கழி)	29

== History ==
The word "Uposatha" derives from the Muluposatha Sutta (AN 3.70), in which a lay woman named Visakha, visited the Lord Buddha and says she is observing the Uposatha day. The Lord Buddha replies that there are different Uposatha days, then proceeds to tell her the correct version of the Uposatha day, the Uposatha of the Noble Disciples.

== Practice ==
=== Lay practice ===
On each uposatha day, devout Upāsaka and Upāsikā practice the Eight Precepts, perhaps echoing the Buddha's teaching that laypeople should "imitate" arhats on Uposatha days. The first five of the eight precepts are similar to the five precepts, that is, to refrain from killing living beings, stealing, wrong speech and to abstain from intoxicating drink or drugs, but the third precept is abstinence of all sexual activity instead of refraining from sexual offenses. The eight precepts are similar to the ten precepts observed by novice monks, except that the seventh and eighth precepts for the novices are combined, the ninth novice precept becomes the eighth, and the tenth novice precept (non-acceptance of gold and silver, use of money) is excluded as being impracticable for a lay person. Thus, the final three precepts are to abstain from eating at the wrong time (after midday); to abstain from entertainment such as dancing, singing, music, watching shows, as well as to abstain from wearing garlands, perfumes, cosmetics, and personal adornments; and to abstain from luxurious seats and beds.

For lay practitioners who live near a Buddhist temple, the uposatha is an opportunity for them to visit it, make offerings, listen to sermons by monks and participate in meditation sessions. For lay practitioners unable to participate in the events of a local monastery, the uposatha is a time to intensify one's own meditation and Dhamma practice, for instance, meditating an extra session or for a longer time, reading or chanting special Buddhist texts, recollecting or giving in some special way.

Presently, the uposatha vows are mostly associated with Theravāda Buddhism in South and Southeast Asia, but it was a widespread practice in China as well, and is still practiced.

The eight precepts are meant to give lay people an impression of what it means to live as a monastic, and the precepts "may function as the thin end of a wedge for attracting some to monastic life." The objective of the eight precepts is different from the five in that they are less moral in nature, but more focused on developing meditative concentration, and preventing distractions. Among the eight precepts, the third precept is about maintaining chastity. Buddhist tradition therefore requires lay people to be chaste on observance days, which is similar to the historical Indian tradition of being chaste on parvan days. As for the sixth rule, this means not having food after midday, in imitation of a nearly identical rule for monks. Fluids are allowed. Taiwanese physician Ming-Jun Hung and his co-authors have analyzed early and medieval Chinese Buddhist Texts and argue that the main purposes of the half-day fast is to lessen desire, improve fitness and strength, and decrease sleepiness. Historically, Chinese Buddhists have interpreted the eight precepts as including vegetarianism.

The seventh precept is sometimes also interpreted to mean not wearing colorful clothes, which has led to a tradition for people to wear plain white when observing the eight precepts. This does not necessarily mean, however, that a Buddhist devotee dressed in white is observing the eight precepts all the time. As for the eighth precept, not sitting or sleeping on luxurious seats or beds, this usually comes down to sleeping on a mat on the floor. Though not specified in the precepts themselves, in Thailand and China, people observing the precepts usually stay in the temple overnight. This is to prevent temptations at home which break the eight precepts, and helps foster the community effort in upholding the precepts. (Note: See Terwiel (2012, p. 203) and Harvey (2000, p. 87). Only Harvey mentions China, and the sitting.)

=== Monastic practice ===
On the new-moon and full-moon uposatha, in monasteries where there are four or more bhikkhus, the local Sangha will recite the Patimokkha. Before the recitation starts, the monks will confess any violations of the disciplinary rules to another monk or to the Sangha. Depending on the speed of the Patimokkha chanter (one of the monks), the recitation may take from 30 minutes to over an hour. Depending on the monastery, lay people may or may not be allowed to attend.

=== Communal reciprocity ===
Describing his experience of Uposatha days in Thailand, Khantipalo (1982a) writes:

Early in the morning lay people give almsfood to the bhikkhus who may be walking on almsround, invited to a layman's house, or the lay people may take the food to the monastery. Usually lay people do not eat before serving their food to the bhikkhus and they may eat only once that day.... Before the meal the laity request the Eight Precepts [from the bhikkhus] ..., which they promise to undertake for a day and night. It is usual for lay people to go to the local monastery and to spend all day and night there.... [In monasteries where] there is more study, [lay people] will hear as many as three or four discourses on Dhamma delivered by senior bhikkhus and they will have books to read and perhaps classes on Abhidhamma to attend.... In a meditation monastery ..., most of their time will be spent mindfully employed – walking and seated meditation with some time given to helping the bhikkhus with their daily duties. So the whole of this day and night (and enthusiastic lay people restrict their sleep) is given over to Dhamma.

== Special Uposatha days ==
In Thailand five full-moon Uposatha days are of special significance and are called puja:

- Visakha Puja or Visakha Uposatha or Vesak ("Buddha Day") is the most sacred Buddhist holiday. It is the anniversary of the Buddha's birth, awakening and parinibbana.
- Asalha Puja or Asalha Uposatha ("Dhamma Day") is the anniversary of the Buddha's delivering his first discourse, which is collected as the Dhammacakkappavattana Sutta. The three-month-long Vassa retreat starts the following day.
- Pavarana is the end of the Rains Retreat residence during which time each monk atones before the Sangha for any offense they may have committed.
- Anapanasati Day is the anniversary of the Buddha's delivering the Anapanasati Sutta. This event is not connected to an Uposatha (Poya) day in Sri Lanka and perhaps is particular to Thailand.
- Magha Puja or Magha Uposatha ("Sangha Day") is the anniversary of the assembling of 1250 monks in the Buddha's presence during which time he delivered the "Ovada-Patimokkha Gatha."

In Sri Lanka, three full moon Uposatha or Poya days are of special significance.

- Vesak Poya, which is described above.
- Poson Poya corresponds to the Jeṭṭhā uposatha, which falls in June. It is of special significance in Sri Lanka because the monk Mahinda, Asoka's son, officially introduced Buddhism to Sri Lanka on this day in the 3rd century B.C.
- Esala Poya corresponds to Āsāḷhā uposatha, the full moon of July, and is described above. This day has special significance in Sri Lanka because it was the day that 56 nobles, headed by Prince Ariṭṭha, became the first Sri Lankans to be fully ordained as bhikkhus at Cetiyagiri in Mihintale by Mahinda and his companions. It therefore marks the founding of the Sri Lankan Bhikkhu Sangha.

In Tibet and Bhutan, there are four full moon Uposatha days that are of importance

- Chotrul Duchen
- Saga Dawa Duchen
- Chokhor Duchen
- Lhabab Duchen

In China, Japan, Korea, the Philippines and Vietnam there are certain full moon Uposatha days of importance.

- First Full Moon Festival, which is celebrated in Buddhist temples and also acknowledges the end of the Lunar New Year.
- Buddha's Birthday/Vesak

== See also ==
- Buddhist calendar
- Buddhist devotion
- Dhammacakkappavattana Sutta
- Dhammika Sutta
- Eight Precepts
- Five Precepts
- List of Buddhist festivals
- Householder (Buddhism)
- Patimokkha
- Poya (Sri Lankan full-moon holiday)
- Thai lunar calendar
- Vassa

== Bibliography ==
- Buddhadatta Mahathera, A. P. (2002). Concise Pali-English Dictionary. Delhi:Motilal Banarsidass. ISBN 81-208-0605-0.
- Bullitt, John T. (2005). Uposatha Observance Days. Available on-line at http://www.accesstoinsight.org/ptf/dhamma/sila/uposatha.html.
- Dhammayut Order in the United States of America (1994). A Chanting Guide. Available on-line at http://www.accesstoinsight.org/lib/authors/dhammayut/chanting.html.
- Buswell, Robert E. Jr.; Lopez, Donald S. Jr. (2013), Princeton Dictionary of Buddhism (PDF), Princeton University Press, ISBN 978-0-691-15786-3, archived (PDF) from the original on 12 June 2018
- Dutt, Sukumar (1988). Buddhist Monks and Monasteries of India: Their History and Their Contribution to Indian Culture. Motilal Banarsidass. ISBN 978-81-208-0498-2.
- Getz, D.A. (2004), "Precepts", in Buswell, Robert E. (ed.), Encyclopedia of Buddhism, Macmillan Reference USA, Thomson Gale, pp. 673–5, ISBN 978-0-02-865720-2
- Harvey, Peter (1990). An introduction to Buddhism: Teachings, history and practices (1st ed.), Cambridge University Press. ISBN 0-521-31333-3.
- Harvey, Peter (2000), An Introduction to Buddhist Ethics: Foundations, Values and Issues (PDF), Cambridge University Press, ISBN 978-0-511-07584-1, archived from the original (PDF) on 2019-04-12
- Hung, Ming-jung; Kuo, Cheng-deng; Chen, Gau-yang (July 2002), 佛教的「過午不食」 [No-food-after-midday precept [sic] (Vikala Bhojana Veramani) in Buddhism], Buddhism and Science, 3 (2): 51–64, ISSN 1607-2952, archived from the original on 4 December 2018
- Kariyawasam, A.G.S. (1995). Buddhist Ceremonies and Rituals of Sri Lanka (The Wheel Publication No. 402/404). Kandy, Sri Lanka: Buddhist Publication Society. Retrieved 2007-10-22 from "Access to Insight" (1996 transcription) at http://www.accesstoinsight.org/lib/authors/kariyawasam/wheel402.html.
- Keown, Damien (2004), A Dictionary of Buddhism, Oxford University Press, ISBN 978-0-19-157917-2
- Khantipalo, Bhikkhu (1982a). Lay Buddhist Practice: The Shrine Room, Uposatha Day, Rains Residence (The Wheel No. 206/207). Kandy, Sri Lanka:Buddhist Publication Society. Also transcribed (1995) and available on-line at http://www.accesstoinsight.org/lib/authors/khantipalo/wheel206.html.
- Khantipalo, Bhikkhu (trans.) (1982b). Visakhuposatha Sutta: The Discourse to Visakha on the Uposatha with the Eight Practices [AN 8.43]. Available on-line at http://www.accesstoinsight.org/tipitaka/an/an08/an08.043.khan.html.
- Mahasi Sayadaw (undated). Practical Vipassana Exercises. Buddha Dharma Education Association. Available on-line at http://www.buddhanet.net/pdf_file/mahasit1.pdf.
- Ñanavara Thera (Somdet Phra Buddhaghosacariya) & Bhikkhu Kantasilo (trans.) (1993). Uposatha Sila: The Eight-Precept Observance. Thailand:The Office of the Secretary of the Supreme Patriarch. Available on-line at http://www.accesstoinsight.org/lib/authors/nanavara/uposatha.html.
- Narada Thera (trans.) (1985). Maha-mangala Sutta: Blessings [Sn 2.4]. Available on-line at http://www.accesstoinsight.org/tipitaka/kn/snp/snp.2.04.nara.html.
- Nyanaponika Thera and Bhikkhu Bodhi (trans. and ed.) (1999). Numerical Discourses of the Buddha: An Anthology of Suttas from the Anguttara Nikaya. Walnut Creek, CA: Altamira Press. ISBN 0-7425-0405-0.
- Piyadassi Thera (trans.) (1999a). Karaniya Metta Sutta: The Discourse on Loving-kindness [Sn 1.8]. Available on-line at http://www.accesstoinsight.org/tipitaka/kn/snp/snp.1.08.piya.html.
- Piyadassi Thera (trans.) (1999b). Ratana Sutta: The Jewel Discourse [Sn 2.1]. Available on-line at http://www.accesstoinsight.org/tipitaka/kn/snp/snp.2.01.piya.html.
- Rhys Davids, T.W. & Hermann Oldenberg (trans.) ([1881]). Vinaya Texts (Part I). Oxford:Clarendon Press. Available on-line at http://www.sacred-texts.com/bud/sbe13/sbe1313.htm. The chapter on the Uposatha, "Second Khandhaka (The Uposatha Ceremony, and the Pâtimokkha)," is available at http://www.sacred-texts.com/bud/sbe13/sbe1313.htm. The chapter on Pavarana Day, "Fourth Khandhaka (The Parâvanâ Ceremony)," is available at http://www.sacred-texts.com/bud/sbe13/sbe1315.htm.
- Rhys Davids, T.W., and William Stede, The Pali Text Society's Pali-English Dictionary, 1921–25. Pali Text Society, London : Chipstead. The entry on "Uposatha" is available on-line at. A general on-line search engine for the PED is available at http://dsal.uchicago.edu/dictionaries/pali/.
- Tachibana, S. (1992), The Ethics of Buddhism, Curzon Press, ISBN 978-0-7007-0230-5
- Terwiel, Barend Jan (2012), Monks and Magic: Revisiting a Classic Study of Religious Ceremonies in Thailand (PDF), Nordic Institute of Asian Studies, ISBN 9788776941017, archived (PDF) from the original on 19 August 2018
- Thanissaro Bhikkhu (trans.) (1993). Dhammacakkappavattana Sutta: Setting the Wheel of Dhamma in Motion [SN 56.11]. Available on-line at http://www.accesstoinsight.org/tipitaka/sn/sn56/sn56.011.than.html.
- Thanissaro Bhikkhu (trans.) (1997a). Buddhavagga: Awakened [ Dhp XIV]. Available on-line at http://www.accesstoinsight.org/tipitaka/kn/dhp/dhp.14.than.html.
- Thanissaro Bhikkhu (trans.) (1997b). Muluposatha Sutta: The Roots of the Uposatha [AN 3.70]. Available on-line at http://www.accesstoinsight.org/tipitaka/an/an03/an03.070.than.html.
- Thanissaro, Bhikkhu (trans.) (1999). The Ten Recollections: A Study Guide. Available on-line at http://www.accesstoinsight.org/lib/study/recollections.html.
- Thanissaro, Bhikkhu (trans.) (2006). Anapanasati Sutta: Mindfulness of Breathing [MN 118]. Available on-line at http://www.accesstoinsight.org/tipitaka/mn/mn.118.than.html.
- Watson, Burton (1988), "Buddhism in the Poetry of Po Chü-i", The Eastern Buddhist, 21 (1): 1–22, JSTOR 44361818
- Whitaker, J.S.; Smith, D. (2018), "Ethics, Meditation and Wisdom", in Cozort, Daniel; Shields, James Mark (eds.), The Oxford Handbook of Buddhist Ethics, Oxford University Press, ISBN 978-0-19-106317-6
