= Poya =

Sri Lankan holiday

Poya is the name given to the Lunar monthly Buddhist holiday of Uposatha in Sri Lanka, where it is a civil and bank holiday. When earth makes Full Orbit of moon is normally considered as the poya day in Sri Lanka every month.

== Poya ==
A Poya occurs every full moon. Uposatha is important to Buddhists all around the world, who have adopted the lunar calendar for their religious observances. Owing to the moon's fullness of size as well as its effulgence, the full moon day is treated as the most auspicious of the four lunar phases occurring once every lunar month (29.5 days) and thus marked by a holiday.

Every full moon day is known as a Poya in the Sinhala language; this is when a practicing Sri Lankan Buddhist visits a temple for religious observances. There are 13 or 14 Poyas per year. The term poya is derived from the Pali and Sanskrit word uposatha (from upa + vas "to fast"), primarily signifying "fast day". Generally shops and businesses are closed on Poya days, and the sale of alcohol and meat is forbidden.

The Poya Day in each month generally falls on the Gregorian date of the full moon but occasionally it falls a day on either side. The designated Poya Day is based on the phase of the moon at the Madhyahana time of day (the variant of Madhyahana which only covers two ghatikas).

| Month | Poya Name | Full Moon Poya days of 2023 |
|---|---|---|
| January | Duruthu Poya | 6th |
| February | Navam Poya | 5th |
| March | Medin Poya | 6th |
| April | Bak Poya | 6th |
| May | Vesak Poya | 5th |
| June | Poson Poya | 3rd |
| July | Adhi Esala Poya | 3rd |
| August | Esala Poya | 1st |
| August | Nikini Poya | 30th |
| September | Binara Poya | 29th |
| October | Vap Poya | 28th |
| November | Ill Poya | 26th |
| December | Unduvap Poya | 26th |

If a month has two Poya days, the name of the second one will be preceded by "Adhi" ("extra" in Sinhala) as in "Adhi Vesak", "Adhi Poson", etc.

== See also ==
- List of Buddhist festivals
- Mid-Autumn Festival, similar Chinese/Vietnamese Buddhist festival occurring on the day of the eighth lunar month full moon.
- Tshechu, similar concept in Bhutan however revolves around the tenth day of a lunar month.
