= Wat Umong =

Buddhist temple in Chiang Mai, Thailand

- วัดอุโมงค์
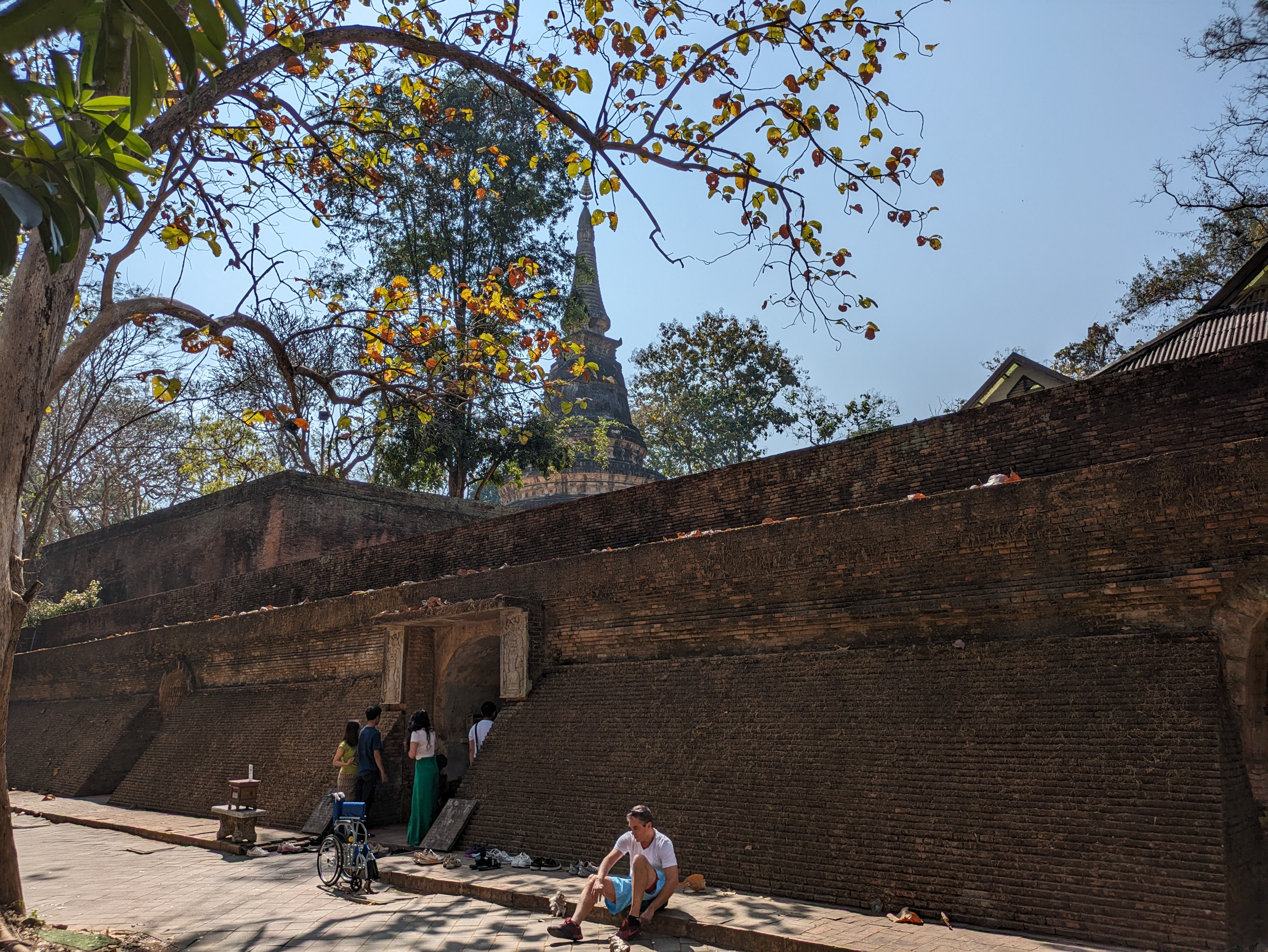
- Wat Umong in 2024

Religion
- Affiliation: Buddhism
- Sect: Theravada Buddhism

Location
- Location: Mueang Chiang Mai district, Chiang Mai Province
- Country: Thailand
- Interactive map of Wat Umong
- Coordinates: 18°46′59.46″N 98°57′4.71″E

Architecture
- Established: 1297

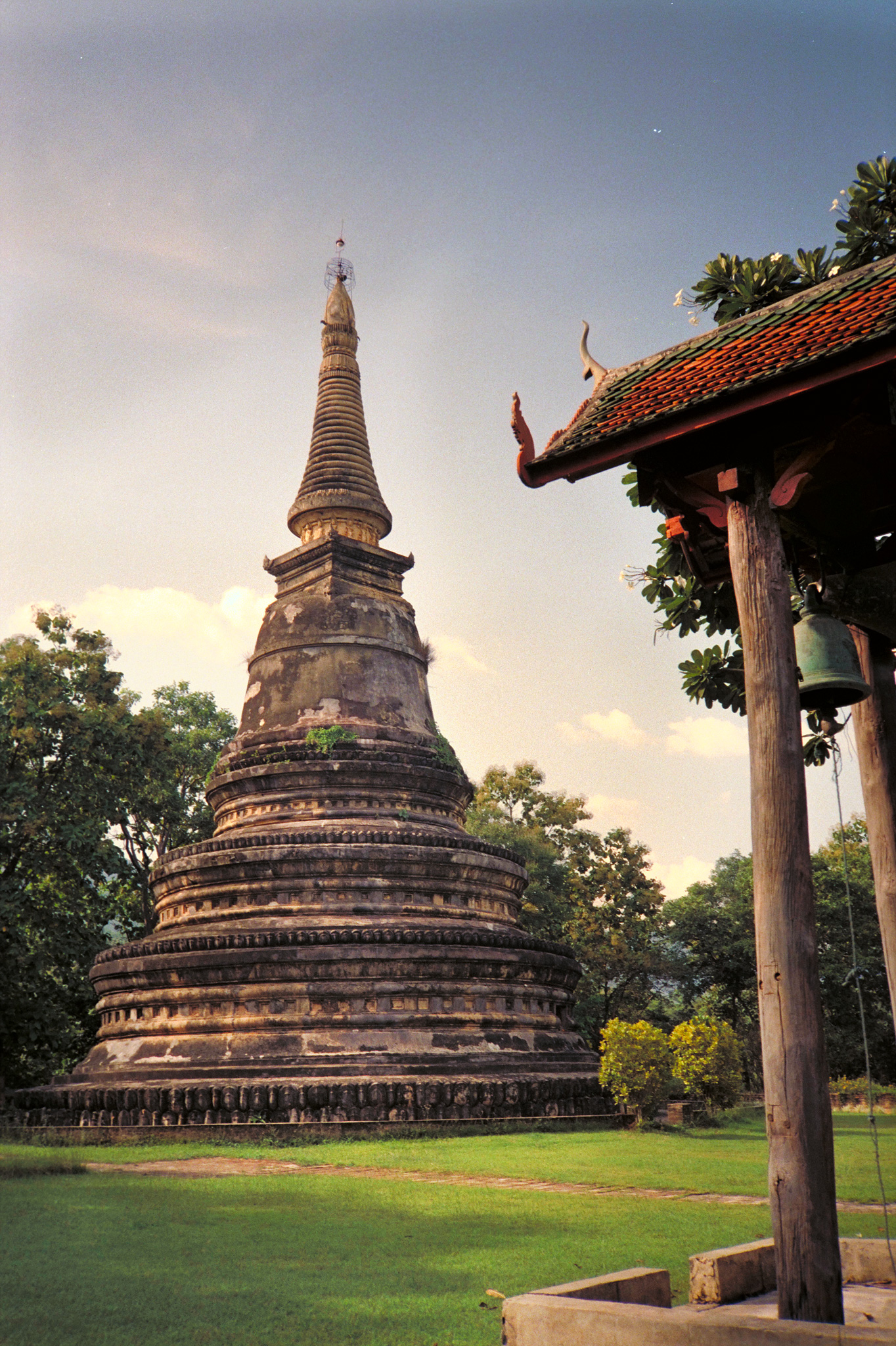
The Chedi of Wat Umong

Wat Umong, or Wat Umong Suan Puthatham (Northern Thai: ᩅᩢ᩠ᨯᩏᩰᨾᨦ᩠ᨣ᩺; Thai: วัดอุโมงค์) is a 700-year-old Buddhist temple in Chiang Mai, Thailand.

== Location ==
Wat Umong is located against the mountains of Doi Suthep and is about 1 km south of the main campus of Chiang Mai University. The wat occupies a tranquil setting and a small open zoo is stationed behind it.

== History ==
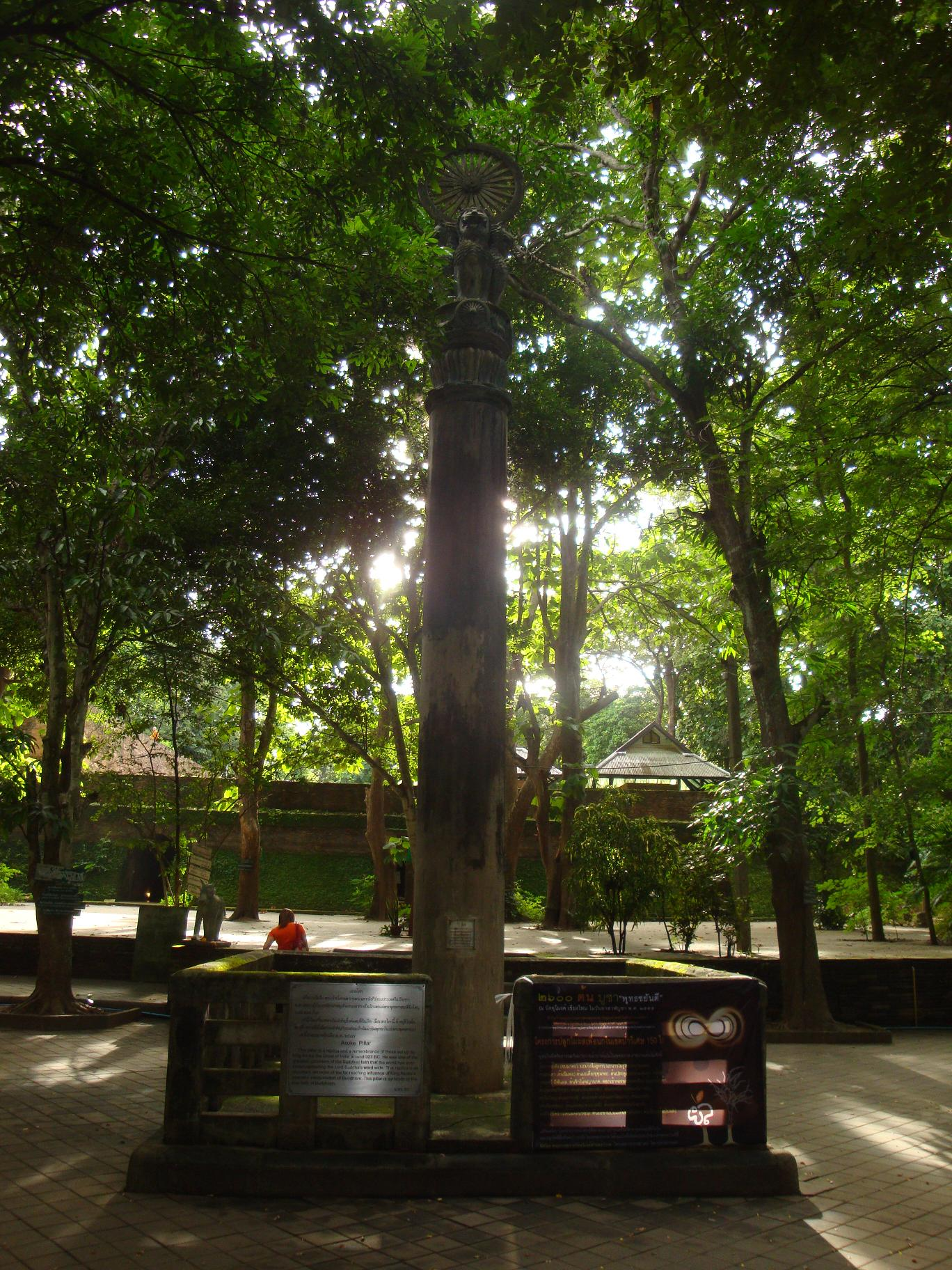
Replica of Ashok pillar, said to date 13th century. It shows the establishment of buddhism by Lanna Dynasty's King Mangrai in northern Thailand. According to historian Nayanjot Lahiri, it actually dates to a few decades ago.

Wat Umong was founded by Mangrai, gave it the name “Wat Welukadtharam” (Thai: วัดเวฬุกัฏฐาราม; lit. 'Temple of the Eleven Bamboo Clumps') because it was located in a bamboo forest at the foot of Doi Suthep. Mangrai established this monastery specifically as a residence for a group of monks invited from Sri Lanka.

Later, during the reign of Kue Na (1355–1385), he invited Maha Thera Chan, a highly revered monk, to reside at this temple. The king also restored the monastery by repairing the stupa and constructing walking tunnels in all four directions. He then bestowed a new name, “Wat Umong Thera Chan,” after the Wat Umong Maha Thera Chan, where the monk had previously lived.

During the period when Chiang Mai was under Burmese rule, Wat Umong became abandoned and had no resident monks. In 1949, Chao Chuen Siroros established a meditation center there, inspired by Buddhadasa Bhikkhu’s Suan Mokkh, and gave the monastery a new name, “Wat Umong (Suan Phutthatham)”, which it continues to use today.

In 2024, the Fine Arts Department restored several 400–500-year-old giant statues within the temple by coating them with new plaster and reshaping them. This led to widespread criticism that the restoration had caused the loss of their historical authenticity and obliterated the craftsmanship of ancient artisans.

== Structure and layout ==
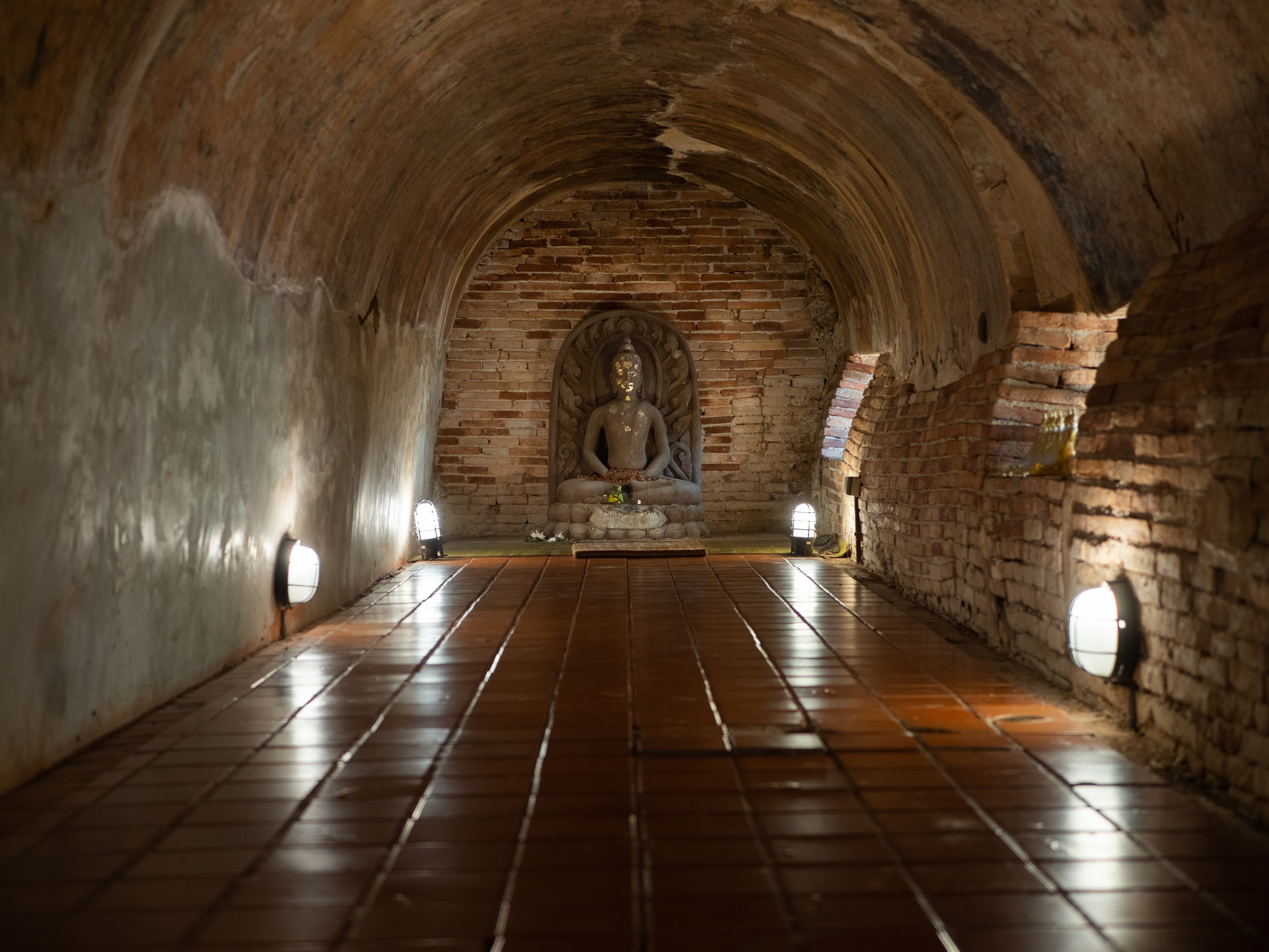
End of a tunnel at Wat Umong

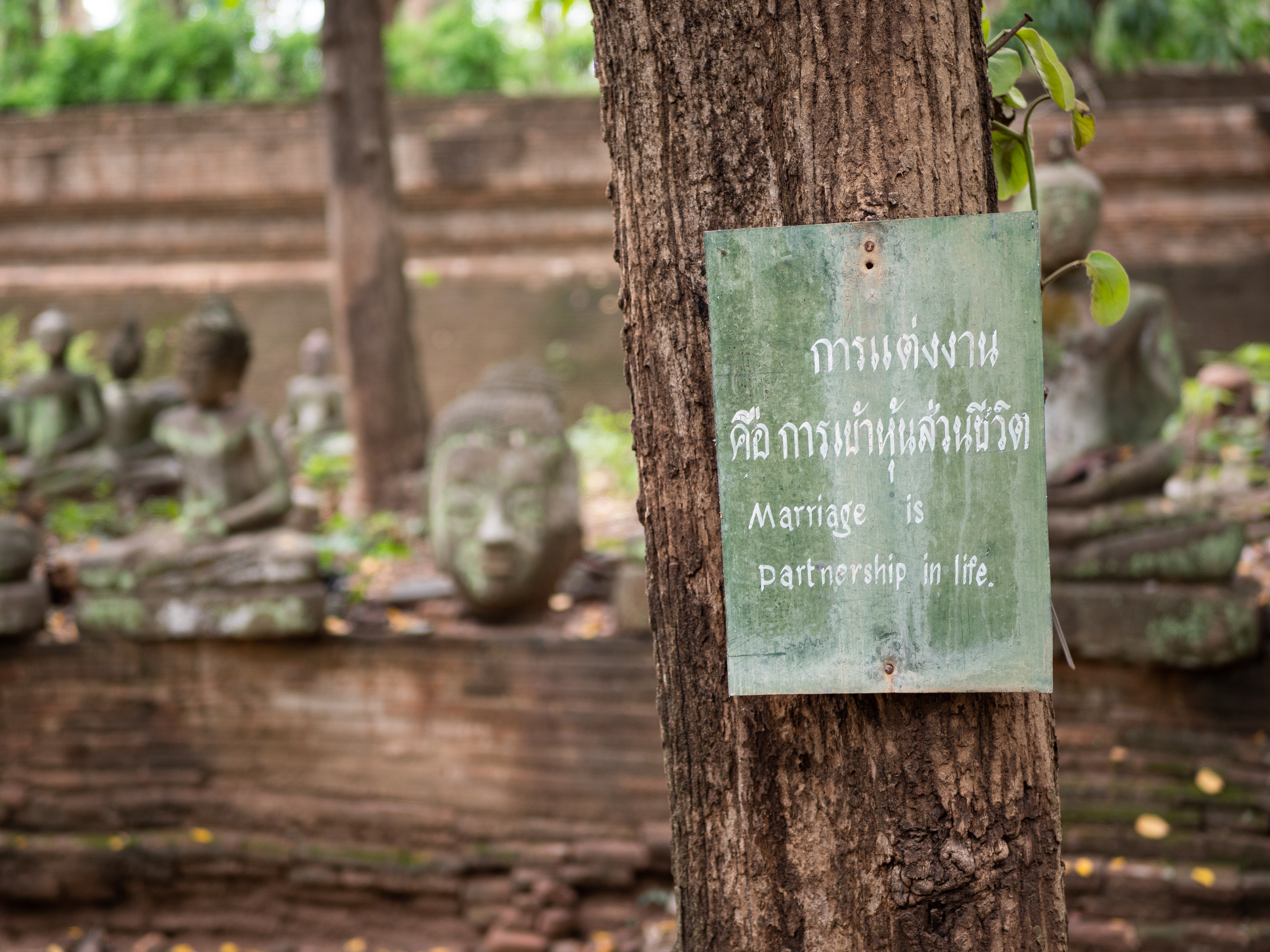
A "talking" sign at Wat Umong

The entire Wat Umong complex consists of 37.5 rai (15 acres) of wooded grounds. You can feed the fish, turtles, and ducks in a large pond. "Talking trees" have words of wisdom in Thai and English. The wat is famous for its ancient tunnels and large chedi. There are tunnels with Buddhist images below the chedi which can be easily explored. These tunnels were supposedly built by the King and painted with bush scenes so they could keep a famous but mentally deranged monk within the grounds of the monastery as he had a habit of just wandering off into the bush for days on end. Signs (proverbs) written in English and Thai hang from the trees on footpaths leading to the small lake where fish, pigeons, and turtles can be fed.

Other attractions include a Buddha field of broken sculpture, a fasting Bodhisattva, a Spiritual Theatre of paintings similar to those at Suan Mokkh, reproductions of ancient Buddhist sculpture of India, and a library-museum. This last building offers many books on Buddhism and other philosophies as well as a collection of historic objects and Buddhist art.

== Current status ==
Wat Umong is unique in that the resident monks live in a very natural setting, and occasionally feed the deer that live in the area. It also is possible to practice meditation at Wat Umong and to learn from the monks.
