= Pakkhagaṇanā =

A lunar calendar used by the Dhammayuttika order

Pakkhagaṇanā board at Wat Rachathiwat, Bangkok

Pakkhagaṇanā (Thai: ปักขคณนา) is a lunar calendar devised by Mongkut, king of Siam during his monkhood. It is currently employed by Buddhist monks from the Dhammayuttika Nikaya. The calendar consists of a collection of pakkhas (i.e. fortnights), short (14 days) or long (15 days). Odd pakshas represent the waxing moon, while even pakshas are for the waning moon. The calculation process is straightforward but contains many steps. The 14th or 15th day of each pakkha denotes either new moon or full moon. On the eighth day and the end (i.e. 14th or 15th day) of each pakkha, monks will assemble within the ordination hall to chant, meditate and review their conduct (i.e. uposatha).

The Greater order, to which most monks belong, uses another simplified calendar, the Thai lunar calendar. This simplified calendar is similar to the Hindu calendar but all months are numbered. Odd months have 29 days, the waning pakkha has 14 days. Even months have 30 days, the waning pakkha has 15 days. The waxing pakkha always has 15 days. If the Loy Krathong day is too early (i.e. falling in October), an intercalary eight month is added (i.e. the eight month is repeated). Sometimes the Thai lunar calendar is adjusted to synchronise with the pakkhagaṇanā by adding the 30th day to the seventh month. The Pakkhagaṇanā allows any pakkha, waxing or waning, to have 14 or 15 days rather than setting the rule.

== Etymology ==
The term pakkhagaṇanā is a combination of pakkha and gaṇanā. The first component, pakkha, refers to either side of the body, a wing of half a month (i.e. fortnight). The second part, gaṇanā, means counting or calculating. As a result, the word pakkhagaṇanā means the calculation or computation of fortnight. In other words, the pakkhagaṇanā calendar aims to count the day and group them in pakkhas, which are then collected over a long period of time. At the eight day and the end of the pakkha, monks from the Dhammayuttika order will assemble to chant and recite the pāṭimokkhas, rules that buddhist monks must comply with.

In accordance with the greater division of the Vinaya Pitaka, when Gautama Buddha returned to Rajgir after a break, there are some monks collecting alms. The townsfolks asked the monks "what is the lunar day of today?" The monks could not answer the question and said "we do not know the answer to your question". The townsfolks frowned and became unsastisfied by the monks' response. The monks reported to Buddha, who promptly replied "you should all learn how to count the lunar fortnight (pakkhagaṇanā)". After that, the calendar has been developing to suit the need of buddhist monks as well as civil needs.

== Organization ==
Pakkhagaṇanā is a repeating calendar organized like an army. Each day is represented like a soldier, each of them represents each phase of the moon. A single period, or the corps, is referred to as the aṭṭhara-saka (Thai: อัฏฐารสก), which lasts 289577 days. Each aṭṭhara-saka is further divided into 17 maha-sambayuhas(Thai: มหาสัมพยุหะ, i.e. greater division) and 1 chula-sambayuha (Thai: จุลสัมพยุหะ, i.e. lesser division). A maha-sambayuha contains 16168 days, which can be represented by 10 chula-bayuhas (Thai: จุลพยุหะ, i.e. lesser regiment), each of which has 1447 days, and 1 maha-bayuha (Thai: มหาพยุหะ, i.e. greater regiment) containing 1698 days. A chula-sambayuha, on the other hand, has one less chula-bayuha. In each maha-bayuha, there are 6 maha-samuhas (Thai: มหาสมุหะ, i.e. greater battalion), each of which represents 251 days, and 1 chula-samuha (Thai: จุลสมุหะ, i.e. lesser battalion) which lasts 192 days. A maha-samuha contains 3 chula-vaggas (Thai: จุลวรรค, i.e. lesser company), each of which contains 59 days, and 1 maha-vagga (Thai: มหาวรรค, i.e. greater company) which has 74 days. A chula-samuha is similar to a maha-samuha but has one less chula-vagga. A maha-vagga has 74 days, divided into 4 maha-pakkhas (Thai: มหาปักข์, i.e. greater platoon) and 1 chula-pakkha (Thai: จุลปักข์, i.e. lesser platoon). A chula-vagga is similar to a maha-vagga but has one less maha-pakkha. A maha-pakkha is a pakkha having 15 days, while a chula-pakkhahas 14 days. The greater the day of pakkha, the nearer to the full or new moon.

Mongkut stated in the book Explanation about adika-masa, adika-vara and pakkhaganana about how to organize the calendar. The explanation, as translated, can be expressed as: (Note: The original statement was "จะว่าด้วยกาลนับปักข์ตามมัชฌิมะคติให้ปริสัช ที่ไม่รู้ภาษามคธได้เข้าใจ ก็คำที่เรียกว่าปักข์นั้น คือแปลว่าปีกแห่งเดือน คือนับแต่พระจันทร์เพ็ญจนดับ ดับจนเพ็ญเรียกว่าปักข์หนึ่ง ๆ ก็ในปักข์หนึ่งนั้นบางทีมีวัน ๑๔ ๑๕ ก็ในปักข์ ๑๕ นั้น เรียกว่า ปักข์ถ้วน ในปักข์ ๑๔ นั้น เรียกว่า ปักข์ขาด ก็ปักข์ถ้วนสาม ปักข์ขาดหนึ่งเรียกว่า จุละวัคค์ ปักข์ถ้วนสี่ ปักข์ขาดหนึ่ง เรียกว่า มหาวัคค์ จุละวัคค์สองที มหาวัคค์ทีหนึ่ง เรียกว่า จุลละสะมุหะ จุละวัคค์สามที มหาวัคค์ทีหนึ่ง เรียกว่ามหาสะมุหะ ในชั้นนี้ใช้มหาสะมุหะเป็นพื้น มหาสมุหะหกครั้ง จุลสะมุหะทีหนึ่ง เรียกมหาพยุหะ มหาสะมุหะห้าครั้ง จุละสะมุหะทีหนึ่ง เรียกว่า จุละพยุหะ ในชั้นนี้ใช้จุละพยุหะเป็นพื้น ฯ จุละพยุหะเก้าที มหาพยุหะทีหนึ่ง เรียก จุลสัมพยุหะ จุลพยุหะสิบที มหาพยุหะทีหนึ่ง เรียกว่า มหาสัมพยุหะ ในชั้นนี้ใช้มหาสัมพยุหะเป็นพื้น มหาสัมพยุหะมาได้สิบเจ็ดที จุละสัมพยุหะมาทีหนึ่ง เมื่อเป็นไปได้เท่านี้ คะติพระ ๑, ๒ ว่าจะได้เป็นเหมือน โดยมัชฌิมะคะติครั้งหนึ่ง ฯ")

I would like to explain how to count pakkhas for the benefit of Buddhists who do not understand Pali. The term pakkha refers to either of the wings of the month or half a month. From the full moon until the new moon; this is a pakkha. From the new moon until the other full moon; this is also a pakkha. Each pakkha can have either 14 or 15 days. The pakkha with 15 days is referred to as a greater pakkha or maha-pakkha. The pakkha with 14 days is termed as a lesser pakkha. If we accumulate 3 greater pakkhas and 1 lesser pakkha, we have a minor vagga. If we have 4 greater pakkhas and 1 lesser pakkha, we have a greater vagga. 2 minor vaggas and 1 greater vagga form a minor samuha. 3 minor vaggas and 1 greater vagga form a greater samuha. Now let us consider the greater samuha. Six greater samuhas and one minor samuha are called a greater bayuha. Five greater samuhas and one minor samuha are called a minor bayuha. Let us now consider a minor bayuha. Nine minor bayuhas and one greater bayuha form a minor sambayuha. Ten minor bayuhas and one more greater bayuha are combined as a greater sambayuha. Let us think about the greater sambayuha. If there are 17 greater sambayuhas and 1 more minor sambayuha, the positions of the Sun and the Moon become synchronized again.

Annually, Mahamakut Buddhist University publishes the calendar based on the pakkhagaṇanā to be used exclusively by the Dhammayuttika order. There have been many attempts to improve the accuracy of the Thai lunar calendar by taking the astronomical data into account. However, those attempts remain unapplied.

The modified pakkhagaṇanā chart looks like the following table:

No	0	1	2	3	4	5	6	7	8	9	10	11	12	13	14	15	16	17
Atthara-saka อฏฺฐารสก/อัฏฐารสก	M	M	M	M	M	M	M	M	M	M	M	M	M	M	M	M	M	C
Maha-sambayuha มหาสมฺพยุห/มหาสัมพยุหะ	C	C	C	C	C	C	C	C	C	C	M							
Chula-sambayuha จุลสมฺพยุห/จุลสัมพยุหะ	C	C	C	C	C	C	C	C	C	M								
Maha-bayuha มหาพยุห/มหาพยุหะ	M	M	M	M	M	M	C											
Chula-bayuha จุลพยุห/จุลพยุหะ	M	M	M	M	M	C												
Maha-samuha มหาสมุห/มหาสมุหะ	C	C	C	M														
Chula-samuha จุลสมุห/จุลสมุหะ	C	C	M															
Maha-vagga มหาวคฺค/มหาวรรค	M	M	M	M	C													
Chula-vagga จุลวคฺค/จุลวรรค	M	M	M	C														
Maha-pakkha มหาปกฺข/มหาปักข์	1	2	3	4	5	6	7	8	9	10	11	12	13	14	15			
Chula-pakkha จุลปกฺข/จุลปักข์	1	2	3	4	5	6	7	8	9	10	11	12	13	14				

== Computation ==
Pakkhagaṇanā Calendar
- Date (Gregorian calendar): 20 November 2026
- Maha-sambayuha: 6
- Chula-bayuha: 6
- Maha-samuha: 2
- Chula-vagga: 0
- Maha-pakkha: 1
- Moon phase: Waxing moon
- Lunar day within this pakkha: 11
- Illumination percentage: 74
- Note: The leftmost sambayuha, bayuha, samuha, vagga and pakkha are labelled 0 for the ease of computation.

The original explanation, as outlined above, is rather verbose and ancient. However, after careful inspection and interpretation, the following algorithm can be achieved.

The current calendar period started at the full moon of 28 January 1736 (JD = 2355148). It will end on 27 November 2528 before starting over again the next day. In order to calculate the moon phase using the pakkhagaṇanā, following procedures are followed.

1. Let $S, B, M, V, P$ be the number of sambayuha, bayuha, samuha, vagga and pakkha respectively. Let $L_S,L_B,L_M,L_V,L_P$ be the label of sambayuha, bayuha, samuha, vagga and pakkha respectively.
2. Let $PD = \mod \left[\left(JD - 2355147\right),289577\right]$, where $JD$ represents the Julian day of that day. If $PD = 0$, then let $PD = 289577$.
3. $S = \lfloor\frac{PD}{16168}\rfloor$
4. If $S<17$, then $L_S = M$, otherwise $L_S = C$.
5. $R = PD - \left(S \times 16168 \right)$.
6. $B = \lfloor\frac{R}{1447}\rfloor$.
7. If $L_S = M$, then and $B = 11$, then set $B = 10$. If $L_S = C$ and $B = 10$, then set $B = 9$. This step is to prevent overrunning the rightmost block of the table.
8. If $L_S = M$ and $B<10$, then $L_B = C$. On the other hand, if $L_S = C$ and $B<9$, then $L_B = C$. Otherwise, let $L_B = M$.
9. $R = R - \left(B \times 1447 \right)$
10. $M = \lfloor\frac{R}{251}\rfloor$
11. If $L_B = M$ and $M<6$, then $L_M = M$. On the other hand, if $L_B = C$ and $M<5$, then $L_M = M$. Otherwise, let $L_M = C$.
12. $R = R - \left(M \times 251 \right)$
13. $V = \lfloor\frac{R}{59}\rfloor$
14. If $L_M = M$ and $V = 4$, then set $V = 3$. If $L_M = C$ and $V = 3$, then set $V = 2$. Again, this step is to prevent overrunning the rightmost block of the table.
15. If $L_M = M$ and $V<3$, then $L_V = C$. On the other hand, if $L_M = C$ and $V<2$, then $L_V = M$. Otherwise, let $L_V = C$.
16. $R = R - \left(V \times 59\right)$
17. $P = \lfloor\frac{R-1}{15}\rfloor$
18. If $L_V = M$ and $P<4$, then $L_P = M$. On the other hand, if $L_V = C$ and $P<3$, then $L_P = M$. Otherwise, let $L_P = C$.
19. $d = R - \left(P \times 15\right)$

Note that the following equation must be satisfied: $PD = 16168 \times S + 1447 \times B + 251 \times M + 59 \times V + 15 \times P + d$.

The pakkha-kendra, or the number of pakkhas since the start of the period can be found using $N_{pk} = 1095 \times S + 98 \times B + 17\times M + 4 \times V + 15 \times N_P$.

If $\mod \left(N_{pk},2\right) = 1$, that pakkha represents the waxing moon, otherwise that pakkha represents the waning moon.

Once the computation has completed, all labels and values can be represented on a chart,

=== Example ===
Pakkhagaṇanā Calendar
- Date (Gregorian calendar): 1 January 2027
- Maha-sambayuha: 6
- Chula-bayuha: 6
- Maha-samuha: 2
- Chula-vagga: 1
- Maha-pakkha: 0
- Moon phase: Waning moon
- Lunar day within this pakkha: 9
- Illumination percentage: 40
- Note: The leftmost sambayuha, bayuha, samuha, vagga and pakkha are labelled 0 for the ease of computation.

1 January 2027 can be represented as a Julian date of 2461407. Therefore, $PD=\left(2461407 - 2355147\right)=106260$. There is no need to evaluate the modulo of the result with 289577.

==== Sambayuha ====
Step 3-5 can be applied as follows:

- $S = \lfloor \frac{106260}{16168} \rfloor = 6$;
- Since $S<17$, then $L_S = M$; and
- $R = 106260 - \left(6 \times 16168 \right) = 9252$.

==== Bayuha ====
Step 6-9 can be applied as follows:

- $B = \lfloor\frac{9252}{1447}\rfloor = 6$;
- Since $L_S = M$ and $B=6<10$, then $L_B = C$;
- $R = 9252 - \left(6 \times 1447 \right) = 570$.

==== Samuha ====
Step 10-12 are then applied:

- $M = \lfloor\frac{570}{251}\rfloor = 2$;
- Since $L_B = C$ and $M=2<5$, then $L_M = M$;
- $R = 570 - \left(2 \times 251 \right) = 68$.

==== Vagga ====
Step 13-16 are then executed:

- $V = \lfloor\frac{68}{59}\rfloor=1$
- Since $L_M = M$ and $V=1<3$, then $L_V = C$;
- $R = 68 - \left(1 \times 59\right) = 9$.

==== Pakkha ====
Step 17-19 are further applied:

- $P = \lfloor\frac{9-1}{15}\rfloor = 0$
- Since $L_V = C$ and $P=0<3$, then $L_P = M$.
- $d = 9 - \left(0 \times 15\right) = 9$

Pakkha-kendra: $N_{pk} = 1095 \times 6 + 98 \times 6 + 17\times 2 + 4 \times 1 + 15 \times 0 = 7196$. Since 7196 is an even number, this fortnight has the waning moon.

This means the 1 January 2027 can be represented by 6th maha-sambayuha, 6th chula-bayuha, 2nd maha-samuha, 1st chula-vagga, 0th maha-pakkha. The remainder of 9 represents the 9th day of the fortnight with the waning moon. These are traditionally represented by a board having the following markers. Note that the letter "M" or "C" from the upper category must correspond to the lower category. For instance, if the 6th column of maha-sambayuha is chosen, the letter "C" indicates that the chula-bayuha must be selected.

No	0	1	2	3	4	5	6	7	8	9	10	11	12	13	14	15	16	17
Atthara-saka	M	M	M	M	M	M	M	M	M	M	M	M	M	M	M	M	M	C
Maha-sambayuha	C	C	C	C	C	C	C	C	C	C	M							
Chula-sambayuha	C	C	C	C	C	C	C	C	C	M								
Maha-bayuha	M	M	M	M	M	M	C											
Chula-bayuha	M	M	M	M	M	C												
Maha-samuha	C	C	C	M														
Chula-samuha	C	C	M															
Maha-vagga	M	M	M	M	C													
Chula-vagga	M	M	M	C														
Maha-pakkha	1	2	3	4	5	6	7	8	9	10	11	12	13	14	15			
Chula-pakkha	1	2	3	4	5	6	7	8	9	10	11	12	13	14				

== See also ==
- Dhammayutika Nikaya
- Lunar phase
- Thai lunar calendar
- Julian day

== Bibliography ==
- ลอย ชุนพงษ์ทอง (Loy Chunpongtong) (2018). The Thai Calendar based on Astronomy and Mathematics. Chiang Mai: The National Astronomical Research Institute of Thailand. ISBN 978-9747444-24-7.
- ลอย ชุนพงษ์ทอง (Loy Chunpongtong) (2016). "Computation of Adhika-masa under the Dynamical System". วารสารราชบัณฑิตยสถาน (The Journal of The Royal Society of Thailand).
- ความรู้เรื่อง ปักขคณนา ตำราการคำนวณปฏิทินทางจันทรคติ (General Knowledge on the Pakkhagaṇanā and How to Compute the Lunar Calendar). มหาวิทยาลัยมหามกูฎราชวิทยาลัย. 1999.
- พระยาบริรักษ์เวชชการ (บริรักษ์ ติตติรานนท์) (1956). หลักการวางอธิกมาสและอธิกวาร (PDF). มหาวิทยาลัยมหามกูฎราชวิทยาลัย. (How to Intercalate the Thai Lunisolar Calendar, Borirak Titiranon).
- พิภพ ตังคณะสิงห์ (n.d.). คำอธิบายอธิกมาศและอธิกวาร. ฺเกษมบรรณกิจ. (On the Intercalary Month and Day in the Thai Lunar Calendar, Phiphob Tangkhanasing).
- Mongkut, Bhanurangsi Savangwongse (1924). On the Intercalated Month and Day and Fortnight Computation (ตำราอธิกมาศ อธิกวาร และปักขณะนาพระบรมราชาธิบายในพระบาทสมเด็จ ฯ พระจอมเกล้าเจ้าอยู่หัว). Sobhon Bibatthanakorn Publishing House (โรงพิมพ์โสภณพิพรรธนากร).
