= Māgha Pūjā =

Buddhist festival and day of observance in Southeast and South Asia

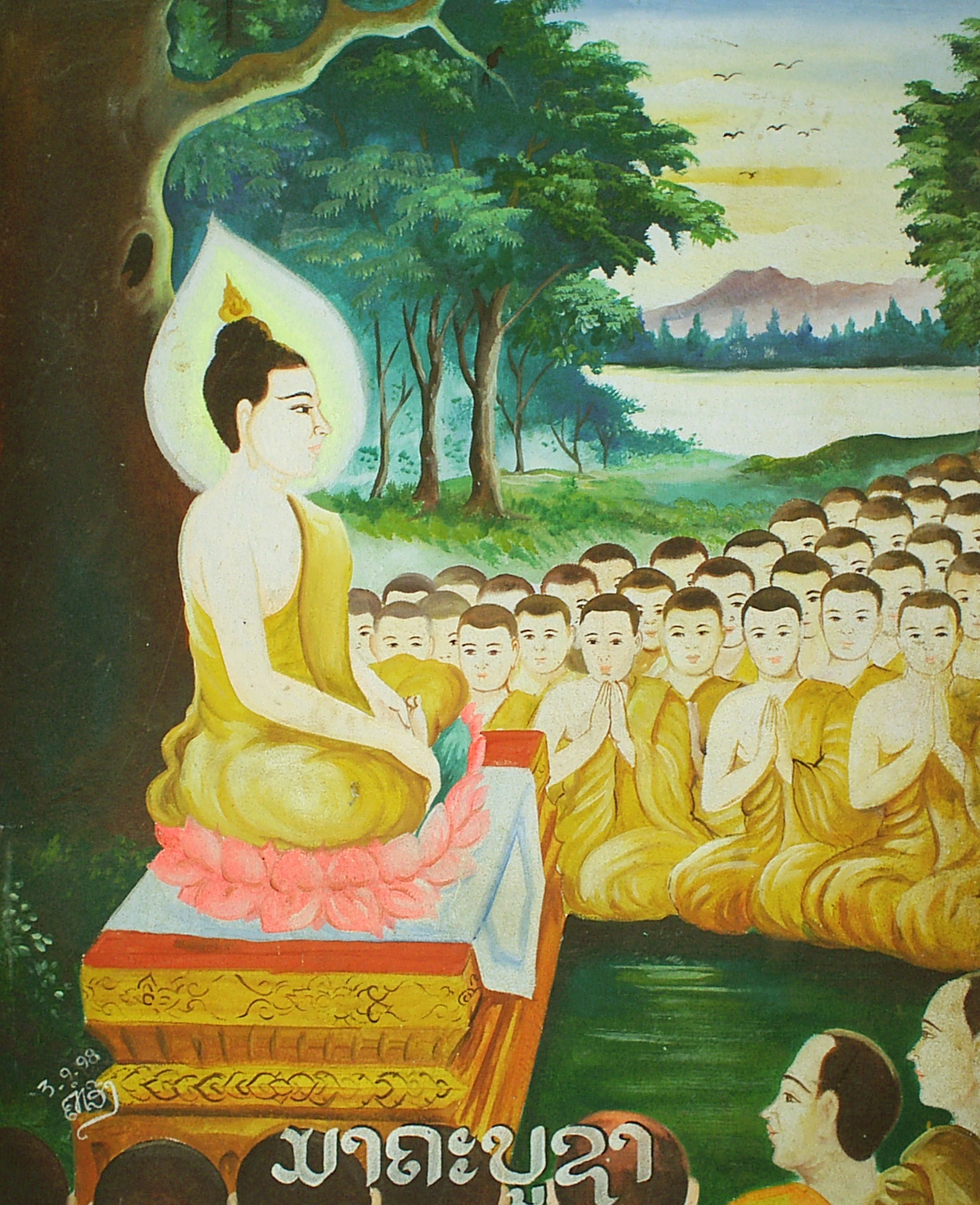
- The Buddha giving a discourse on Māgha Pūjā
- Also called: Saṅgha Day; Fourfold Assembly Day
- Observed by: Cambodian, Lao, Burmese, Sri Lankan, Thai, and Indonesian Theravāda Buddhists
- Type: Buddhism
- Significance: Commemoration of the meeting between the Buddha and his first 1,250 disciples
- Celebrations: Shwedagon Pagoda Festival
- Observances: Procession with light, general merit-making activities
- Date: Full moon day of the 3rd lunar month (Gregorian order) or equivalently the 9th lunar month in the Buddhist calendar.
- Duration: varies
- Related to: Chotrul Duchen (in Tibet); Daeboreum (in Korea); Koshōgatsu (in Japan); Lantern Festival (in China); Tết Nguyên Tiêu (in Vietnam) មាឃបូជា-Meak Bochea (in Cambodia)

Māgha Pūjā (also written as Makha Bucha Day, Meak Bochea) is a Buddhist festival celebrated on the full moon day of the third lunar month in Cambodia, Laos, Thailand, Sri Lanka and on the full moon day of Tabaung in Myanmar. It is the second most important Buddhist festival after Vesak; it celebrates a gathering that was held between the Buddha and 1,250 of his first disciples, which, according to tradition, preceded the custom of periodic recitation of discipline by monks. On the day, Buddhists celebrate the creation of an ideal and exemplary community, which is why it is sometimes called Saṅgha Day, the Saṅgha referring to the Buddhist community, and for some Buddhist schools this is specifically the monastic community. In Thailand, the Pāli term Māgha-pūraṇamī is also used for the celebration, meaning 'to honor on the full moon of the third lunar month'. Finally, some authors referred to the day as the Buddhist All Saints Day.

In pre-modern times, Māgha Pūjā has been celebrated by some Southeast Asian communities. But it became widely popular in the modern period, when it was instituted in Thailand by King Rama IV in the mid-19th century. From Thailand, it spread to other South and Southeast Asian countries. Presently, it is a public holiday in some of these countries. It is an occasion when Buddhists go to the temple to perform merit-making activities, such as alms giving, meditation and listening to teachings. It has been proposed in Thailand as a more spiritual alternative to the celebration of Valentine's Day.

== Etymology and date ==
Māgha is derived from the name of the third month in the traditional Indian lunar calendar, on which the celebration is held. It is also the name of a star, which during this period is close to the full moon. Māgha Pūjā is held on the full moon day. In a leap year, the celebration will be postponed to the full moon day of the fourth lunar month.

== Themes ==
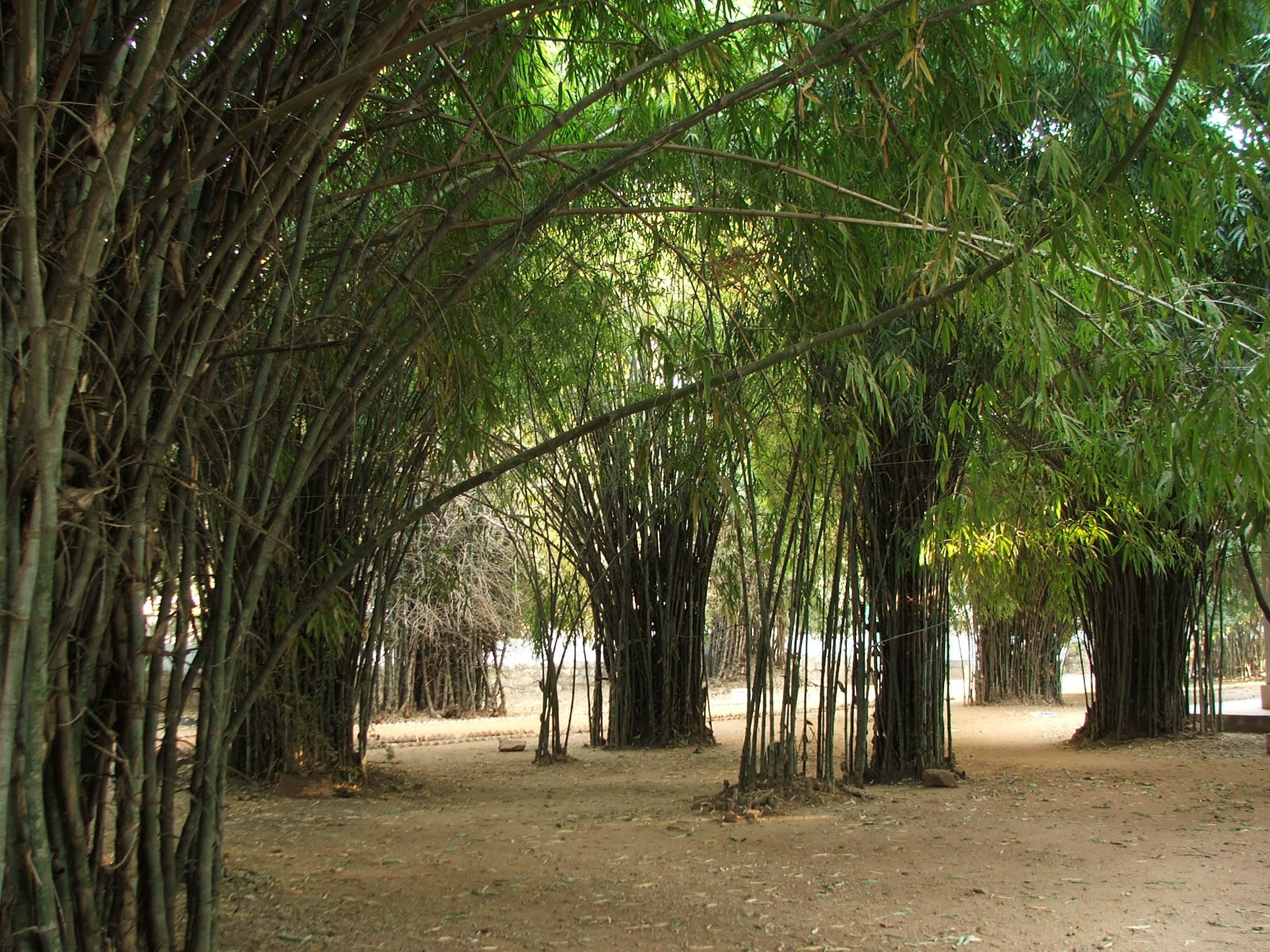
The meeting that is celebrated on Māgha Pūjā was held in Veḷuvana grove, near Rājagaha (present Rajgir) in northern India

Māgha Pūjā day marks an event occurring at the Veḷuvana grove, near Rājagaha (present Rajgir) in northern India, ten months after the enlightenment of the Buddha. The traditional story goes that a meeting was held in the afternoon, that had four characteristics, known as the cāturaṅgasannipāta:

1. 1,250 disciples came to see the Buddha that evening without being summoned; These were mostly pupils from the Buddha's recently converted disciples, such as the three Kassapa brothers, and the monks Sāriputta and Mogallāna.
2. All of them were Arahants, enlightened disciples;
3. All had been ordained by the Buddha himself, and therefore were his direct spiritual descendants;
4. It was the full-moon day of the third lunar month.

Because of these four factors, Māgha Pūjā is also known as the Fourfold Assembly Day. On this occasion, the Buddha taught those arahants a summary of Buddhism, called the Ovādapātimokkha. In these, three principles were given:

"The non-doing of evil / the full performance of what is wholesome / the total purification of the mind."

This is followed by a formulation of Buddhist ideals:

"Patience (and) forbearance are the highest austerity. The awakened ones say nibbāna is the highest. One is certainly not a wanderer if one injures others; one is not an ascetic if one harms another."

Finally, the last stanza is about the path of religious practice:

"Not abusing, not injuring, and restraint under the rules of discipline, and knowing moderation in eating, and secluded lodgings, and exertion in respect of higher thought, this is the teaching of the awakened ones."

According to the traditional Pāli commentaries, the Buddha continued to teach this summary for a period of twenty years, after which the custom was replaced by the recitation of the monastic code of discipline by the Saṅgha themselves. On Māgha Pūjā today, Buddhists celebrate the creation of an ideal and exemplary community.

Māgha Pūjā is also the day that the Buddha is believed to have announced in Vesālī that he would die (parinibbāna) in three months, and after the announcement a supernatural earthquake followed. (Note: See Bhaskar (2009, pp. 259–60), Ling & Axelrod (1979, p. 70) and Polsompop, Thawee (11 March 2018). มาฆบูชา [Māgha Pūjā]. Matichon (in Thai). Only the last source mentions Vesālī and the earthquake.) Moreover, In Sri Lanka, it is considered the day that the Buddha appointed his two main disciples, the monks Sāriputta and Moggallāna. Apart from the religious meaning, Māgha Pūjā also reflects the Southeast Asian agricultural year, as it is celebrated after the harvest.

== History ==
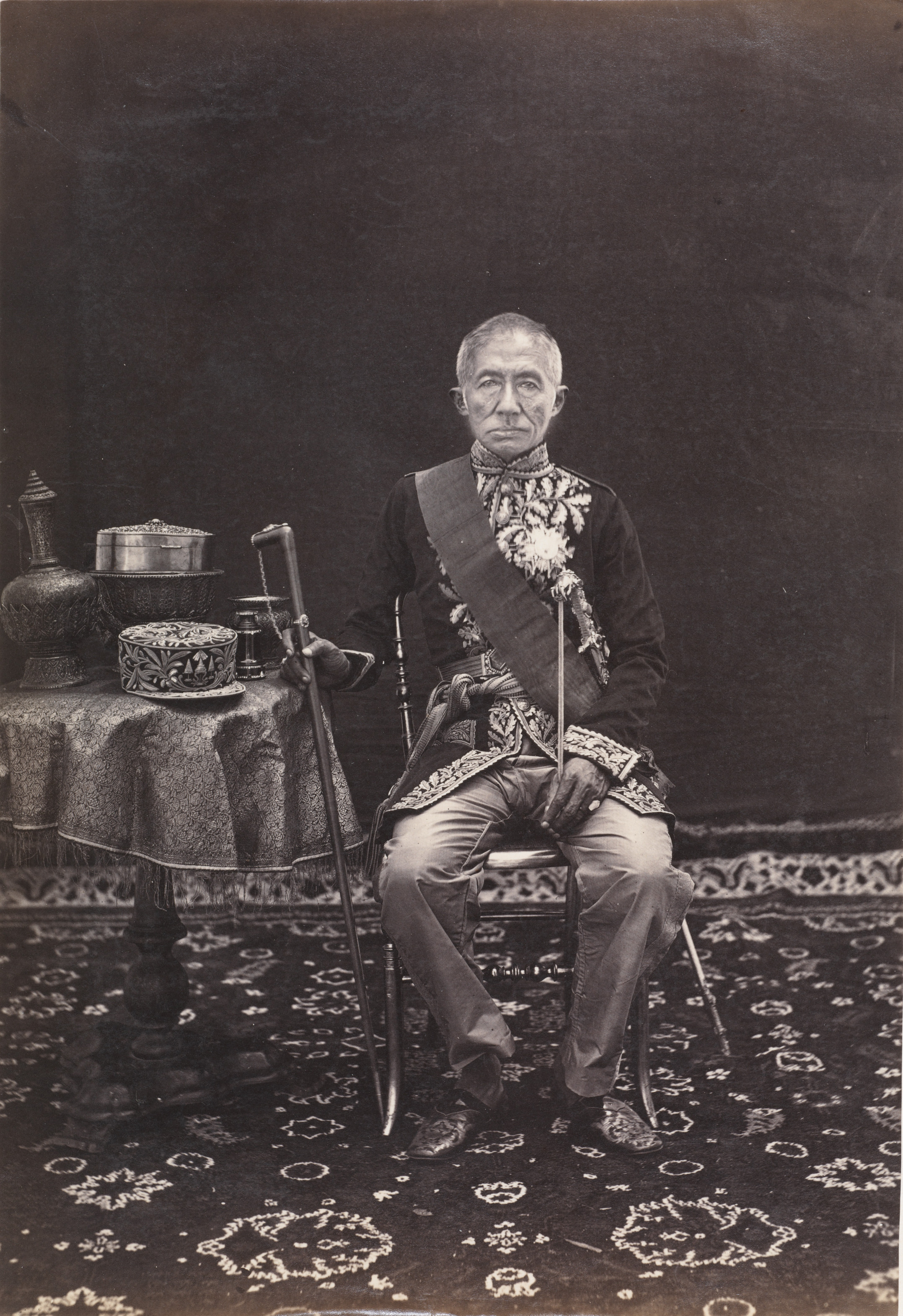
King Rama IV

Little is known on how traditional Buddhist societies celebrated this event in pre-modern times, but Māgha Pūjā was recognized and celebrated in Lan Na, Lan Xang and Northeastern Thailand. Practices of worship probably varied a lot. The first known instance in modern times was during the reign of the Thai king Rama IV (1804–68) who instituted it as a ceremony in 1851. (Note: See Melton (2011, pp. 538, 699, Māgha Pūjā Day, Ploughing Day) and 7 เรื่องน่ารู้ วันมาฆบูชา 2561 [7 interesting facts about this year's Māgha Pūjā]. Thai Rath (in Thai). 1 March 2017. Archived from the original on 1 March 2018. For the year, see Daniels, Gulevich & Thompson (2009, p. 535). For the claim about the first celebration, see Prawat Kanprakop Phiti Makha Bucha ประวัติการประกอบพิธีมาฆบูชา [History of holding the Māgha Pūjā celebration]. Office for the Development of National Identity. 1981. Archived from the original on 2 May 2017.) He reasoned that the Māgha Pūjā "... was an important gathering, a miracle in Buddhism. Wise and knowledgeable people have therefore used this opportunity to honour the Buddha and the 1,250 arahants, which is a foundation of faith and a sense of urgency". He first held it in Temple of the Emerald Buddha, in the palace only. In the evening, 31 monks from the temples Wat Bowonniwet Vihara and Wat Ratchapradit would recite the Ovādapātimokkha, lit lanterns around the ubosot (ordination hall), and give a sermon about the same Ovādapātimokkha in the Pāli and Thai languages. The King or his representative would join the yearly ceremony. (Note: Pengvipas (2013, p. 49), "Kanphraratchakuson Makha Bucha Chaturongkhasannibat" การพระราชกุศลมาฆบูชาจาตุรงคสันนิบาต [Charity performed by the King during Māgha Pūjā, the Fourfold Assembly Day] (PDF). Royal Thai Government Gazette (in Thai). 32 (27): 2920. 27 February 1915. Archived from the original (PDF) on November 7, 2011 and "Prawat Kanprakop Phiti Makha Bucha" ประวัติการประกอบพิธีมาฆบูชา [History of holding the Māgha Pūjā celebration]. Office for the Development of National Identity. 1999. Archived from the original on 2 May 2017. For the representative, see the Gazette and the ODNI. Pengvipas has 31 monks, the ODNI has 30, whereas the Gazette mentions 30 monks and a leading monk.) A recitation text used for this occasion is attributed to Rama IV. As part of an enduring effort to centralize and regularize Thai Buddhism, Rama IV's successor Rama V (1853–1910) expanded the practice and organized it as a national celebration in the Temple of the Emerald Buddha. (Note: For the celebration in the Temple of the Emerald Buddha, see Melton (2011, pp. 538, 699, Māgha Pūjā Day, Ploughing Day). For the centralization, see Swearer (2001, p. 202).) In 1913, he officially established it as a public holiday, as he started to organize the ceremonies in other places than the palace. By 1937, the ceremony was widely held and observed in Thailand, but by 1957, it had fallen out of usage. Supreme Patriarch-to-be Plod Kittisobhano helped to revive it. (Note: For 1937, see Wells (1939, p. 79, n.1). For 1957, see Premchit & Dore (1992, pp. 128–129).) From Thailand, the practice spread to neighboring countries which have a majority of Theravāda Buddhists. (Note: For the history. see Melton (2011, pp. 538, 699, Māgha Pūjā Day, Ploughing Day). For the Theravāda countries, see Ruiz-Canela, Gaspar (23 February 2016). "Los budistas celebran el "Magha Puja" en el Sudeste Asiático" [In Southeast Asia, Buddhists celebrate Māgha Pūjā]. Efe (in Spanish). Archived from the original on 3 March 2016.)

== Celebrations and observances ==
Māgha Pūjā is a day that laypeople make merit. (Note: In Buddhism, merit is a "beneficial and protective force which extends over a long period of time"—and is the effect of good deeds (Pali: kamma, Sanskrit: karma) done through physical action, words, or thought. Internally, merit makes the mind happy and virtuous. Externally, present good circumstances, such as a long life, health and wealth, as well as the character and abilities someone is born with, arise from merits done in the past and vice versa, with demerits.) This is usually done with a motivation to improve oneself in the cycle of existence. Monastics and lay devotees will hold processions, light candles, attending preaching and making offerings of food, as well as meditating and Buddhist chants. Also, devotees will sometimes release animals from captivity. (Note: See Bhaskar (2009, pp. 259–60). For the food, meditation, chants and animals, see Daniels, Gulevich & Thompson (2009, p. 535).) Moreover, devotees uphold and reflect on the five Buddhist moral precepts on this day, which includes avoiding intoxicants. Māgha Pūjā is celebrated most extensively in Thailand, but it is a national holiday in most Southeast Asian countries, such as Laos and Myanmar.

=== Thailand ===
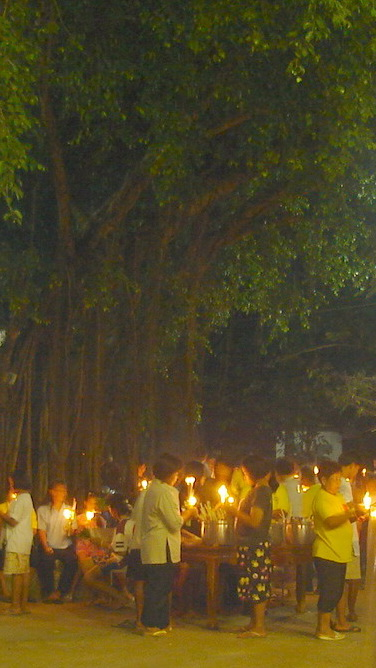
Māgha Pūjā Day in Wat Khung Taphao, the Uttaradit Province, Thailand.

In Thailand, Māgha Pūjā is designated as a national holiday, on which sale of alcohol has been strictly prohibited since 2015. On the evening of Māgha Pūjā, urban temples in Thailand hold a candlelight procession and circumambulation around the main ubosot called a wian thian (wian meaning to circle around; thian meaning candle). (Note: See Ling & Axelrod (1979, p. 70), 7 เรื่องน่ารู้ วันมาฆบูชา 2561 [7 interesting facts about this year's Māgha Pūjā]. Thai Rath (in Thai). 1 March 2017. Archived from the original on 1 March 2018 and Daniels, Gulevich & Thompson (2009, p. 535). For the differences between urban and rural temples, see Premchit & Dore (1992, p. 129).) Furthermore, people will make merit by going to temples and by joining in with activities. Other popular ways to spend one's time in the week of Māgha Pūjā, as found in a 2019 poll by the Suan Dusit University among 5,335 respondents of different ages:

| Way to spend time | Percent (self-reported) |
|---|---|
| To give alms to monks | 56% |
| To make merit | 55% |
| To abstain from entertainment, nightlife or gambling | 48% |
| To persuade friends and family to visit the temple together | 45% |
| To join the candle procession at the temple | 44% |
| To listen to Buddhist sermons | 35% |
| To give food to monks at the temple | 28% |
| To uphold the five or eight precepts | 26% |
| To meditate | 26% |
| To recite Buddhist chants | 21% |

At times, special events are also held, such as a recital of the entire Buddhist scriptures and ceremonies for avowing oneself as a Buddhist lay person. The Dhammakaya Temple is particularly known for its visually grand celebration.

In Northern Thailand, Māgha Pūjā was only introduced in the 1960s, by a monk called Paññananda Bhikkhu. It is generally given less attention than in Central Thailand, due to the influence of the Central Ecclesiastical Council being less in the North. The candle procession has only become associated with Māgha Pūjā in the 1990s. In Northern and Northeastern Thailand, Buddhist relics are usually worshiped during the Māgha period.

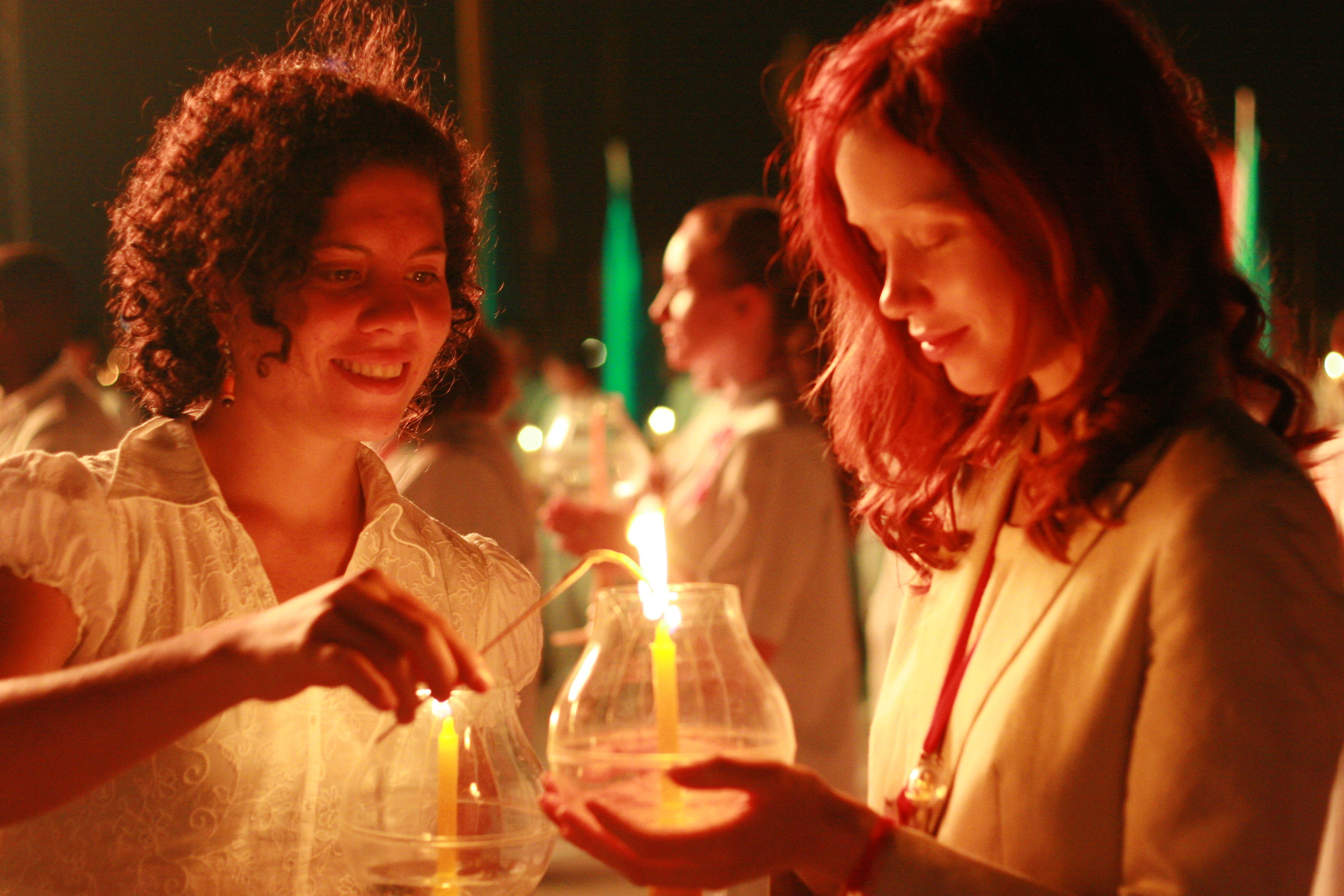
A youth program held in Thailand. The youth are joining in with a Māgha Pūjā celebration.

In 2003, a parliamentary question was raised by Premsak Phiayura, House of Representatives, requesting a Day of Gratitude, to express the importance of gratitude in Thai history and culture. Uraiwan Thianthong, the then minister of culture, felt this was unnecessary, since "there are quite a lot of occasions" in the Thai calendar to express gratitude. However, in 2006, the government of Thailand made an announcement that Māgha Pūjā should from then on be celebrated as a "national day of gratitude". This was intended as an alternative to Valentine's Day, in which Thai youth often aim to lose their virginity. Māgha Pūjā was therefore presented as a day of spiritual love and gratitude instead. To what extent Thai people are well informed about Māgha Pūjā is in dispute: in 2017, the National Institute of Development Administration (NIDA) held a poll among 1,250 subjects of diverse backgrounds and found that 58 percent of Thai did not know why Māgha Pūjā was important in Buddhism, and 75 percent did not know it had been branded as a day of gratitude. However, the Dusit poll showed that 75 percent of the respondents was able to tell that Māgha Pūjā was the day the Buddha taught the Ovādapātimokkha to his disciples, and 66 percent knew that it was the day that 1,250 of the Buddha's disciples came together spontaneously.

=== Cambodia ===
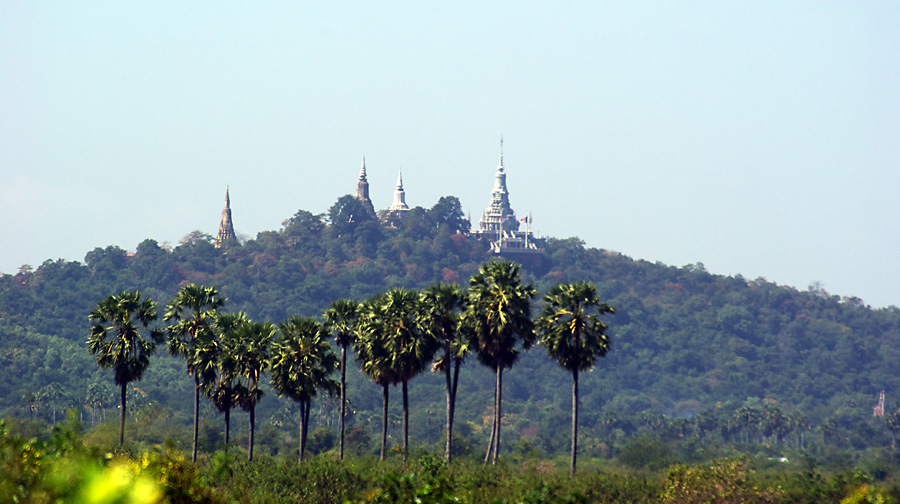
Alms offerings are held on Oudong Hill

In Cambodia, various celebrations are held during the Māgha Pūjā day. Ceremonies are held at Preah Reach Trop Mountain, for example, which are joined by 30,000 to 50,000 people, as of 2019; as well as alms offerings on Oudong Hill, which are joined yearly by thousands of people. On the day, devotees make merit, cook meals for elderly people or their parents, and clean up their houses. Since the late 2010s, the day has become more popular among youth, and more pagodas are organizing ceremonies. (Note: For Oudong Hill, see Sovuthy, Khy (19 February 2019). "Thousands mark Meak Bochea Day on Oudong hilltop". Khmer Times and Sovuthy, Khy (4 February 2015). "Thousands Flock to Oudong for Ancient Buddhist Ceremony". Cambodia Daily. Archived from the original on 16 October 2019. For the other statistics and information, see Dara, Voun (20 February 2019). "On Meak Bochea Day, PM hails impact of Buddhism". Phnom Penh Post. Asia News Network. Archived from the original on 22 February 2019 and Dara, Voun (19 February 2019). "Buddhists across Kingdom gear up for Meak Bochea day". Phnom Penh Post. Archived from the original on 15 October 2019.) In May 2019, the Cambodian Ministry of Information proposed a ban of advertising of alcohol on Māgha Pūjā and Vesak. Meanwhile, Prime Minister Hun Sen and the Ministry of Cults and Religion have promoted activities on the day, and education for youths about it. (Note: For the Prime Minister, see Dara, Voun (20 February 2019). "On Meak Bochea Day, PM hails impact of Buddhism". Phnom Penh Post. Asia News Network. Archived from the original on 22 February 2019. For the ministry, see Dara, Voun (19 February 2019). "Buddhists across Kingdom gear up for Meak Bochea day". Phnom Penh Post. Archived from the original on 15 October 2019.) However, in August 2019, local media reported the Cambodian government removed Māgha Pūjā from the list of national holidays to increase the country's competitiveness, because the number of holidays had become too high.

=== Myanmar (Burma) ===
In Myanmar, Māgha Pūjā (Burmese: တပေါင်းလပြည့်နေ့) is observed on the full moon day of Tabaung, the final month of the Burmese calendar. Furthermore, tradition has it that a king of Ukkalapa completed the building of the Shwedagon Pagoda and enshrined the hair of the Buddha in it on this day. Fifteen days before this full moon day, the Shwedagon Pagoda Festival is held, on which a ceremony is held for offerings to the 28 Buddhas (from Taṇhaṅkara to Gotama Buddha), followed by a 10-day continuous recital of Buddhist texts. Burmese devotees make merits and meditate during this period, and in Mandalay and the North, sand pagodas are made in honor of the Buddha. (Note: For the merits and meditation, see "Meritorious deeds performed at religious edifices throughout nation on Full Moon Day of Tabodwe". New Light of Myanmar. 19 Mar 2011. Archived from the original on November 13, 2011. For the sand pagodas, see Thiha, Nay (18 March 2019). "What to expect on Full Moon Day of Tabaung". Myanmore. Archived from the original on 21 March 2019.) Other pagoda festivals are held in this period, including the Shwe Settaw Pagoda Festival in the Magwe Region's Minbu Township and the Alaungdaw Kathapa Pagoda Festival, near the Alaungdaw Kathapa National Park in the Sagaing Region. The Botahtaung Pagoda and the Sule Pagoda are also much visited. Furthermore, the Kyaiktiyo Pagoda is very popular, and thousands of candles are lit around the boulder below the pagoda.

=== Sri Lanka ===
In Sri Lanka, Māgha Pūjā is called Navam Pohoya in the Sinhala language and is a national holiday during which many observe uposatha (Sinhala language: sil). Gangaramaya temple hosts a procession (Sinhala language: Navam perahera) with approximately 5,000 people and many elephants on this day. This perahera tradition started in Sri Lanka in the 1980s, and lasts for two days. Monks walk in the procession as well, chanting paritta texts. Dancers from multiple religious traditions perform during the walk.

=== Indonesia ===
In 2024, the Māgha Pūjā celebration in Indonesia was centered at the courtyard of Borobudur Temple, Magelang. Thousands of Buddhists solemnly participated in the entire series of events, including the pradaksina procession around the temple. The event, organized by the Ministry of Religious Affairs, also served as a form of support for the designation of Borobudur Temple as one of the centers for Buddhist puja for Indonesia and the world.

=== Other regions ===
Chinese communities celebrate a similar festival. In addition, Māgha Pūjā has become a popular event among Buddhist converts in the West, who consider it a day of exchanging gifts. (Note: "Sangha Day". BBC. 7 May 2004. Archived from the original on 18 December 2018 and Melton (2011, p. 539, Magha Puja Day). For the gifts, see Kalaitzidis, Anna. "Buddhism". Learning and Teaching at UNCW. University of New South Wales. Archived from the original on 8 April 2011.)

== See also ==
- Visakha Puja
- Asalha Puja
- Chotrul Duchen, a festival celebrated in Tibet as an Uposatha day and falls on around the same day as Māgha Pūjā
- First Full Moon Festival, a festival celebrated in China, Japan, Korea and Vietnam as an Uposatha day and to mark the end of the Lunar New Year, falling on or around the same day as Māgha Pūjā
  - Lantern Festival, in China and Taiwan
  - Daeboreum, in Korea
  - Koshōgatsu, in Japan
  - Tết Nguyên tiêu, in Vietnam
