= Wat Chonlaprathan Rangsarit =

Buddhist temple in Thailand

- วัดชลประทานรังสฤษดิ์
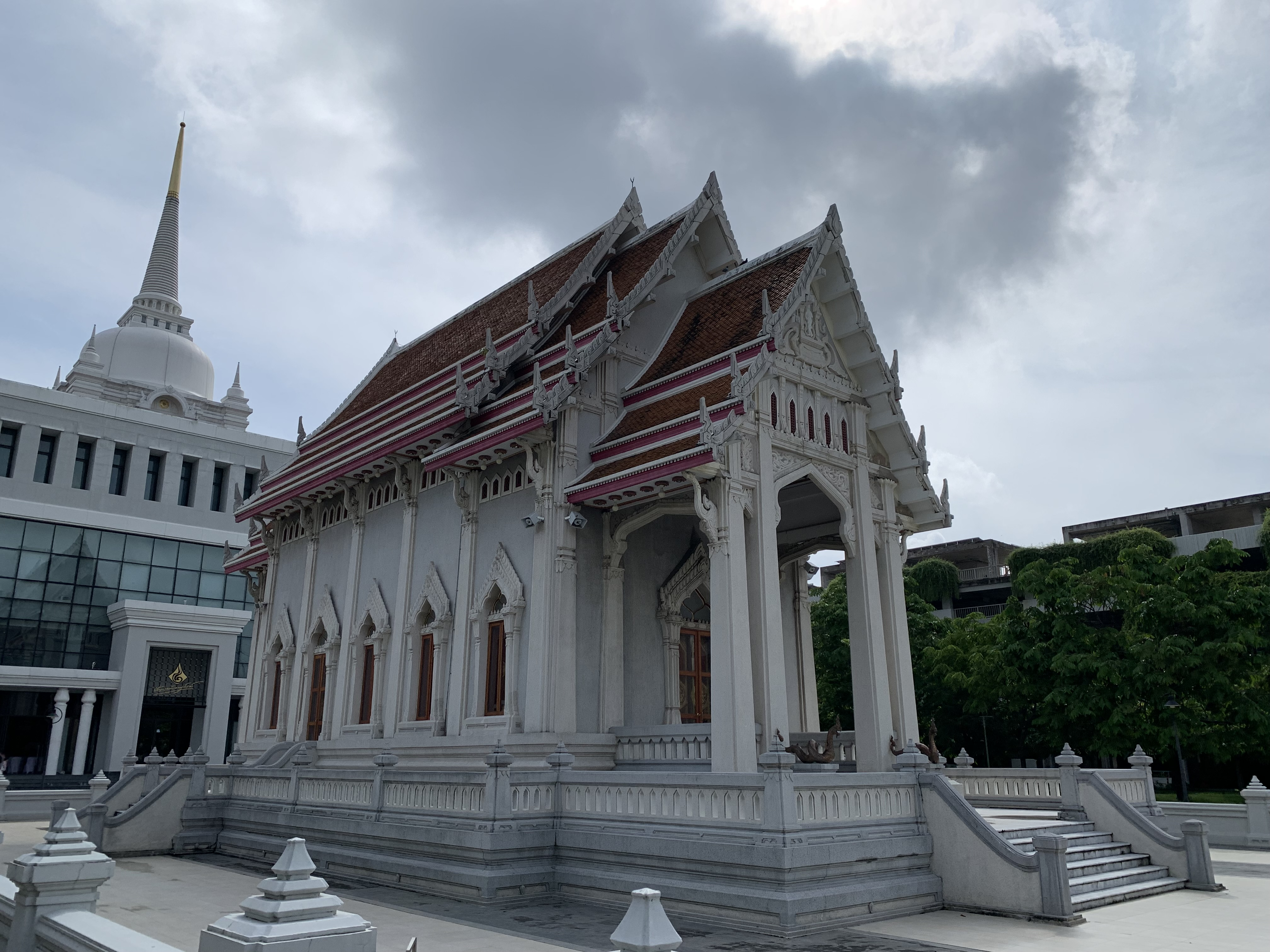

Religion
- Affiliation: Buddhist
- Sect: Theravāda
- Status: Third-class royal temple

Location
- Location: Bang Talat, Pak Kret, Nonthaburi
- Country: Thailand
- Interactive map of Wat Chonlaprathan Rangsarit
- Coordinates: 13°54′04″N 100°30′29″E

Wat Chonlaprathan Rangsarit (Thai: วัดชลประทานรังสฤษดิ์, pronounced [wát tɕʰōn.lá.prà.tʰāːn rāŋ.sà.rìt]) is a third-class royal temple in Nonthaburi province, Thailand.
