= Poson =

Buddhist festival

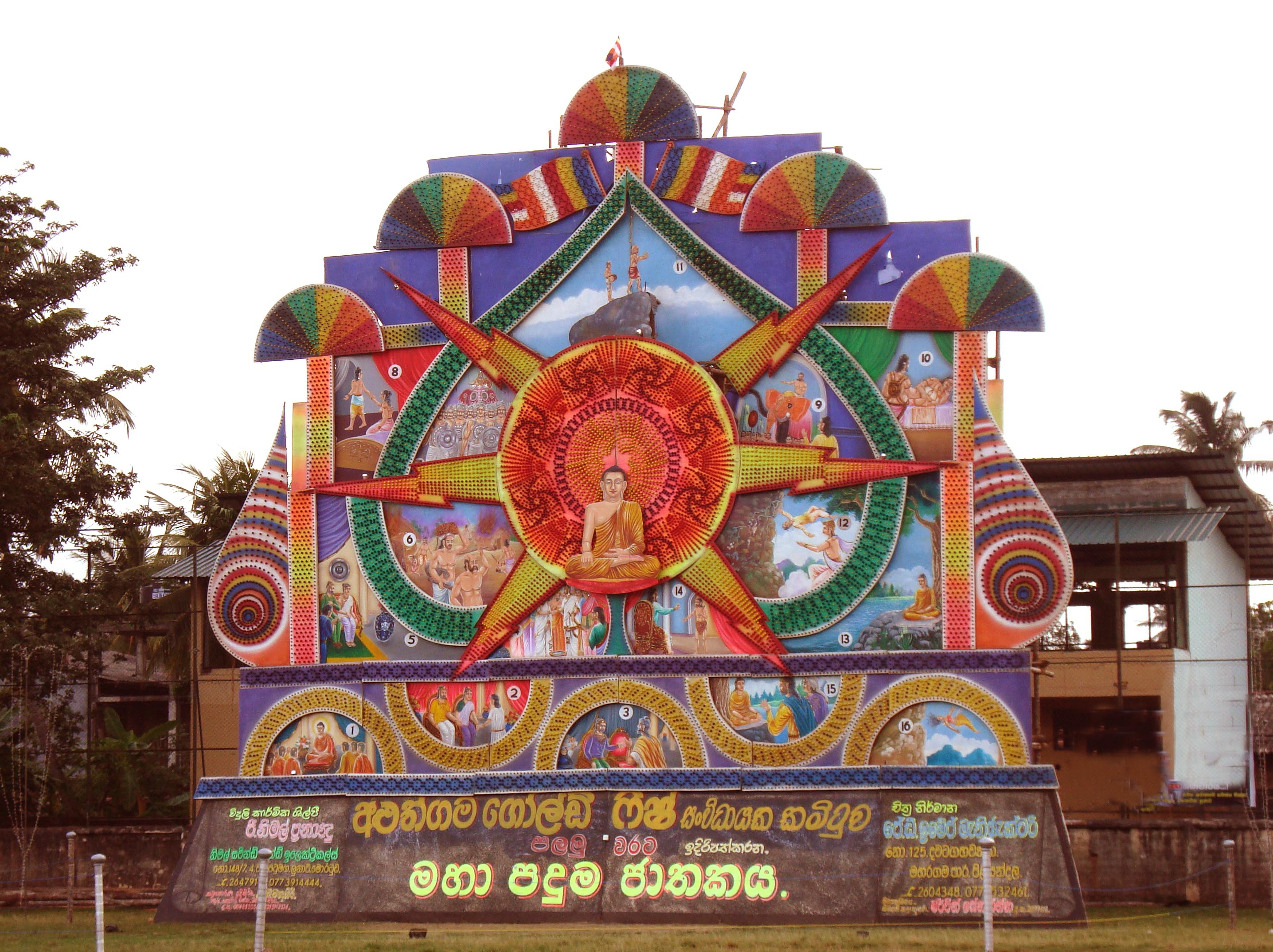
- A Poson pandol at Aluthgama
- Observed by: Sri Lankan Buddhists
- Significance: Commemoration of the spread of Buddhism to Sri Lanka.
- Begins: Early June
- Ends: Early June

Poson, also known as Poson Poya, is an annual festival held by Sri Lankan Buddhists celebrating the arrival of Buddhism in Sri Lanka in the 3rd century BC. The festival is the most important Poya (full moon) holiday of the year and the second most important Buddhist holiday of the year, being surpassed in importance by Vesak. Poson is celebrated throughout the island, with the most important ceremonies of the festival being held in Anuradhapura and Mihintale. The festival is held in early June, coinciding with the June full moon.

== Festival ==
Poson is celebrated to commemorate the introduction of Buddhism to Sri Lanka by Mahinda Thero in 236 BC. The focal point of the religious festival is the Buddhist monastic complex on the mountain of Mihintale, where Arahath Mahinda Thero preached Buddhism to one of the kings, king Devanampiyatissa, of Sri Lanka. Celebrations are also centered around Buddhist sites in Anuradhapura, which was one of the first cities in Sri Lanka to convert to Buddhism. During Poson, these two locations attract thousands of pilgrims from across Sri Lanka. These pilgrims dress in white and worship at the spiritual locales. Many of the most devoted pilgrims spend hours in quiet contemplation to honor the traditions of Buddhism.

The Poson Festival is celebrated throughout the island, where, huge electronically lit Pandols are showcased in various city centres, dansals (free food stores organized by communities) are organized. Houses are decorated with Lanterns, and lights to commemorate the day in a festive manner. The celebrations go on from 5 days to a week starting from the full moon poya day. Some parts of Sri Lanka prohibit the selling of meat and alcohol during the festival.
