= Ajahn Buddhadasa =

Thai Buddhist monk (1906–1993)

Buddhadasa
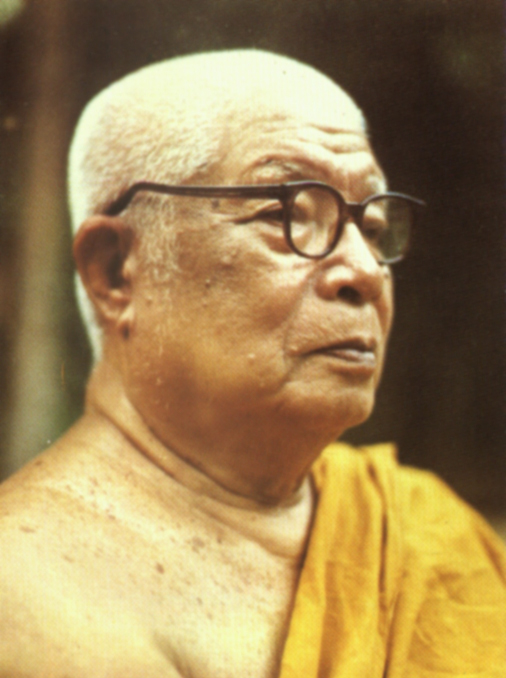

Personal life
- Born: Ngueam Phanit; 27 May 1906 Chaiya, Chaiya (now Surat Thani), Thailand
- Died: 25 May 1993 (aged 86) Chaiya, Surat Thani, Thailand

Religious life
- Religion: Buddhism
- Order: Mahā Nikāya
- School: Theravāda
- Dharma names: Indapañño
- Monastic name: Phra Dharmakosācārya
- Ordination: 29 July 1926 (aged 20)

Senior posting
- Based in: Suan Mokkh

Buddhadasa (27 May 1906 – 25 May 1993) was a Thai Buddhist monk. Known as an innovative reinterpreter of Buddhist doctrine and Thai folk beliefs, he fostered a reformation in conventional religious perceptions in his home country, Thailand, as well as abroad. He developed a personal view that those who have penetrated the essential nature of religions consider "all religions to be inwardly the same", while those who have the highest understanding of dhamma feel "there is no religion". Buddhadasa was also known for his political engagement and developed a form of Buddhist socialism he called "Dhammic socialism".

== Name ==
Buddhadasa was commonly known as Buddhadāsa Bhikkhu (Thai: พุทธทาสภิกขุ; RTGS: Phutthathat Phikkhu). His birth name was Ngueam Phanit (Thai: เงื่อม พานิช), his Dhamma name (in the Pali language) was Indapañño (Thai: อินฺทปญฺโญ; RTGS: Inthapanyo), and his monastic title was Phra Dharmakosācārya (Thai: พระธรรมโกศาจารย์; RTGS: Phra Thammakosachan). He signed his name in several works as Buddhadāsa Indapañño (Thai: พุทธทาส อินฺทปญฺโญ; RTGS: Phutthathat Inthapanyo).

== Biography ==
=== Early years ===
Buddhadasa was born in 1906 in Ban Phumriang, Chaiya district, southern Thailand. His father, Siang Phanit (Thai: เซี้ยง พานิช), was a shopkeeper of second-generation Thai Chinese (Hokkien) ancestry and his mother, Khluean (Thai: เคลื่อน), was Southern Thai.

=== Religious life ===
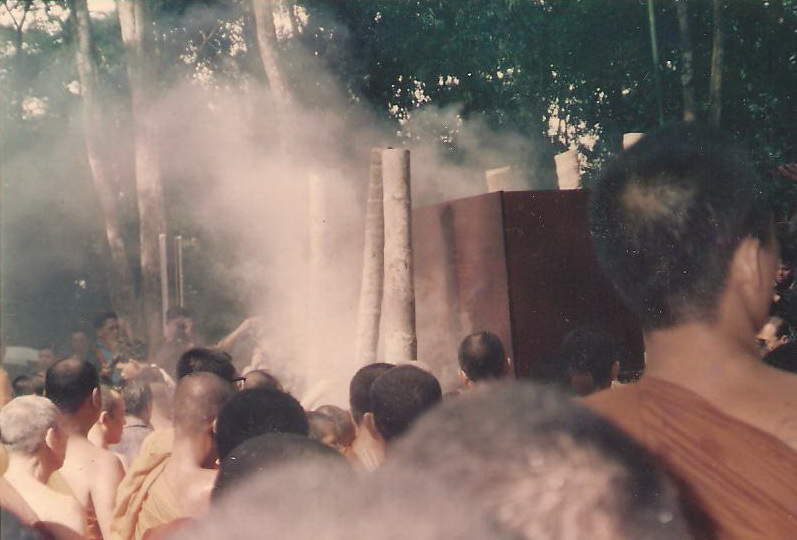
Cremation of Buddhadasa in 1993

Buddhadasa renounced lay life in 1926. Typical of young monks during the time, he traveled to the capital, Bangkok, for doctrinal training but found the wats there dirty, crowded, and, most troubling to him, the sangha corrupt, "preoccupied with prestige, position, and comfort with little interest in the highest ideals of Buddhism." As a result, he returned to his native rural district and occupied a forest tract near to his village, founding Suan Mokkh (Note: From Thai สวน suan "garden" and Pali moksha "release, liberation". Moksha holds the sense of 'shedding ones skin.' See Harris, Moksha: an etymological note, Bauddhamata, 15.6.2009.) in 1932.

In later years, Buddhadasa's teachings attracted many international seekers to his hermitage. He held talks with leading scholars and clergy of various faiths. His aim in these discussions was to probe the similarities at the heart of each of the major world religions. Before his death in 1993, he established an International Dhamma Hermitage Center across the highway from his own retreat to aid in the teaching of Buddhism and other yogic practices to international students. The area of Suan Mokkh was expanded to approximately 120 acres of forest.

However, Buddhadasa was skeptical of his fame; when reflecting on the busloads of visitors to Suan Mokkh he would say, "sometimes I think many of these people just stop here because they have to visit the bathroom."

== Teachings and interpretations ==
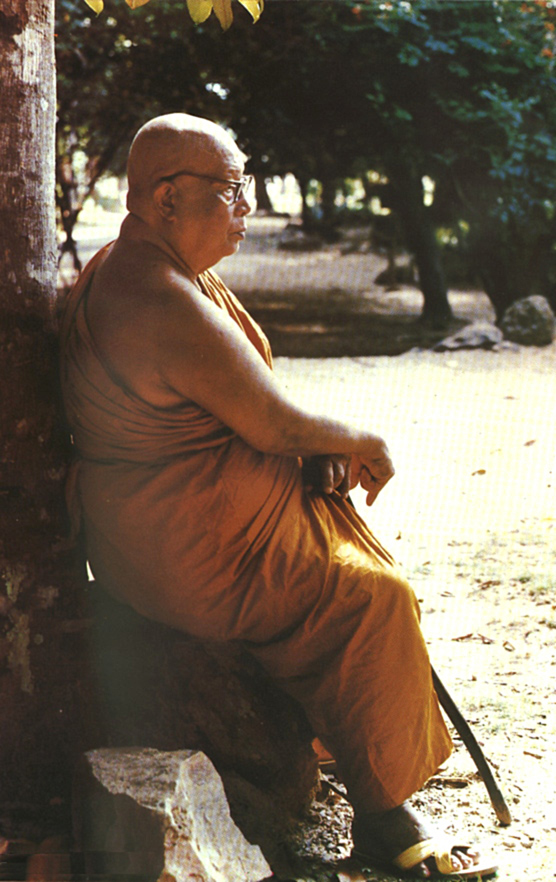

Buddhadasa strove for a simple, pristine practice in an attempt to emulate Gautama Buddha's core teaching, "Do good, avoid bad, and purify the mind." He therefore avoided the customary ritualism and internal politics that dominated Siamese clerical life. His ability to explain complex philosophical and religious ideas in his native Southern Thai attracted many people to his wooded retreat.

His primary teaching mainly focused on the quiet awareness of one's breathing pattern called anapanasati. However, his personal practice was very much grounded in advanced research and interpretation of early Pali texts on the one hand and on his radical private experimentation on the other.

=== Rejection of rebirth ===
Buddhadasa rejected the traditional rebirth and karma doctrine, since he thought it to be incompatible with sunyata, and not conducive to the extinction of dukkha.

Buddhadasa, states John Powers – a professor of Asian Studies and Buddhism, offered a "rationalist interpretation" and thought "the whole question of rebirth to be foolish". According to Buddhadasa, the Buddha taught 'no-self' (Pali: anattā, Sanskrit: anātman), which denies any substantial, ongoing entity or soul. Powers quotes Buddhadasa view as, "because there is no one born, there is no one who dies and is reborn". Therefore, states Buddhadasa, "the whole question of rebirth has nothing to do with Buddhism... in the sphere of the Buddhist teachings there is no question of rebirth or reincarnation". Its goal is nibbana, which Buddhadasa describes as a state "beyond all suffering that also transcends ordinary conceptions of happiness."

Buddhadasa explains paticcasamupadda as the "birth" of "I" and mine through sense-contact with objects, and the resulting vedana ("feeling"), tanha ("thirst," craving) and upadana (clinging). In his words:

The real meaning of the word 'birth' as the Buddha meant it is not the birth from a mother's womb, that's too physical. The birth that the Buddha was pointing to was spiritual, the birth of clinging to 'I' and 'mine'. In one day there can be hundreds of births; the amount depends on a person's capacity, but in each birth the 'I' and 'mine' arises, slowly fades, and gradually disappears and dies. Shortly, on contact with a sense-object, another arises. Each birth generates a reaction that carries over to the next. This is what is called the kamma of a previous life ripening in the present birth. It is then transmitted further. Every birth is like this."

It is by relinquishing the notion of "I" and "mine" that selfish clinging is abandoned, and Nirvana or true emptiness will be reached. This can be done by "not allow[ing] the dependent arising to take place; to cut it off right at the moment of sense-contact."

Buddhadasa's views have been "strongly criticized" and rejected by many of his fellow Theravada Buddhist monks with a more orthodox view of the Buddhist Dhamma. For example, Bhikkhu Bodhi states that Buddhadasa's approach of jettisoning the rebirth doctrine "would virtually reduce the Dhamma to tatters [...] the conception of rebirth is an essential plank to its ethical theory, providing an incentive for avoiding all evil and doing good", summarizes Powers.

=== No religion ===
From the earliest period of his religious studies, Buddhadasa utilized a comparative approach and sought to be able to explain "Buddhist's teachings through other thought systems such as Taoism, Hinduism, Confucianism, Jainism and Natural Science." Through such a methodology he came to adopt a religious world-view wherein he stated, "those who have penetrated to the essential nature of religion will regard all religions as being the same. Although they may say there is Buddhism, Judaism, Taoism, Islam, or whatever, they will also say that all religions are inwardly the same."

In his No Religion (1993) Buddhadasa further famously remarked:

...those who have penetrated to the highest understanding of Dhamma will feel that the thing called "religion" doesn't exist after all. There is no Buddhism; there is no Christianity; there is no Islam. How can they be the same or in conflict when they don't even exist? (...) Thus, the phrase "No religion!" is actually Dhamma language of the highest level.

== Influence ==
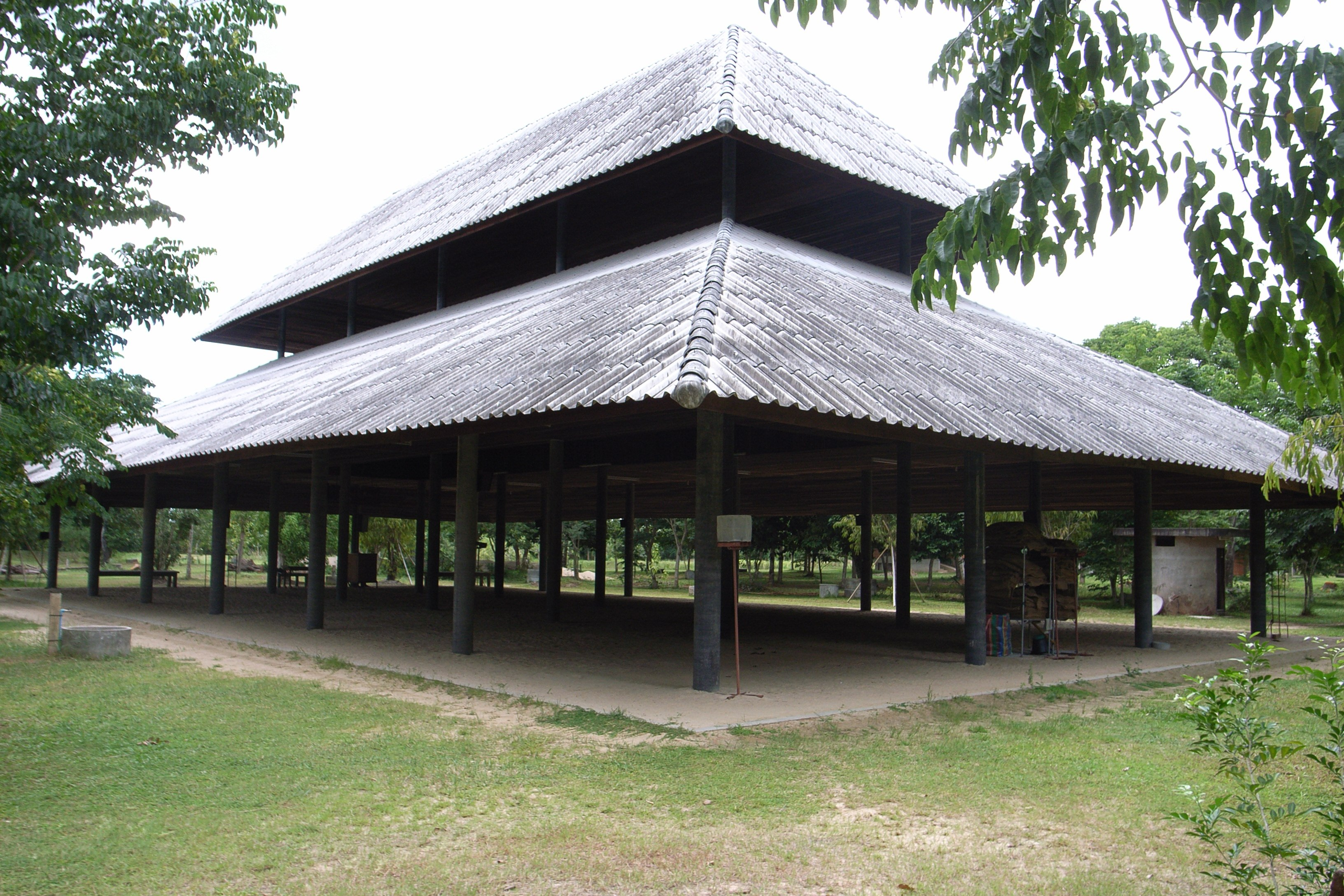
Meditation hall in Buddhadasa's Suan Mokkh (Garden of Liberation) monastery

Buddhadasa's interpretations of the Buddhist tradition inspired such persons as the French-schooled Pridi Banomyong, leader of the Siamese revolution of 1932, and a group of Thai social activists and artists of the 20th century.

Religious scholar Donald K. Swearer has compared Buddhadasa to the early Indian philosopher Nagarjuna, and the 5th-century south Indian scholar Buddhaghosa who has "overshadowed the development of Theravada Buddhist thought" in southeast Asia. According to Swearer, the Thai teacher Buddhadasa "stands in polar opposition to such normative figures as Buddhaghosa" in several respects. Buddhadasa's writings, for example, decidedly contrast with the scholastic and highly influential Visuddhimagga of Buddhaghosa. Buddhadasa has been influential in the arannavasi (forest tradition) of Thai Buddhism, and his ideas have influenced the radical sectarian movement founder Santi Asoke, according to Swearer.

According to scholars such as Peter A. Jackson and Daniel Lynch, Buddhadasa was heavily influenced by the ideas found in Zen Buddhism. Buddhadasa considered the Zen ideas as a way to reconcile Theravada Buddhism with modern humanism, and thought them to be the reason for Japan's economic strength.

It has been contended, that with the decline of Buddhism in Thailand after the 2020 pandemic, good luck blessings and various rituals are becoming once again more popular than the "rationalist perspective of spiritual growth" taught by Buddhadasa, whose teaching is disappearing from Thai pagodas.

== Translated works ==
Buddhadasa's works take up an entire room in the National Library of Thailand. The following are some of his well-known books in English translation.

- The A,B,Cs of Buddhism. 1982.
- Handbook for Mankind Buddhadasa's most well-known book.
- Heart-wood from the Bo Tree. Susan Usom Foundation, 1985.
- India's Benevolence to Thailand
- Keys to Natural Truth. Trans. R. Bucknell and Santikaro. N.d. First published 1988.
- Me and Mine: Selected Essays of Bhikkhu Buddhadasa (preview). Thēpwisutthimēthī, Buddhadasa, Swearer. SUNY Press, 1989.
- Mindfulness With Breathing. Trans. Santikaro. Second Edition. The Dhamma Study & Practice Group. 1989.
- No Religion. Trans. Punno, First electronic edition: September 1996.
- Paticcasamuppada: Practical Dependent Origination. The Dhamma Study & Practice Group, 2002.
- Teaching Dhamma with Pictures Published by Sathirakoses-Nagaparadi Foundation & Ministry of Education, Thailand On the occasion of the Centenary Celebration of the Birth of the Ven. Buddhadasa Bhikku (27 May 1906 - 27 May 2006).
- Fear. Buddhadāsa Indapañño Archives, 2020.
- Seeing with the Eye of Dhamma: The Comprehensive Teaching of Buddhadasa Bhikkhu. Trans. Santikaro and D. Bhikkhu, Edit. Santikaro, Shambhala Publications, 2022.

=== Bodhi Leaf Publications (BPS) ===
- Emancipation From The World (BL73)
- Extinction without Remainder (BL33)

== Sources ==
- Buddhadasa (1985a) [1961], "The essential points of the Buddhist teachings", Heart-wood from the Bo tree
