= Suan Mokkh =

Buddhist monastery in Thailand

- Garden of Liberation
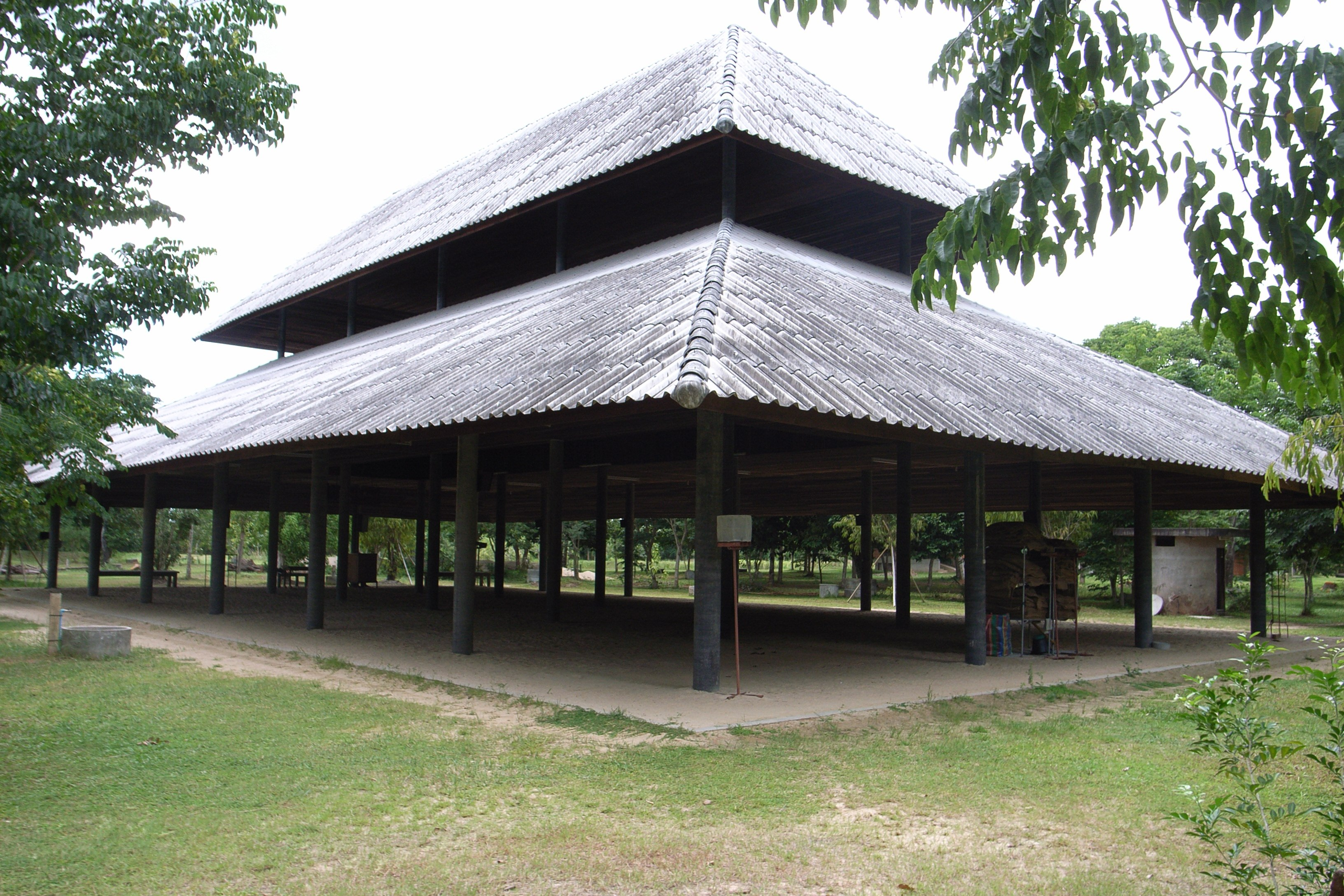
- Meditation hall in Suan Mokkh

- Location within Thailand

Religion
- Affiliation: Theravada Buddhism

Location
- Country: Surat Thani Province, Thailand
- Coordinates: 9°21′37″N 99°10′6″E

Website
- https://www.suanmokkh.org/

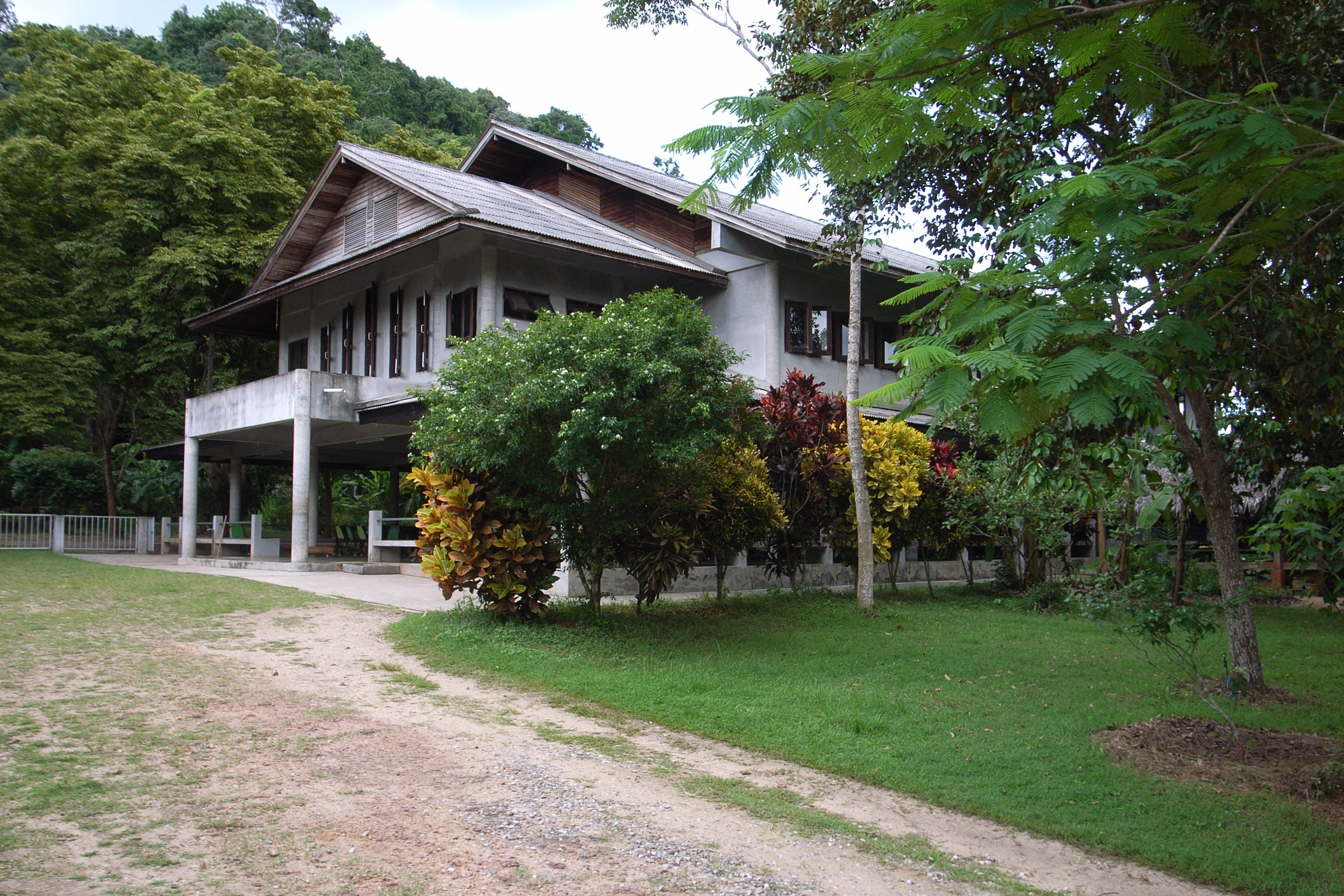
Buildings in Suan Mokkh

Suan Mokkhaphalaram (Thai: สวนโมกขพลาราม, from Pali Mokkhabalārāma, "Garden of Power of Liberation"), known as Suan Mokkh (Thai: สวนโมกข์, "Garden of Liberation") for short, is a Theravada Buddhist monastery, retreat and meditation center in Amphoe Chaiya, Surat Thani, Thailand. It was founded in 1932 by the monk, religious teacher, and social reformer Buddhadasa Bhikkhu, who was a representative and pioneer of Engaged Buddhism.

The site has an area of almost 50 hectares and is largely covered with forest, which sets it apart from the cleared, agricultural surrounding area.

== History ==
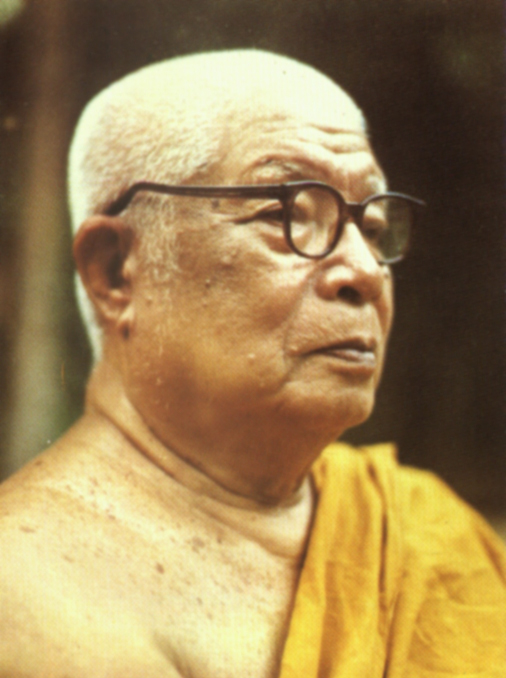
Buddhadasa Bhikkhu

Buddhadasa (actually Ngueam Phanit, 1906–1993), who at that time still bore the religious name Indapañño, returned from his studies in Bangkok to his southern Thai homeland in 1932 and moved into an abandoned monastery (Wat) near his birthplace of Phumriang. He believed that a natural environment was conducive to the practice of the Dhamma. Unlike existing monasteries in the Thai Forest Tradition, he did not want to emulate the teachings and meditation skills of a prominent monk, but rather follow exclusively the Dhamma and Vinaya of Gautama Buddha. He did not see study and practice as opposites, but rather as complements. He sought to abolish the centuries-old differentiation of the Sangha into city monks who studied and performed ceremonies and withdrawn, ascetic, meditating forest monks.

During the first four years, Buddhadasa lived mostly alone in Suan Mokkh, but also visited other wats to teach there. He also published his ideas and insights in the quarterly magazine Buddha-Sasana and gave lectures at the Buddha Dhamma Society in Bangkok. These were characterized by a simple language, without the typical monastic vocabulary, and an intellectual, demythologized interpretation of Buddhist teachings. In doing so, he also attracted the attention of established clergy and laypeople in the capital. At the end of the 1930s, a small group of monks joined him, and others - including high-ranking representatives of the Buddhist hierarchy and state officials - sought him out in Suan Mokkh.

By the early 1940s, the original Suan Mokkh was so overcrowded that it had to be moved to another location. Suan Mokkh II was founded in 1942 in the former Wat Than Nam Lai ("Temple of Flowing Water"), over whose grounds a small river runs and where the remains of a very old stupa were found. Two years later the community moved there permanently.

Suan Mokkh attracted and continues to attract followers and those interested in Buddhadasa's philosophy from all social classes, at home and abroad. In 1972, Tenzin Gyatso, the 14th Dalai Lama of Tibetan Vajrayana Buddhism, visited Suan Mokkh to teach here. In 1989 the facility was significantly expanded and an international meditation center was created. A separate center for nuns was also set up. Buddhadasa died in Suan Mokkh in 1993.

== Buildings ==
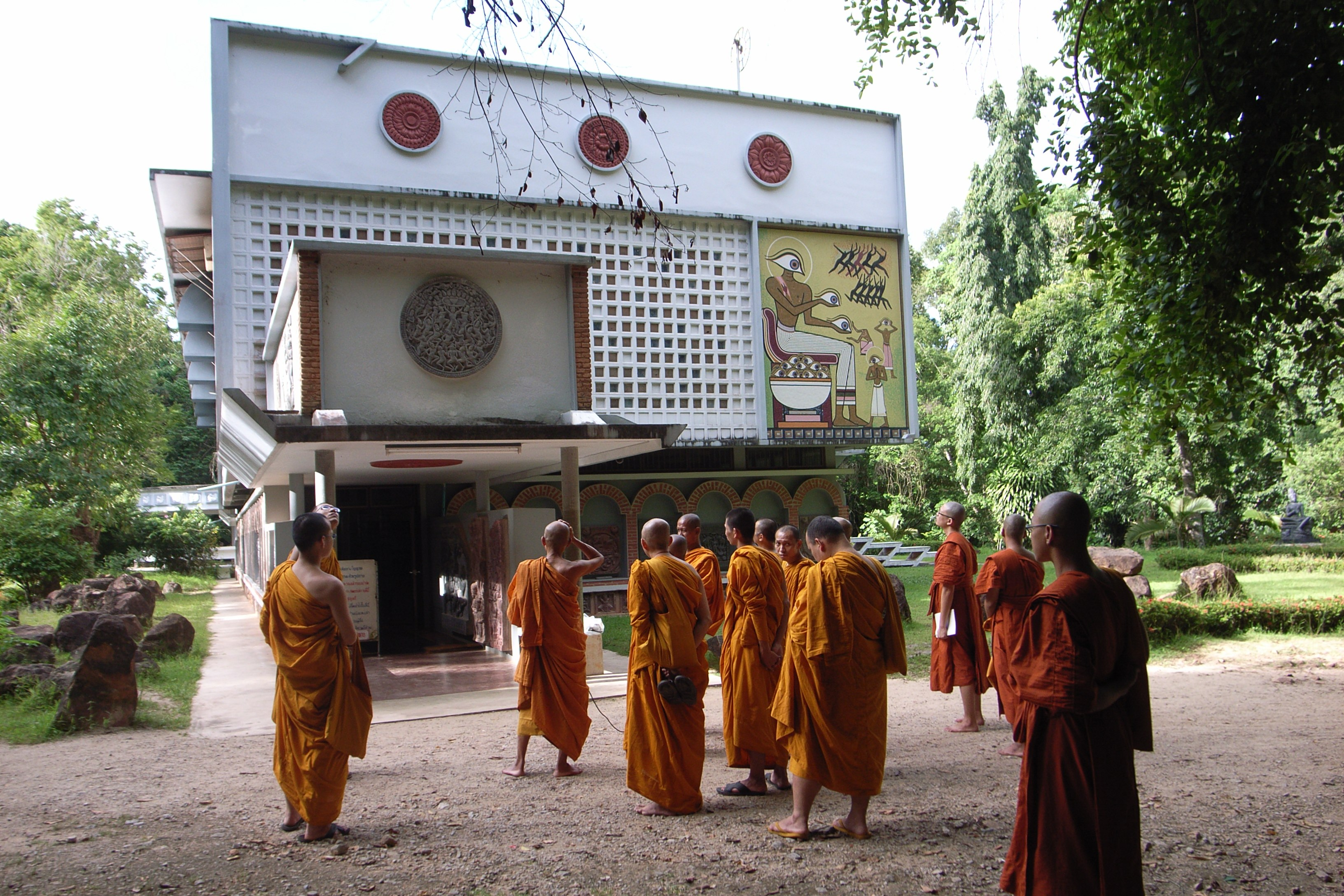
Spiritual Theater

Suan Mokkh includes the original main monastery and the later added International Dharma Heritage for lay people from all over the world. The part for Mae Chis (white-robed women who have dedicated their lives to religion but are not officially recognized as nuns in Thailand) is also spatially separated from the other parts. The main buildings of the monastery, which are used for instruction in the Dhamma, are concrete buildings shaped like boats and are therefore also called "Ships of Dharma". Another central facility is the "Spiritual Theater", in which the teachings of Buddhism are presented visually. There are murals and sculptures in very different styles (Thai, Egyptian, Chinese, Indian, Japanese, Tibetan and European).

The central meditation hall (sala) is open to the sides and its floor is covered with sand. This corresponds to Buddhadasa's ideal of an environment that is as natural as possible. The kutis (monks' cells) are scattered across the site along forest paths. The laypeople's accommodations are just as spartan: they only have sleeping places made of cement with a mat and wooden “pillows”. There are shared water points for washing clothes or body cleaning as well as hot springs for foot baths on the site.

Suan Mokkh is significantly different from ordinary wats (Buddhist temple-monasteries) in Thailand. There is no large Buddha statue and no religious ceremonies are held. The appearance of this retreat is therefore relatively secular.

== Meditation program ==
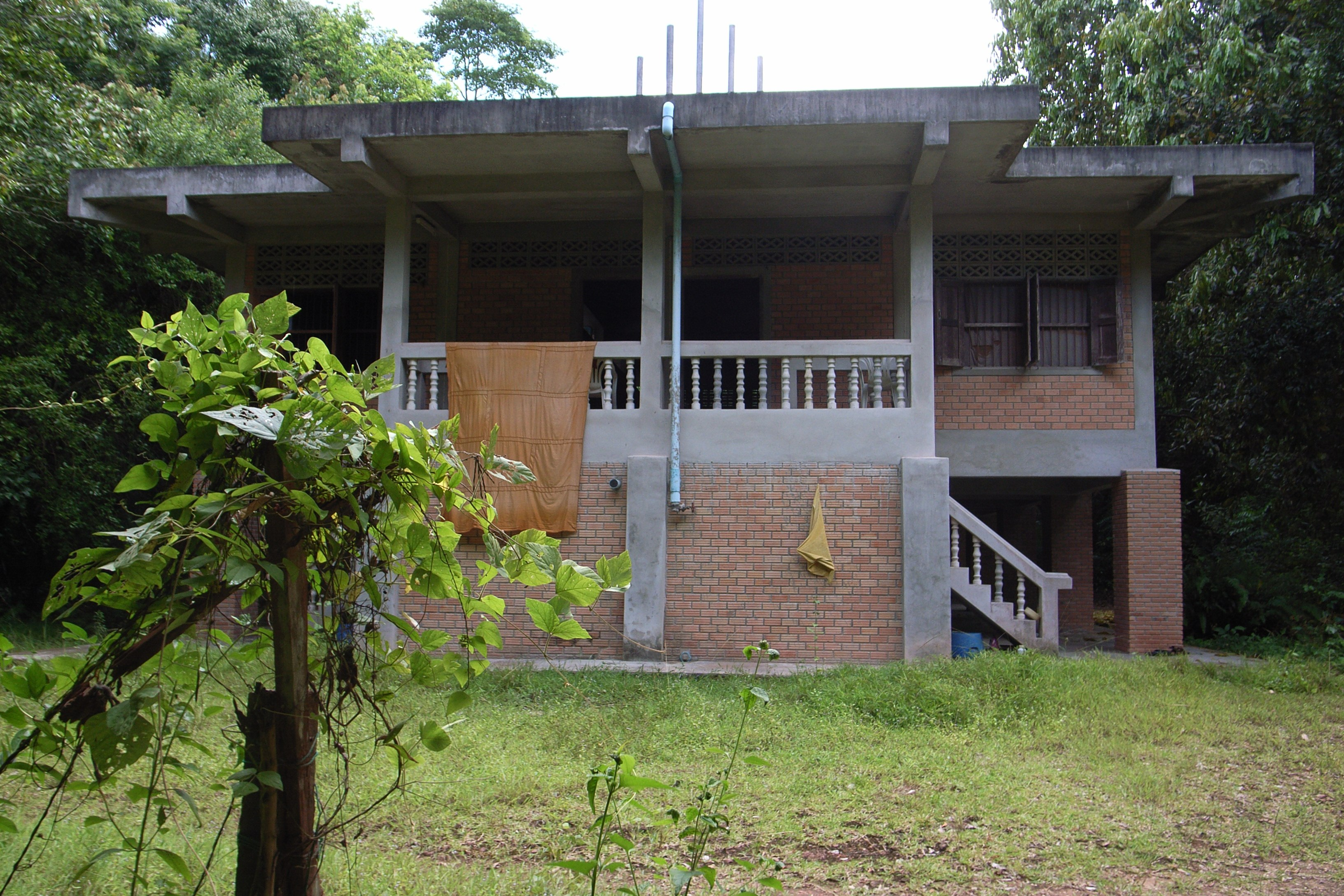
Accommodation for male laypeople

Suan Mokkh International Dharma Heritage (or Suan Mokkh IDH) offers 10 days silent meditation retreat and begins on the first day of each month. Registration is the day before. The Ānāpānasati meditation ("mindfulness of inhaling and exhaling" or "mindfulness of breathing") is taught. Participants walk barefoot, eat only two vegetarian meals per day, sleep on a wooden pillow, and rise at 4 a.m. They are expected to follow the Eight Precepts and remain silent the entire time, not read, write, smoke, drink alcohol or think about anything sexual. The basic principle of Ānāpānasati is to breathe in consciously, feel the breath in the body, breathe out consciously and not think about anything else. The daily routine includes sitting and walking meditation, yoga, lectures on the Dhamma and reciting Buddhist chants, as well as completing the monastery's household tasks. During all activities, including sweeping the yard, washing dishes or cleaning the toilets, participants should continue to pay conscious attention to their breathing.

== Other facilities ==
- Don Kiem Dhamma Hermitage, short Don Kiem (or Garden of Trees): buddhadasa school, community building for foreign practitioners (men only) - south of Suan Mokkh IDH
- Center for nuns - north of Suan Mokkh IDH
