= Buddhists =

Adherents of Buddhism

- The Dhamma Chakra, a common symbol of the Buddhists

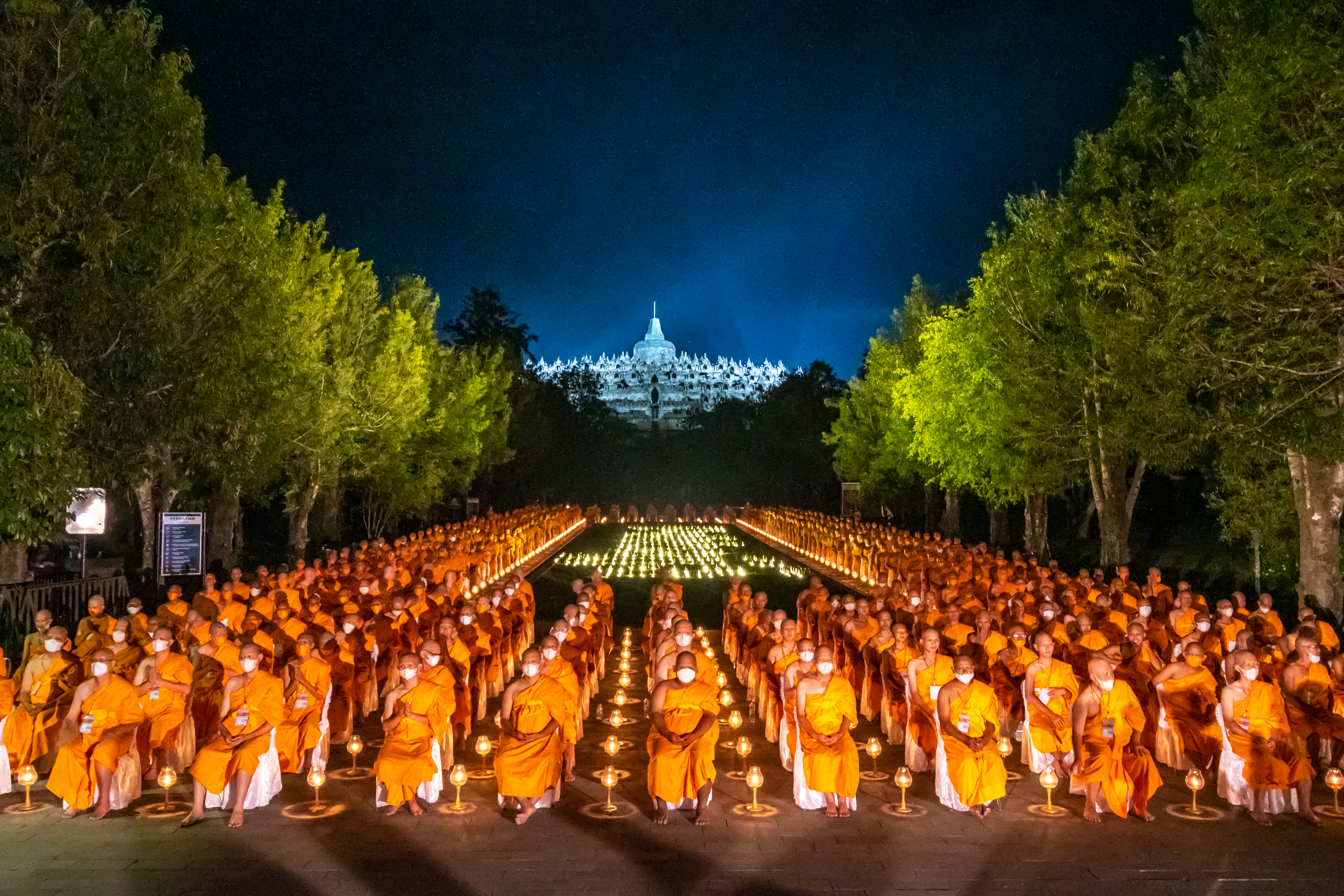
- The Buddhist monks (bhikkhu) meditate in the silence of the night with the magnificent Borobudur Temple in the background

Total population
- c. 320 million (4% of the global population) ▼ (Worldwide, 2020 est.)

Founder
- The Buddha

Regions with significant populations
- Thailand: 67,620,000
- China: 53,380,000
- Myanmar: 47,210,000
- Japan: 46,990,000
- Vietnam: 22,580,000
- Cambodia: 16,240,000
- Sri Lanka: 15,700,000
- South Korea: 9,850,000
- India: 9,550,000
- Malaysia: 6,400,000

Religions
- Mahayana Buddhism (≈55%); Theravāda Buddhism (≈35%); Vajrayana Buddhism (≈10%)

Scriptures
- Tripiṭaka (Pāli Canon), Mahayana sutras, Vajrayana texts

Languages
- Predominant spoken languages: Chinese, Japanese, English, Khmer, Burmese, Sinhala, Thai, Tibetan, Marathi, Hindi, Vietnamese, and others; Sacred languages: Pāli; Sanskrit; Tibetan; Classical Chinese; Japanese

Buddhists, also known as Bauddha, are people who adhere to Buddhism, an Indian religious and philosophical tradition founded by the Buddha in the 6th or 5th century BCE in the Indian subcontinent. Buddhist identity may be religious, cultural, or secular, encompassing ordained members of the monastic community (Saṅgha), lay practitioners, and individuals who adopt Buddhist ethical principles, meditation, or mindfulness practices without formal ritual affiliation.

Buddhists are broadly classified into two main categories: Bhikkhus and Bhikkhunīs, who are ordained monastics and serve as religious teachers, and Upāsakas and Upāsikās, who are lay followers living a household life while supporting and practicing the teachings of Buddhism (see Catuparisā).

In ancient India, followers of the Buddha were sometimes identified as Shakyas, after the clan into which the Buddha was born. The English word Buddhist emerged in the early 19th century, formed from "Buddha" and the suffix "-ist", denoting an adherent of a belief system; its earliest recorded usage in English dates to 1810.

Buddhism comprises numerous schools and traditions, alongside non-denominational and secular forms. The two largest traditions are Theravāda Buddhism, predominant in Sri Lanka, Thailand, Myanmar, Cambodia, and Laos, and Mahayana Buddhism, which is dominant in China, Japan, Korea, and Vietnam.

There are approximately 320 million Buddhists worldwide, accounting for about 4% of the global population. Buddhism has declined in the recent years due to lower fertility rates and rising irreligion in East Asia. Nevertheless, Buddhism has gained cultural and intellectual influence in Western countries, driven in part by growing interest in meditation and mindfulness practices.

By absolute numbers, Thailand constitutes the largest share of the global Buddhist population, followed by China and Myanmar. Outside of Buddhist-majority countries, sizable Buddhist populations are found in India and the United States.

== Etymology ==
The word "Buddhist" is derived from "Buddha", meaning "the awakened one", and was first used in English in the early 19th century to describe followers of the Buddha. In local contexts, early Indian practitioners were called Sramanas (ascetics) or Shramaneras (novice monks), emphasizing renunciation and ethical practice. With the spread of Buddhism across Asia, terms like Fo-zu (China), Bukkyōsha (Japan), and Chos-pa (Tibet) came into use, reflecting local languages and cultural adaptations.

== Terminology ==
Monks, even if bandits were to carve you up savagely into pieces with a two-handled saw, he among you who let his heart get angered even at that would not be [a Buddhist].

— Buddha, Kakacūpama Sutta (MN 21)

The term "Buddhist" is used broadly to describe anyone who follows the teachings of the Buddha, regardless of specific school or region. While the umbrella term "Buddhist" is widely recognized in English language and other European languages, historical and regional variations exist. In early Indian texts, practitioners were often called Sramanas, meaning ascetics, or Shramanas (novice monks), highlighting their focus on ethical conduct, meditation, and renunciation.

With the spread of Buddhism across Asia, different terms emerged to reflect local languages and traditions. In India, followers were known as Bauddha (Buddha followers or Buddhism followers). In China, followers were known as Fo-zu (Buddha followers) or Fanfo (foreign Buddha). In Japan, they were called Bukkyōsha (practitioners of the Buddha's teachings). Tibetan and Himalayan communities use the term Chos-pa to denote those following the Dharma.

Additionally, within Buddhist schools, specific identifiers exist: Theravada Buddhists follow the Pāli Canon and Vinaya (monastic discipline) primarily in Southeast Asia; Mahayana Buddhists follow a diverse set of Mahayana sutras and emphasize the Bodhisattva path, particularly in East Asia; and Vajrayana Buddhists engage in esoteric practices and rituals found mainly in Tibet, Bhutan, and Mongolia.

Modern usage of the term "Buddhist" encompasses both traditional religious practitioners and secular individuals who adopt aspects of Buddhist philosophy, meditation, and ethical teachings without necessarily adhering to rituals or monastic life.

== History of Buddhist identity ==
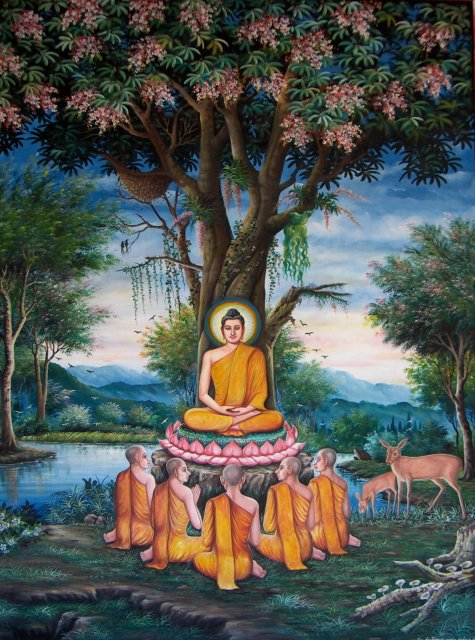
Buddha's sermon in the Sarnath, depicted at Wat Chedi Liam, near Chiang Mai, Thailand

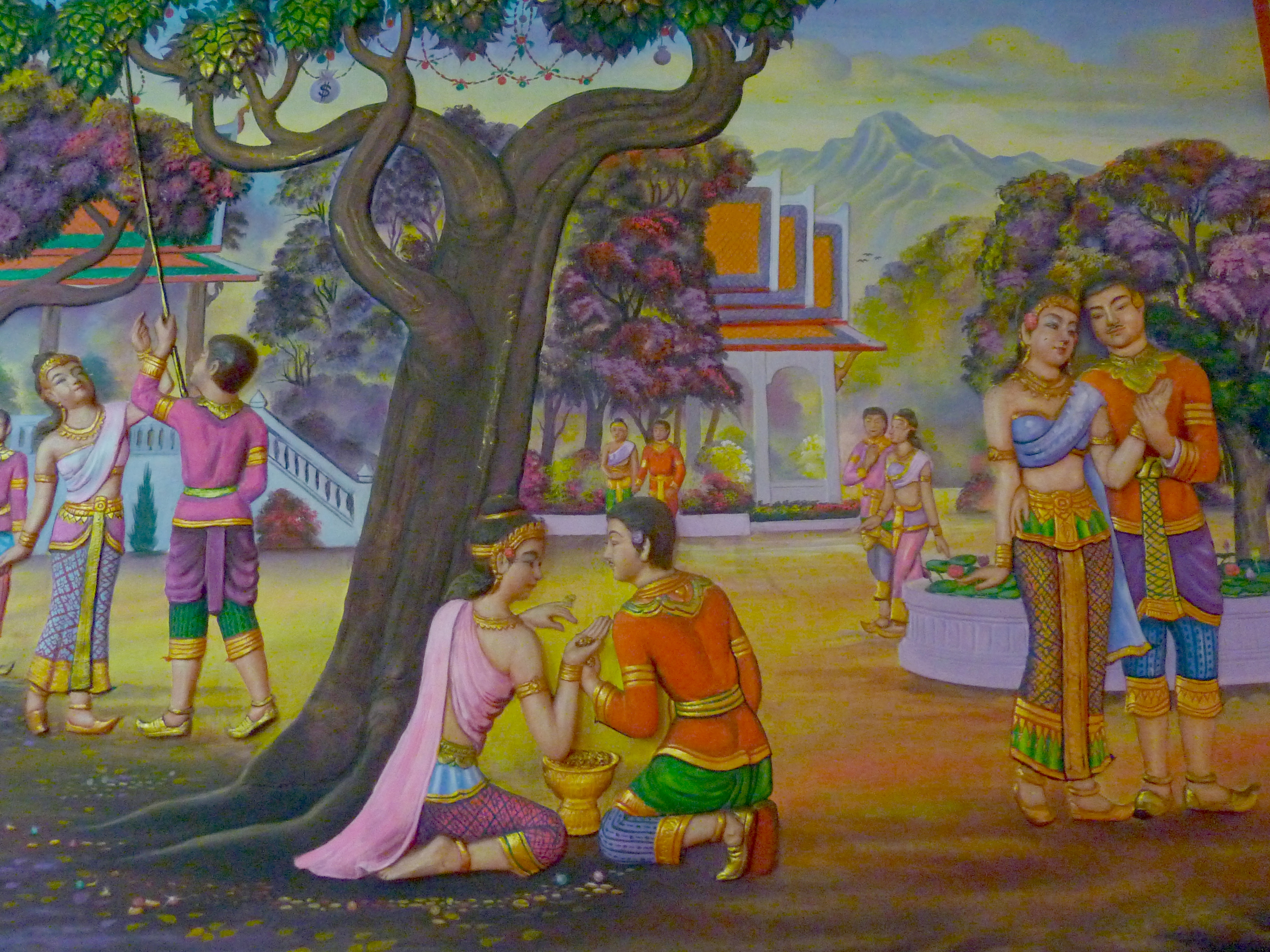
Artwork depicting the scenes of Buddhists' daily life, Tumpat, Malaysia

Buddhist identity has evolved over more than two millennia, shaped by religious, cultural, and political contexts. In its earliest stages in India, followers were identified primarily as Sramanas—ascetics committed to meditation, ethical living, and renunciation—rather than as "Buddhists." After the Buddha's death, Buddhist communities organized around viharas, and identity was often tied to adherence to the Vinaya (monastic code) and the Pāli Canon or Sanskrit scriptures.

As Buddhism spread beyond India along trade routes to Central Asia, East Asia, and Southeast Asia, regional and cultural adaptations influenced the formation of distinct Buddhist identities. In China, Buddhism integrated with Confucianism and Daoism, leading to the emergence of Mahayana traditions, while in Tibet, Vajrayana practices became central, creating a Tibetan Buddhist identity that combined religious, cultural, and political elements. In Southeast Asia, Theravada Buddhism became closely linked with national identity in countries such as Thailand, Myanmar, and Sri Lanka, where kings and governments historically patronized monasteries and promoted moral and social values.

During colonial periods, European scholars and administrators began to categorize followers of Buddhism as "Buddhists," standardizing the term in global discourse. This classification sometimes contrasted with local identities, which were often based on ethnicity, region, or monastic affiliation rather than the broad religious label. In the modern era, Buddhist identity can be religious, cultural, or even secular, encompassing traditional monastic practitioners, lay devotees, and individuals who adopt meditation and ethical practices without participating in formal rituals.

== Origin ==
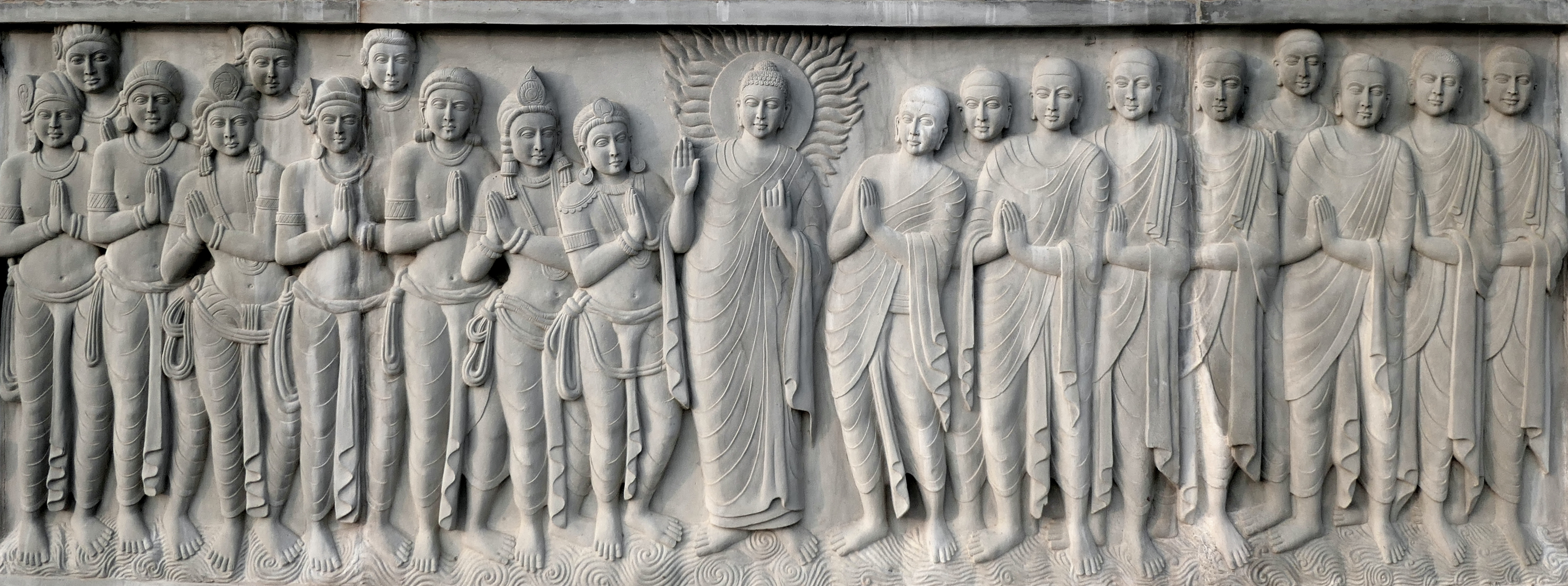
Lay devotees and monastics paying homage to the Buddha

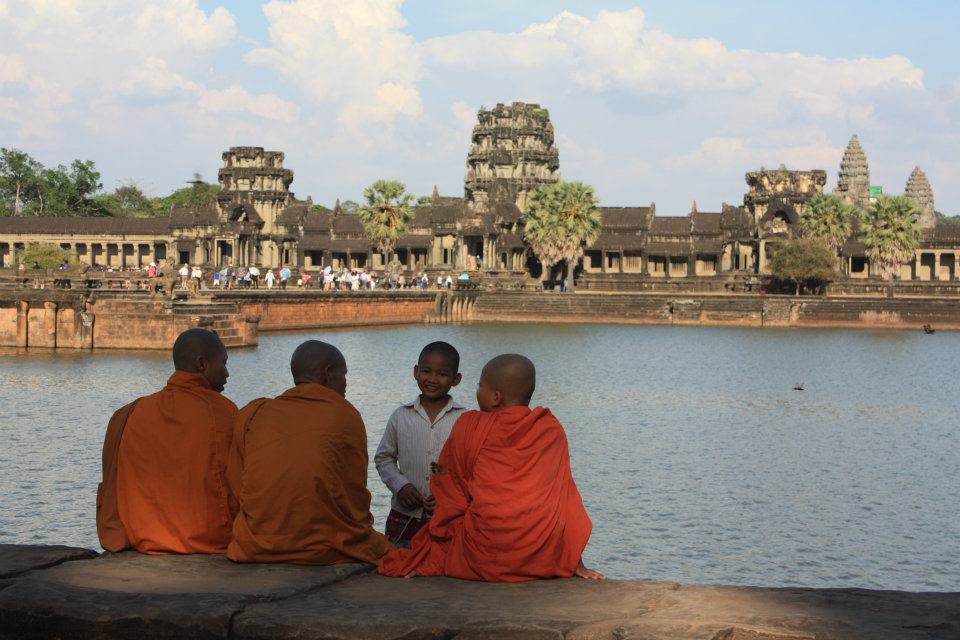
Buddhist monks at Angkor Wat, a significant Buddhist site in Cambodia

The origins of Buddhists as a distinct community can be traced to the northeastern Indian subcontinent during the 6th to 4th centuries BCE, a period marked by social transformation, urbanisation, and philosophical inquiry. Early followers of the Buddha formed both monastic and lay communities, embracing his teachings on the Middle Way, Four Noble Truths, and Noble Eightfold Path.

Early Buddhists included members of the Shakya clan, merchants, peasants, and other ascetic seekers, who were drawn to the Buddha's teachings as an alternative to ritualistic and hierarchical Pali canon traditions. The monastic community, or Sangha, became central to Buddhist identity. Monks and nuns observed the Vinaya (monastic code) and acted as custodians of the teachings, while lay Buddhists supported the Sangha through donations and practiced ethical precepts and meditation.

Buddhism as a movement started in present-day India, where the Buddha studied under various Magadhan (present-day Bihar) śramaṇa teachers, attained enlightenment in Bodh Gaya under the Bodhi Tree, and started spreading his teachings around Magadha. From this Indian origin, his spiritual quest and enlightenment gave rise to Buddhism, which later spread beyond India across Asia and the world. As Buddhism spread, distinct regional traditions and schools of thought developed, influencing the cultural and religious identity of Buddhists. Theravāda Buddhism became established in Sri Lanka and Southeast Asia, emphasizing Pāli Canon study and monastic discipline, while Mahayana Buddhism flourished in China, Korea, Japan, and Tibet, incorporating local practices, devotional rituals, and philosophical innovations.

Buddhist identity and beliefs can vary region to region and absorb local practices. For example, many Hindus believe the Buddha to be the ninth avatar of Vishnu, while Buddhists believe Rama to be a previous birth of the Buddha as depicted in the Dasaratha Jataka, illustrating the mutual influence between Buddhism and Hinduism. Likewise, syncretism between Buddhism and local belief systems like Taoism and Shinto is also common in China and Japan.

Buddhists began to influence Western thought during the 19th and 20th centuries, particularly through the translation of Buddhist texts, scholarly study, and the interest of philosophers, psychologists, and writers. Western adherents often emphasize meditation, mindfulness, and ethical principles over ritual practice, reflecting a philosophical or secular approach to Buddhist identity.

In the 20th century, the establishment of Buddhist centers and monasteries in Europe and North America helped form new Buddhist communities. Figures such as Dalai Lama, Thich Nhat Hanh and Chögyam Trungpa contributed to the adaptation of Buddhist teachings in Western cultural contexts, emphasizing mindfulness, meditation, and socially engaged Buddhism. Western Buddhists often integrate Buddhist practices with psychology, health, and well-being initiatives, including Mindfulness-Based Stress Reduction (MBSR) and related programs. This modern interpretation has led to a pluralistic and globalized Buddhist identity, combining traditional spiritual teachings with secular ethical and meditative practices.

== Demographics ==
Percentage of Buddhists by country in 2010, according to the Pew Research Center

As of 2020, there are approximately 320 million Buddhist worldwide, representing about 4.1% of the global population. Previous reports estimated around 500 million Buddhists globally. These varying statistics were primarily due to how religiosity was defined in East Asia as religious syncretism in countries like China and Japan made it difficult to estimate those who actually practiced Buddhism and those who simply believed in the Buddha.

Buddhists are the only major religious group that declined in size between 2010 and 2020, according to the Pew Research Center, dropping from about 343 million to 324 million people; a decrease of roughly 5%. This decline is largely due to an aging population and low birth rates, along with the fact that many people raised as Buddhists no longer identify with the religion as adults.

The majority of Buddhists reside in Asia, with significant populations in China, Thailand, Japan, Myanmar, Sri Lanka, and Vietnam. Thailand is home to the largest number of Buddhists, estimated at 67 million, including both practicing monks and lay followers who observe Buddhist customs and Buddhist rituals.

Southeast Asia has substantial Buddhist populations, with Thailand accounting for approximately 67 million, Myanmar 38 million, Sri Lanka 15 million, and Vietnam 14 million. East Asia also has significant Buddhist communities, including Japan with around 45 million followers and South Korea with about 11 million adherents.

Buddhism is practiced by people of diverse ethnic and cultural backgrounds. In South Asia, Buddhists are predominantly found among the Sinhalese in Sri Lanka, the Bamar in Myanmar, and various minority groups in India and Nepal. In East Asia and Southeast Asia, Chinese, Japanese, Vietnamese, Thai, and other ethnic groups maintain Buddhist traditions. Outside Asia, the global Buddhist population includes converts and practitioners in Europe, North America, Australia, and other regions, reflecting a growing secular or meditation-oriented form of Buddhist identity.

== Culture ==
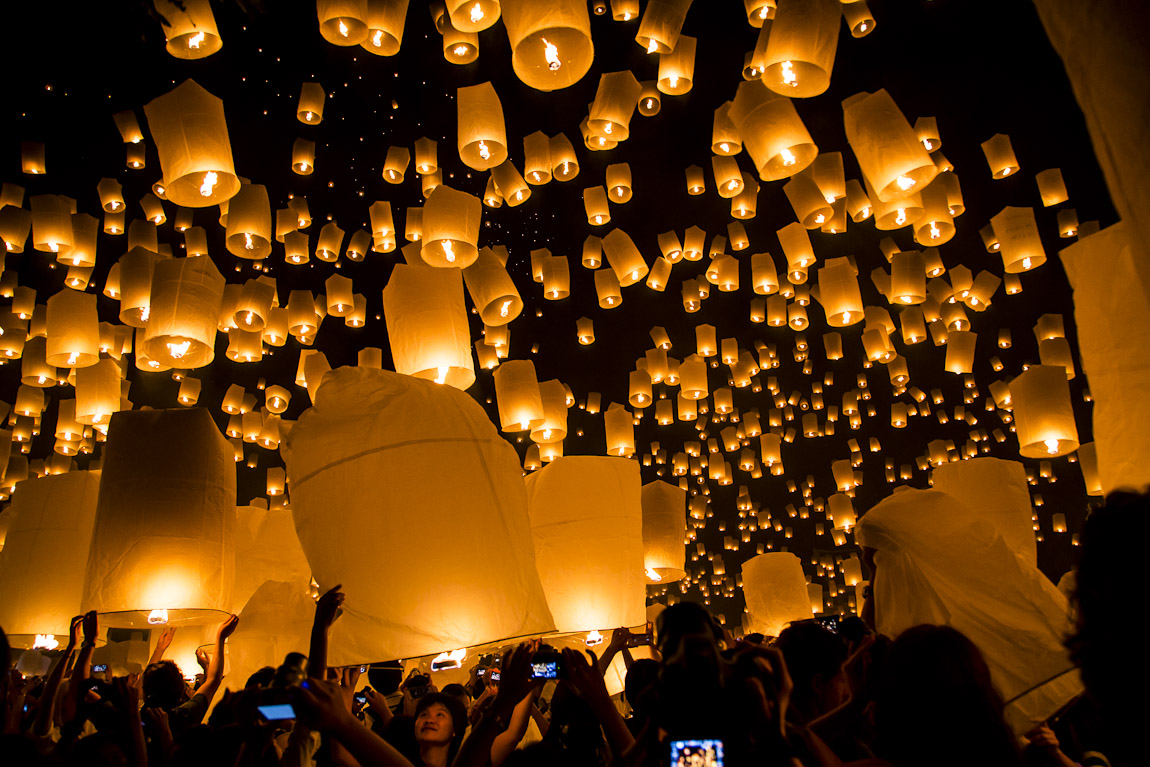
Buddhism ceremony celebrated with sky lanterns, Thailand

Buddhist culture encompasses a wide range of practices, beliefs, artistic expressions, and social institutions that have developed over more than two millennia. Central to Buddhist culture are monastic communities, meditation practices, ethical conduct, and ritual observances. Monasteries serve as centers of learning, spiritual guidance, and community service, often playing an important role in Education, Healthcare, and social welfare in Buddhist-majority countries.

Buddhist literature includes canonical texts such as the Pāli Canon, Mahayana sutras, and commentaries, which provide guidance on philosophy, ethics, meditation, and ritual. Local traditions have produced extensive literature in Sanskrit, Tibetan, Chinese, Japanese, and other languages. Meditation practices, including mindfulness (sati), concentration (samadhi), and Vipassana (insight), form an essential part of daily life for many Buddhists, whether monastic or lay, and have influenced global secular mindfulness movements.

Buddhist culture also emphasizes Compassion, nonviolence, and ethical living, often reflected in social and charitable activities. In many countries, Buddhist organizations provide humanitarian aid, educational programs, and disaster relief, integrating spiritual teachings with practical service to society.

=== Buddhist festivals ===
Buddhist festivals are spiritual and cultural celebrations that commemorate important events in the life of the Buddha, honor his teachings (Dharma), and strengthen the Buddhist community (Sangha). While the dates and customs vary among different traditions—Theravāda, Mahāyāna, and Vajrayāna—all share a spirit of mindfulness, compassion, and gratitude. Most are observed according to the lunar calendar and combine religious devotion with social harmony and acts of generosity.

==== Pan-Buddhist ====
The most widely observed Buddhist festival is Vesak (also known as Buddha Day or Buddha Purnima). It celebrates the birth, enlightenment, and passing into Nirvana of Siddhartha Gautama, the historical Buddha. Observed on the full moon of the month of Vaisakha (April–May), Vesak is marked by visits to temples, offering flowers and lamps, chanting, meditation, and acts of compassion and generosity.

==== Theravāda ====
In the Theravāda tradition, several full-moon festivals commemorate major events in the Buddha's life and teachings, as well as milestones in the monastic year. Magha Puja (Sangha Day), held on the full moon of Magha (February–March), commemorates the spontaneous gathering of 1,250 arahants to hear the Buddha's sermon on harmony and discipline. Devotees light candles, chant, and participate in meditation.

Asalha Puja (Dhamma Day), observed on the full moon of Asalha (July), marks the Buddha's first sermon at Deer Park in Sarnath, known as the “Turning of the Wheel of Dharma.” It is a time for reflection on the Four Noble Truths and for making merit.

Vassa, or the Rains Retreat, is a three-month monastic retreat beginning in July, during which monks remain in monasteries for meditation and study. At the end of the retreat, on Pavarana Day, monks seek mutual forgiveness, and lay followers participate in the Kathina Ceremony, offering new robes and requisites to the Sangha.

Regional Theravāda observances include Poson Poya in Sri Lanka, marking the introduction of Buddhism to the island by Arahant Mahinda Thera, and the Thadingyut Festival of Lights in Myanmar, which celebrates the Buddha's descent from Tavatimsa Heaven.

==== Mahāyāna ====
Mahāyāna Buddhism celebrates a number of festivals that emphasize the Buddha's spiritual milestones and the practice of compassion for all beings. Bodhi Day, held on 8 December, commemorates the Buddha's enlightenment under the Bodhi Tree in Bodh Gaya. Devotees meditate, study sutras, and make offerings of tea, candles, and simple food.

Parinirvana Day (Nirvana Day), observed on 15 February, marks the Buddha's final passing into Nirvana. It is a time for meditation on impermanence and for reading the Mahāparinirvana Sūtra. Ullambana, also known as Yulanpen in China and Obon in Japan, is held in July or August to honor ancestors and relieve the suffering of spirits. Inspired by the legend of Maudgalyayana saving his mother, people make offerings, light lanterns, and chant sutras.

In Japan, the Hana Matsuri or “Flower Festival” on 8 April celebrates the Buddha's birth, when images of the infant Buddha are bathed in sweet tea. In China, the Laba Festival, observed on the 8th day of the 12th lunar month (December–January), commemorates the Buddha's enlightenment with the preparation of Laba porridge and temple offerings.

==== Vajrayāna ====
In Vajrayāna, especially in Tibet and the Himalayan regions, festivals blend spiritual practice with rich cultural traditions. Losar, the Tibetan New Year celebrated in February–March, marks a period of purification, renewal, and joy. Families clean their homes, perform rituals, and participate in community dances and celebrations.

Saga Dawa Duchen, observed on the full moon of the fourth Tibetan month (May–June), commemorates the Buddha's birth, enlightenment, and parinirvana. It is regarded as the holiest month in the Tibetan calendar, during which people undertake pilgrimages, recite mantras, and engage in acts of generosity. Chökhor Düchen, celebrated on the fourth day of the sixth Tibetan month (July–August), honors the “Turning of the Wheel of Dharma,” the Buddha's first teaching of the Four Noble Truths. Devotees engage in meditation, rituals, and Dharma recitations.

== Persecution ==
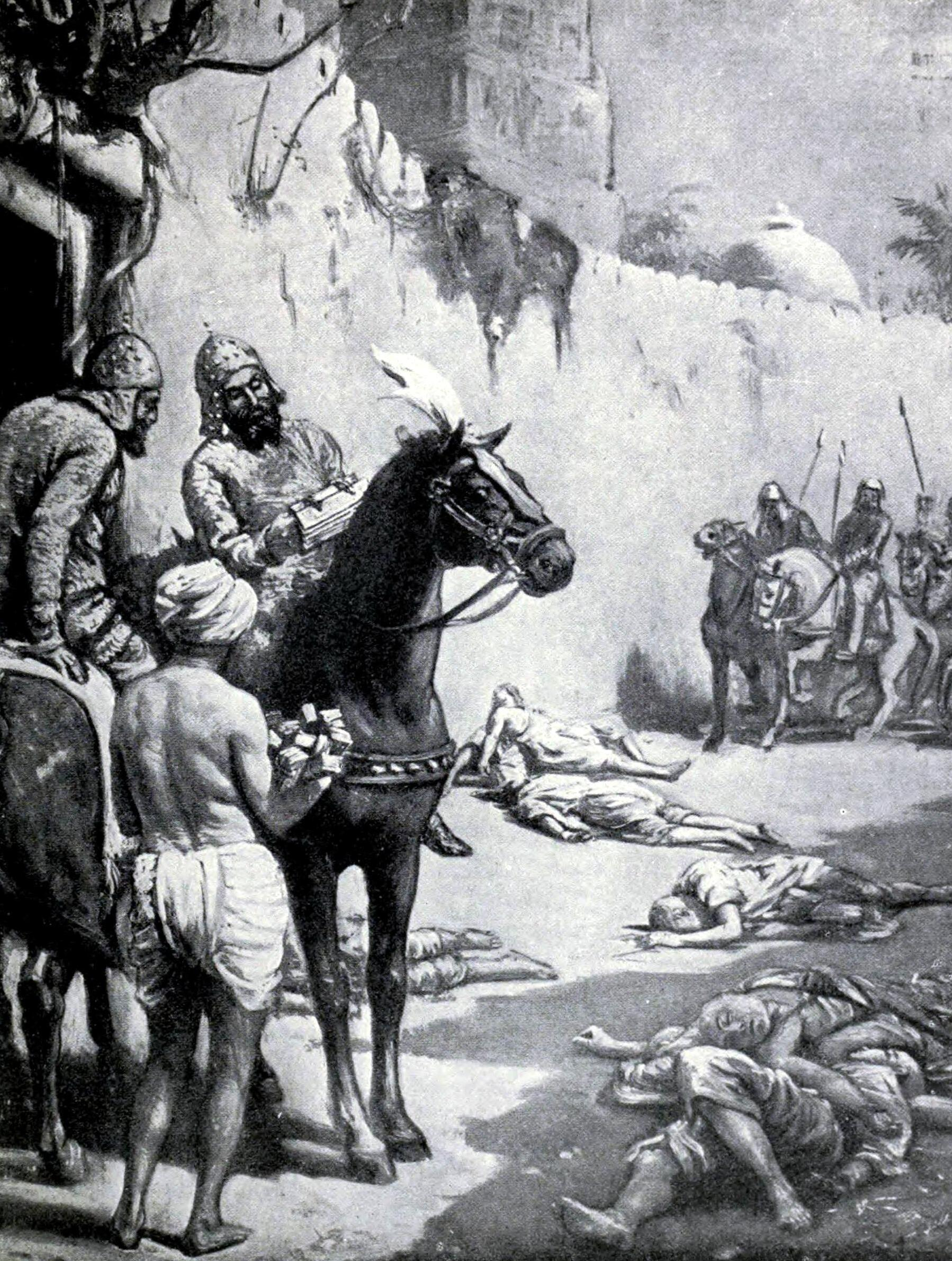
The image, in the chapter on India in Hutchison's Story of the Nations edited by James Meston, depicts the Muslim Turkic general Muhammad Bakhtiyar Khilji massacring Buddhist monks in Bihar. Khaliji sacked numerous monasteries during his raids across North Indian plains.

Buddhists have faced persecution at various points in history, often due to political, religious, or ethnic conflicts. In India, Buddhism declined after the 12th century, partly due to invasions by Muslim rulers and the destruction of monasteries and universities such as Nalanda and Vikramashila. In Tibet, the Chinese invasion of 1950 led to the suppression of religious institutions, imprisonment of monks, and destruction of monasteries, causing a large-scale diaspora of Tibetan Buddhists.

During the Khmer Rouge regime in Cambodia (1975–1979), Buddhism was targeted as a symbol of the old society; monks were defrocked, temples destroyed, and religious practice banned, resulting in the deaths of thousands of monks.

In modern times, Buddhists in countries like Bangladesh, Pakistan, and parts of Central Asia face discrimination and threats as minority communities. Despite these challenges, Buddhist communities have often emphasized nonviolence, resilience, and dialogue, reflecting core teachings of Compassion and tolerance while seeking protection of religious freedom and cultural heritage.

== See also ==
- Householder (Buddhism)
- Buddhism
- History of Buddhism
- Buddhism by country
- List of Buddhists
- Buddhist devotion
- Buddhist philosophy
- Buddhist art
- Buddhist canons
- Buddhist festivals
