= Shiyiyue =

Eleventh month of the Chinese calendar

Shíyīyuè

Chinese name
- Chinese: 十一月
- Hanyu Pinyin: Shíyīyuè
Transcriptions
Standard Mandarin
- Hanyu Pinyin: Shíyīyuè

Korean name
- Hangul: 십일월
- Hanja: 十一月
Transcriptions
- Revised Romanization: Sibirwol

Traditional Korean name
- Hangul: 쥐달
- Hanja: 子月
Transcriptions
- Revised Romanization: Jwidal

Japanese name
- Kanji: 十一月
- Kana: じゅういちがつ
Transcriptions
- Romanization: Jūichigatsu

Traditional Japanese name
- Kanji: 霜月
- Kana: しもつき
Transcriptions
- Romanization: Shimotsuki

Shíyīyuè (Chinese: 十一月) is the eleventh month of the Chinese calendar and calendars based on it, such as the Japanese calendar, Korean calendar and Vietnamese calendar. It follows Shíyuè and precedes Làyuè. It is known in Japanese as Jūichigatsu (Japanese: 十一月) or traditionally Shimotsuki (Japanese: 霜月), and in Korean as Sibirwol (Korean: 십일월; Hanja: 十一月) or traditionally Jwidal (Korean: 쥐달; Hanja: 子月). All of these words can also refer to the month of November in the Gregorian calendar.

In the Tenpō calendar, the last official version of the Japanese calendar, the eleventh month must always include the winter solstice. The same rule exists in the Chinese calendar.

== Names ==
In Mandarin Chinese, traditional names of the month include dōngyuè (Chinese: 冬月) and zhòngdōng (Chinese: 仲冬).

In Japanese, the month is known as jūichigatsu (Japanese: 十一月) or traditionally shimotsuki (Japanese: 霜月). Alternative Japanese names include kagurazuki (Japanese: 神楽月) and yukimachizuki (Japanese: 雪待月).

== Observances ==
- In kabuki, actors traditionally make their debut on the 1st day of the 11th month.
- Shichi-Go-San was traditionally celebrated on the 15th day of the 11th month.
- Niiname-sai was traditionally celebrated on the last day of the 11th month.
- The Dongzhi Festival is celebrated at the winter solstice.

== Dates ==
Below is a list of the start and end dates of Shíyīyuè in the Gregorian calendar. Because the 1-hour difference between China and Japan/Korea occasionally affects the date on which a new moon occurs, the dates below can differ from those of the Japanese and Korean calendars.

Dates of Shíyīyuè
Year	First day	Last day
2016	29 November	28 December
2017–2018	18 December	16 January
2018–2019	7 December	5 January
2019	26 November	25 December
2020–2021	15 December	12 January
2021–2022	4 December	2 January
2022	24 November	22 December
2023–2024	13 December	10 January
2024	1 December	30 December
2025–2026	20 December	18 January
2026–2027	9 December	7 January
2027	28 November	27 December
2028–2029	16 December	14 January
2029–2030	5 December	3 January
2030	25 November	24 December
2031–2032	14 December	12 January
2032	3 December	31 December
2033	22 November	21 December
2033–2034 (leap)	22 December	19 January
2034–2035	11 December	8 January
2035	30 November	28 December
2036–2037	17 December	15 January
