= Bodhi Day =

Buddhist holiday

- Official name: Bodhi Day; Rōhatsu (臘八); Shaka-Jōdō-e (釈迦成道会); Jōdō-e (成道会); Alaw ng Bodhi
- Observed by: Mahayana Buddhists
- Type: Buddhist
- Significance: The enlightenment of Gautama Buddha
- Date: December 8
- Frequency: Annual
- Related to: Laba Festival (in China); Rohatsu (in Japan); Other related festivals: Vesak (in Sri Lanka, Myanmar, Thailand, Cambodia, Laos)

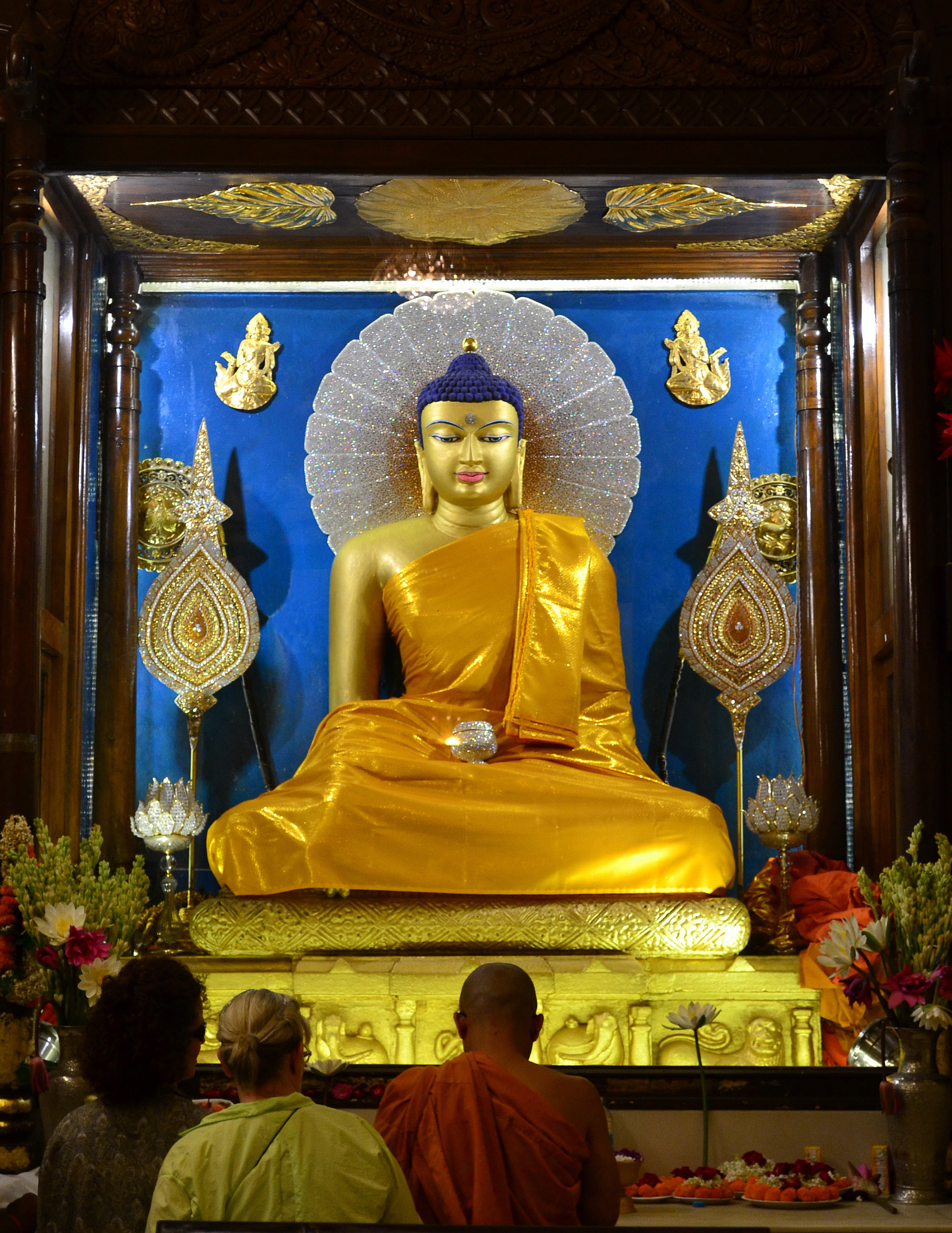
Buddha Enlightenment Mudra

Bodhi Day is the Buddhist holiday that commemorates the day that Gautama Buddha (Shakyamuni) is said to have attained enlightenment, also known as bodhi in Sanskrit and Pali. According to tradition, Siddhartha had recently forsaken years of extreme ascetic practices and resolved to sit under a Ficus religiosa, now known as the Bodhi Tree, and simply meditate until he found the root of suffering, and how to liberate oneself from it.

== Shakyamuni's awakening ==
Traditions vary on what happened. Some say Siddhartha made a great vow to Nirvana and Earth to find the root of suffering, or die trying. In other traditions, while meditating he was harassed and tempted by the god Mara (literally, "Killer" in Sanskrit), demon of illusion.

In the Pali Canon, there are several discourses said to be by the Buddha himself, related to the story. In the Longer Discourse to Saccaka (MN 36), the Buddha describes his Enlightenment in three stages:

1. During the first watch of the night, the Buddha discovered all of his past lives in the cycle of rebirth, realizing that he had been born and reborn countless times before.
2. During the second watch, the Buddha discovered the Law of Karma, and the importance of living by the Noble Eightfold Path.
3. During the third watch, the Buddha discovered the Four Noble Truths, finally reaching Nirvana.

In his words:

My heart, thus knowing, thus seeing, was released from the fermentation of sensuality, released from the fermentation of becoming, released from the fermentation of ignorance. With release, there was the knowledge, "Released." I discerned that "Birth is ended, the holy life fulfilled, the task done. There is nothing further for this world."

All traditions agree that in the third watch of the night, Siddhartha finally found the answers he sought and became Enlightened, and experienced Nirvana. Having done so, Siddhartha now became a Buddha or "Awakened One".

== Festivals celebrating the Buddha's enlightenment ==
The enlightenment of the Buddha is yearly celebrated in many Buddhist countries.

=== Bodhi Day ===
Bodhi Day is observed in many mainstream Mahayana traditions including the traditional Zen and Pure Land schools of China, Korea, Japan, Vietnam, and Taiwan.

Services and traditions vary amongst Buddhist sects, but all such services commemorate the Buddha's achievement of Nirvana, and what this means for Buddhism today. Individuals may choose to commemorate the event through additional meditation, study of the Dharma, chanting of Buddhist texts (sutras), or performing kind acts towards other beings. Some Buddhists celebrate with a traditional meal of tea, cake and readings.

=== Rōhatsu ===
In Japanese Zen, it is known as Rōhatsu or Rōhachi (臘八). In Japanese, the word literally means 8th day of the 12th month. It is typical for Zen monks and layperson followers to stay up the entire night before Rōhatsu practicing meditation, and the holiday is often preceded by an intensive sesshin. It is observed on the Gregorian date of December 8 as a result of the Westernization of Japan during the Meiji Restoration (1862–1869). In Tendai and other Japanese sects, it is called either Shaka-Jōdō-e (釈迦成道会) or simply Jōdō-e (成道会).

=== Laba ===
The Chinese version of this festival is called Laba (臘八) which means the Eighth Day of the La (or the Twelfth) Month of the Chinese Lunar Calendar. It is most often observed in the first half of January, but it may happen on a date between the Winter Solstice (December 22) and the Chinese New Year (between January 22 and February 21).

=== Vesak Day ===
Bodhi Day is not as popularly celebrated as Vesak Day, on which the birth, enlightenment (Nirvāna), and passing away (Parinirvāna) of Gautama Buddha are celebrated.

== See also ==
- Buddhist holidays
