= Little New Year =

Traditional Chinese holiday

- Official name: 小年 Xiǎonián
- Observed by: Chinese
- Significance: Celebration of the Kitchen God
- Date: 23rd or 24th day of the twelfth month of the Chinese calendar
- 2025 date: 22 or 23 January
- 2026 date: 10 or 11 February

Little New Year (Chinese: 小年), also known as the Festival of the Kitchen God, is a festival in the traditional lunisolar Chinese calendar. It honors the Kitchen God and takes place roughly a week before the Chinese New Year. In northern China the Little New Year is celebrated on the 23rd day of the twelfth month of the Chinese calendar, while in southern China it is celebrated on the 24th day.

== Traditional activities ==
=== Sacrifices to the Kitchen God ===
When little new year rolls around, the Jade Emperor decides according to the family's yearly behavior to decide if he will reward or punish them. The Kitchen God serves as the messenger to report back to the Jade Emperor. People burn a paper image of the god in order to dispatch his spirit into heaven to do so and afterwards they put a new image next to the stove to welcome him back in order to oversee and protect the family again. While that happens, sacrifices are made to him in hopes of sealing his mouth and leading him to only saying good things about the family. Sacrifices may include spirit money, sweet food such as cakes and dried fruit, tea, and straw for the Kitchen God's horse. People sometimes throw beans on the roof to represent the sound of the Kitchen God's horse's hooves. Less commonly, people feed beans to the horse.

Traditionally, the sacrifices are only made by men, not women. The god's journey is also marked by fireworks.

=== House cleaning ===
House cleaning happens between the eighth day of the last lunisolar month (when Laba Festival happens) and Little New Year. Chinese beliefs call for folks to clean themselves and their housing since it is said that ghosts and spirits must either return to Heaven or stay on Earth. So to ensure that they leave, people clean every corner of their home. During this time, the house is also cleaned with the goal of reducing infectious agents so the new year does not start with sickness.

=== Eating Guandong candy ===
Guandong candy is a treat made of glutinous millet and sprouted wheat. It is said that if one's mouth was full of candy one would not be able to bad-mouth others. Traditionally, people melt the candy and put it on the mouth of the kitchen god, so that he cannot tell the Jade Emperor anything bad; either he will only be able to say sweet things, his mouth will be stuck together so that he cannot talk, or the candy is simply a bribe. In some areas, people put honey or sticky rice on his mouth instead.

=== Pasting paper cuts on the window ===
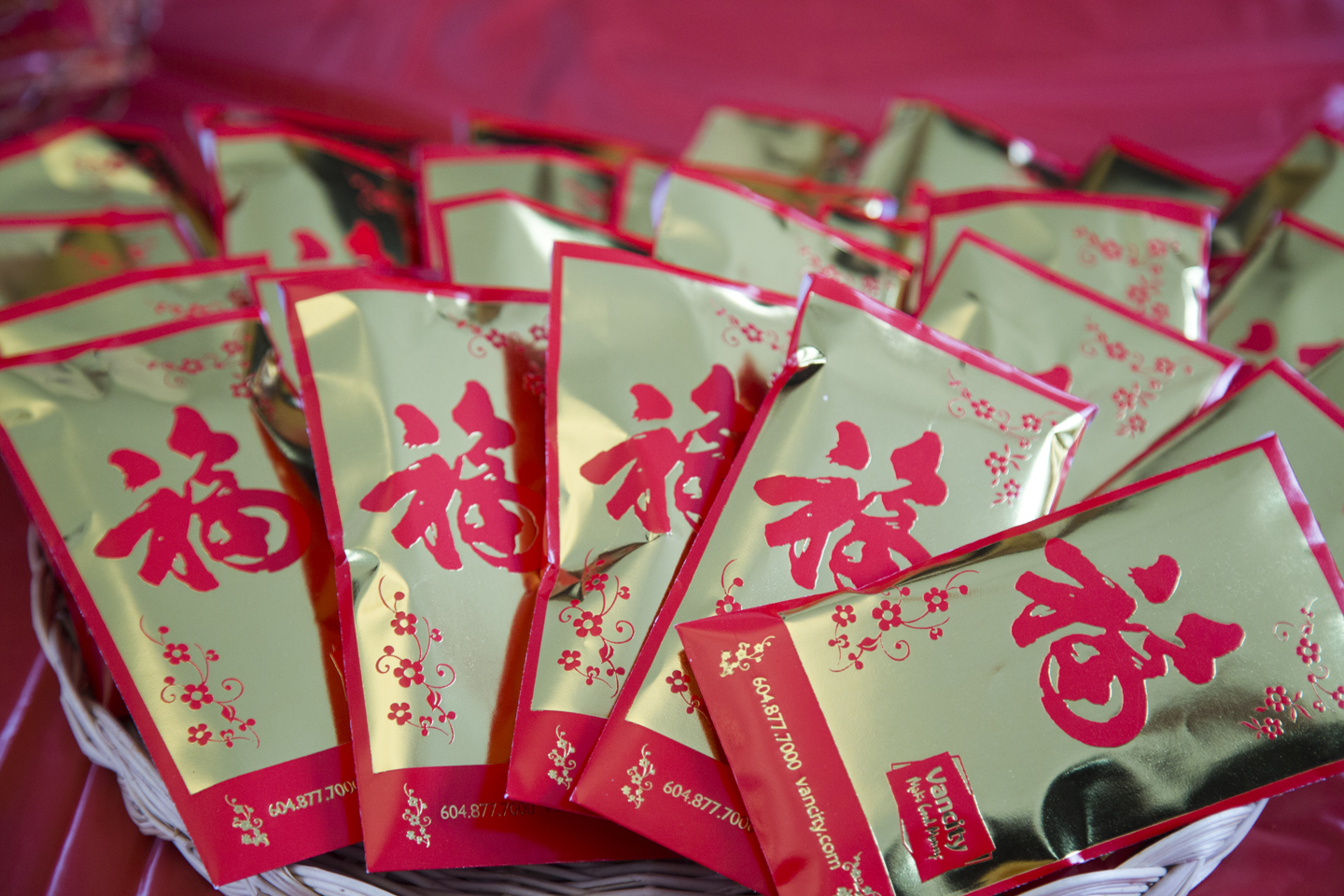
Red envelopes packed with money inside with the character 福 on them.

Similarly to the kitchen god picture, the old paper cuts are taken down and then new ones are put up and it is an indication to the beginning of spring. The paper cuts are usually of the character 福 (fú, 'good fortune') indicating a wish for a lucky year. The cut is also usually up side down since in Chinese "upside-down" (倒挂 dàoguà) sounds similar to "arrive" (到达 dàodá) so they are wishing for luck to arrive.

=== Spring Festival preparation ===
The preparation process has to be all done in advance. There is a wide variety to things to do and prepare with most of them revolving around the word "new", often new clothing. Things like firecrackers are bought to use as celebration. A popular item is the giving of red envelopes since it is the people's belief for the young ones to "respect the elderly" and in return the elderly "love the youth". Commonly the red envelopes have money inside.
