= Layue =

Twelfth month of the Chinese calendar

Làyuè

Chinese name
- Traditional Chinese: 臘月
- Simplified Chinese: 腊月
- Hanyu Pinyin: Làyuè
Transcriptions
Standard Mandarin
- Hanyu Pinyin: Làyuè

Korean name
- Hangul: 십이월
- Hanja: 十二月
Transcriptions
- Revised Romanization: Sibirwol

Traditional Korean name
- Hangul: 소달
- Hanja: 丑月
Transcriptions
- Revised Romanization: Sodal

Japanese name
- Kanji: 十二月
- Kana: じゅうにがつ
Transcriptions
- Romanization: Jūnigatsu

Traditional Japanese name
- Kanji: 師走
- Kana: しわす
Transcriptions
- Romanization: Shiwasu

Làyuè (Chinese: 臘月／腊月) is the twelfth month of the Chinese calendar and calendars based on it, such as the Japanese calendar, Korean calendar and Vietnamese calendar. It follows Shíyīyuè and precedes Zhēngyuè. It is known in Japanese as Jūnigatsu (Japanese: 十二月) or traditionally Shiwasu (Japanese: 師走), and in Korean as Sibirwol (Korean: 십이월; Hanja: 十二月) or traditionally Sodal (Korean: 소달; Hanja: 丑月). All of these words can also refer to the month of December in the Gregorian calendar.

== Names ==
In Mandarin Chinese, traditional names of the month include jìdōng (Chinese: 季冬), jiāpíng (Chinese: 嘉平), chúyuè (Chinese: 除月) and bīngyuè (Chinese: 冰月). The name làyuè refers to a sacrifice called làjì (臘祭) that occurred after the winter solstice.

In Japanese, the month is known as jūnigatsu (Japanese: 十二月). Its traditional name is shiwasu (Japanese: 師走; "priests running"), due to Buddhist monks hurrying from house to house to conduct end-year rites. Other Japanese names include gokugetsu (Japanese: 極月) and rōgetsu (Japanese: 臘月).

== Observances ==
- The Laba Festival is held on the 8th day of the 12th month. Some other East Asian countries celebrate Bodhi Day on the same day.
- Little New Year is celebrated on the 23rd day of the 12th month in northern China and the 24th day in southern China.
- Chinese New Year's Eve falls on the last evening of the lunar year.
- Ōmisoka was celebrated in Japan on the last day of the 12th month.
- The winter great purification was traditionally performed on the last day of the twelfth month in Japan.

== Events ==
Puyi, the 12th Qing emperor of China, issued the imperial abdication edict on Layue 25, 1911.

== Births ==
- Emperor Go-Uda, the 91st emperor of Japan, Shiwasu 1, 1269
- Tokugawa Ieyasu, the founder and first shōgun of the Tokugawa shogunate of Japan, Shiwasu 26, 1542
- Uemura Masahisa, a Japanese Christian pastor, theologian and critic of Meiji and Taishō periods, Shiwasu 1, 1857
- Imperial Noble Consort Shushen, an Imperial concubine of the Tongzhi Emperor, Làyuè 1, 1859

== Deaths ==
- Yue Fei, Yue Yun, Zhang Xian, military generals who lived in the Southern Song dynasty, Làyuè 29_{th} 1141
- Lu You, a prominent poet of China's Southern Song dynasty, Làyuè 29_{th} 1209
- Emperor Go-Hanazono, the 102nd emperor of Japan, Shiwasu 27_{th} 1470
- Lê Uy Mục, the eighth king of the later Lê dynasty of Vietnam, Làyuè 1_{st} 1509
- Yi Gwang-sik, a Korean politician and general during the Joseon dynasty, Làyuè 1_{st} 1563

== Dates ==
Below is a list of the start and end dates of Làyuè in the Gregorian calendar. Because the 1-hour difference between China and Japan/Korea occasionally affects the date on which a new moon occurs, the dates below can differ from those of the Japanese and Korean calendars.

Dates of Làyuè
Year	First day	Last day
2016–2017	29 December	27 January
2018	17 January	15 February
2019	6 January	4 February
2019–2020	26 December	24 January
2021	13 January	11 February
2022	3 January	31 January
2022–2023	23 December	21 January
2024	11 January	9 February
2024–2025	31 December	28 January
2026	19 January	16 February
2027	8 January	5 February
2027–2028	28 December	25 January
2029	15 January	12 February
2030	4 January	2 February
2030–2031	25 December	22 January
2032	13 January	10 February
2033	1 January	30 January
2034	20 January	18 February
2035	9 January	7 February
2035–2036	29 December	27 January
2037	16 January	14 February
