= Laba congee =

Chinese ceremonial dish

Laba
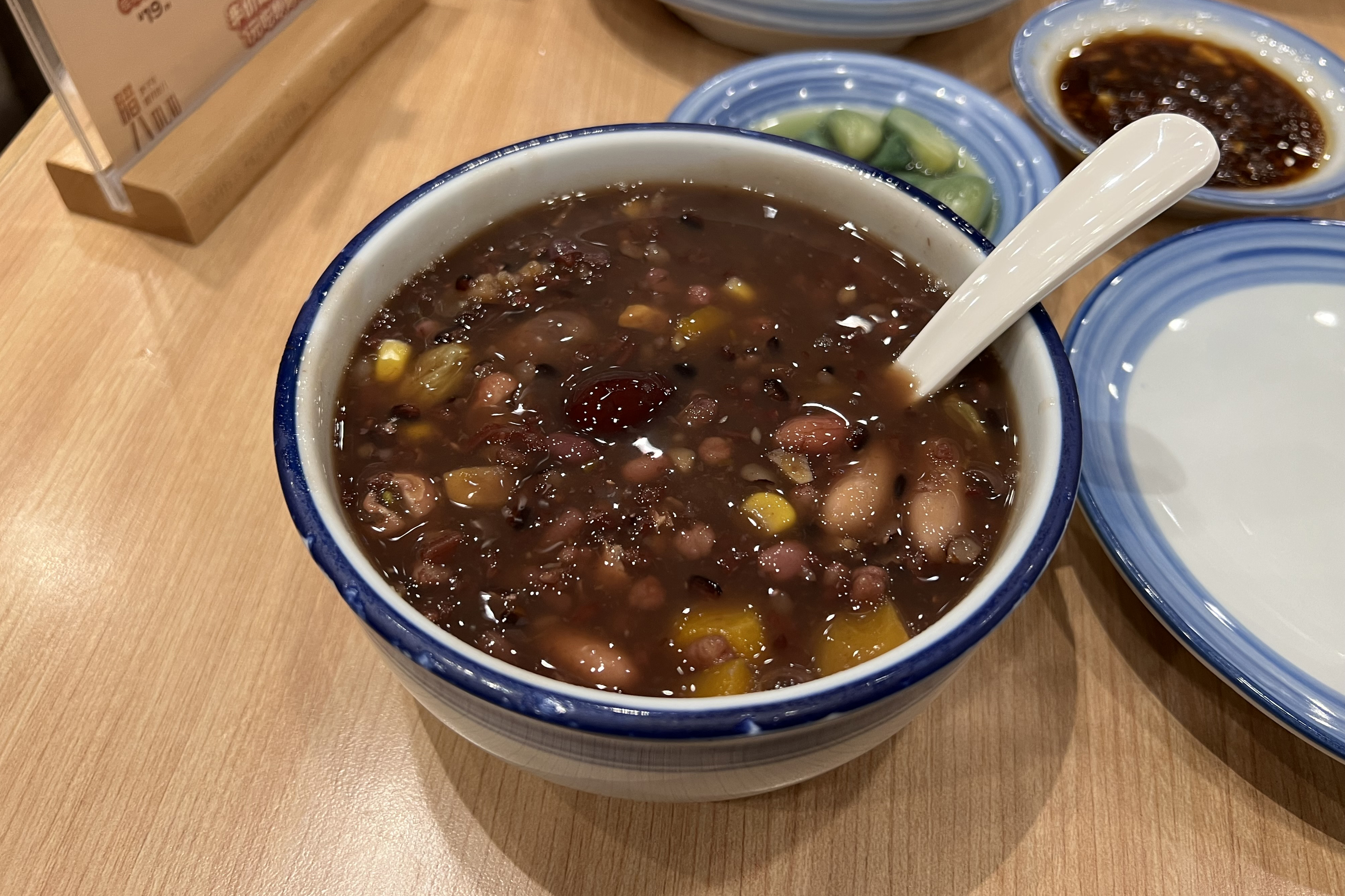
- Laba congee with nuts and dried fruits
- Alternative names: Eight Treasure Congee
- Type: Congee
- Place of origin: China
- Main ingredients: Various rice, beans, dried fruit, etc.
- Variations: Vary depending on geographical regions in China

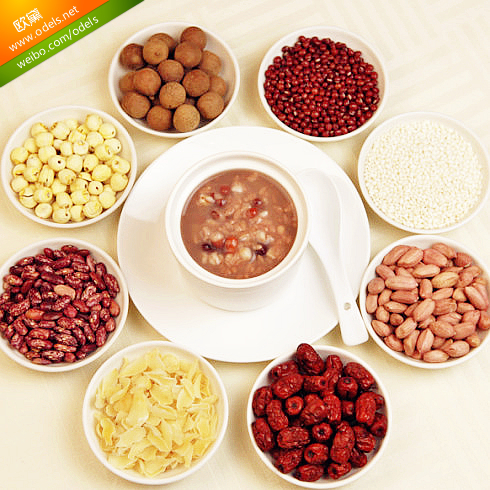
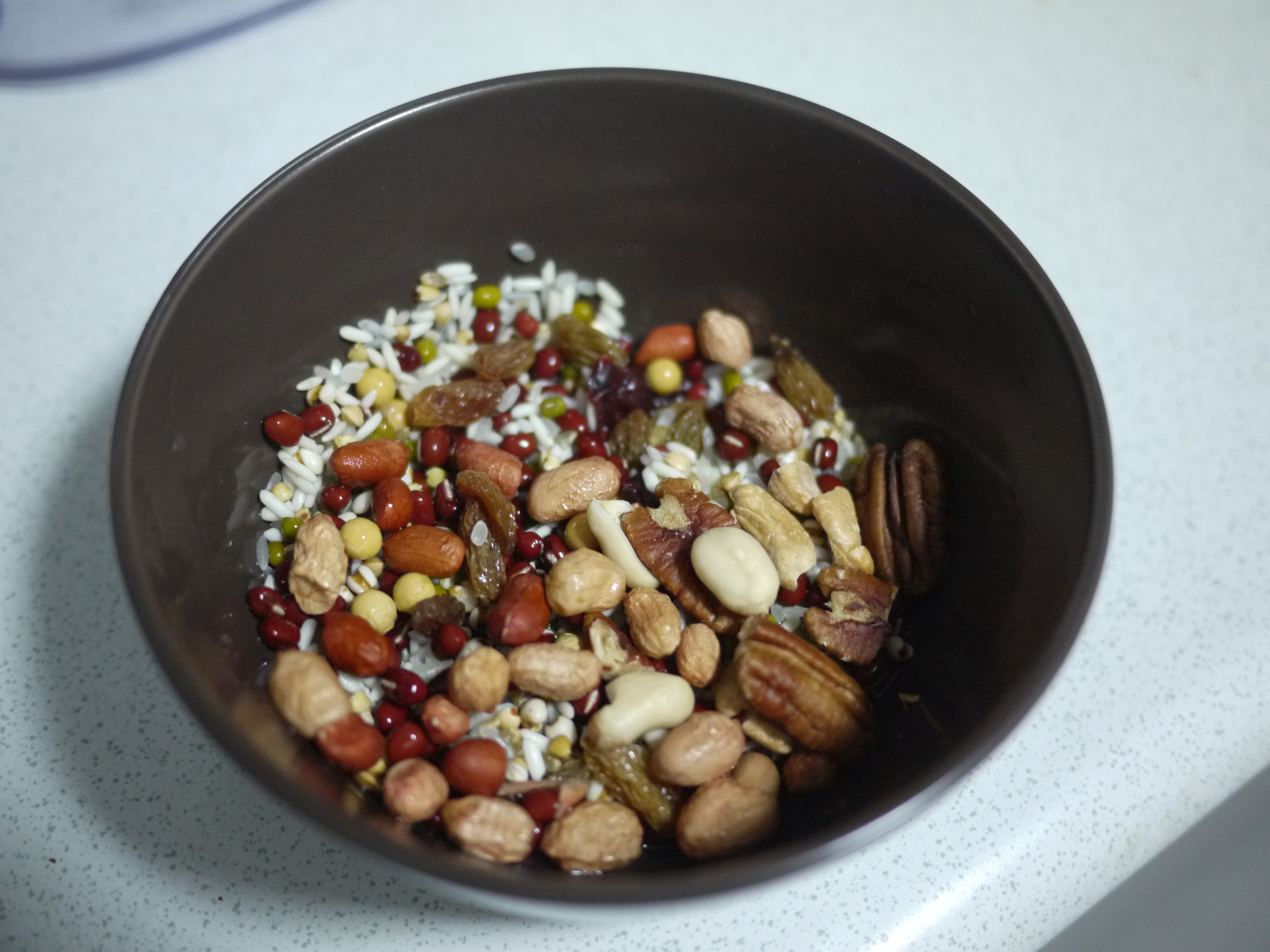
Two examples of the ingredients of Laba congee

Laba congee or porridge (simplified Chinese: 腊八粥; traditional Chinese: 臘八粥; pinyin: làbā zhōu) is a Chinese ceremonial congee dish traditionally eaten on the eighth day of the twelfth month in the Chinese calendar.

The day on which it is traditionally eaten is commonly known as the Laba Festival. The earliest form of this dish was cooked with red beans and has since developed into many different kinds. It is mainly made up of many kinds of rice, beans, peanuts, dried fruit, lotus seeds, etc. Depending on region-based variations in China, it can also include tofu, potato, meat and vegetables.

It is also known as "eight-treasure congee" (八宝粥; Bā bǎo zhōu) and is usually made with eight or more ingredients, representing good luck. Eight is a lucky number in China, and the ba in Laba also means eight.

== History ==
In the Han dynasty, during the Laba Festival, people did not consume Laba congee as it was used for worshipping the gods. In the Northern and Southern dynasties period, the date of the Laba Festival was fixed on the eighth day of the twelfth lunar month. In the Song dynasty, Laba congee was widely consumed throughout China by not only the common people, but also government officials and aristocrats. In the Qing dynasty, the Laba Festival was sometimes celebrated as the "Spring Festival", and Laba congee became even more popular. In the imperial court, the emperor and nobles gave Laba congee to the officials, servants, and others.

== Legends ==
There are several legends in China about the origin of the Laba congee. According to popular tradition, it has been made since the Han dynasty. Some of these legends are:

- The consumption of Laba congee is to commemorate the Song dynasty general Yue Fei, who is widely regarded as a patriot and national hero in Chinese culture.
- In Northern China, because it got really cold in the winter, so it became a tradition for people to drink Laba congee during winter to "stick their jaws" and thus their jaws can "stay attached" to their faces.
- An old woman begged for food from neighbors and was given a mixture of beans and fruit.
- Zhu Yuanzhang (the Hongwu Emperor), the founder of the Ming dynasty, used to live in poverty before he rose to power. He ate congee during those hard times. After becoming the emperor, he asked the people to eat congee as well.
- Siddhārtha Gautama (the Buddha) once attempted to find the right path to awakening by starving himself. One day, when he was starved and weakened, he met a village girl who gave him milk and rice pudding (congee) after mistaking him for a spirit who granted her a wish. He attained enlightenment not long after that incident. (See Gautama Buddha#Ascetic life and awakening for the story.) The Laba congee is thus sometimes referred to as "Buddha congee" to remember this incident and the Buddha's path to enlightenment.

== Regional variations ==
There are many variations of Laba congee in different regions of China. Ingredients can include mixed grains, such as rice, millet, and barley; beans and nuts such as mung beans, azuki beans, lotus seeds, peanuts, walnuts, and chestnuts; dried fruit such as red dates, longan, raisins, and goji berries; and other ingredients such as vegetables and meat.

The version traditional in Beijing uses barley, maize, millet, sorghum, glutinous rice, azuki beans, dried fruit (including jujubes), lotus seeds, chestnuts, and pine seeds.

== See also ==
- List of porridges
