= Laba Festival =

Traditional Chinese holiday

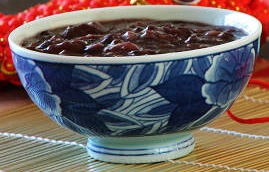
- A bowl of Laba congee.
- Official name: Làbā Jié, Lap Bak Jit (臘八節, 腊八节)
- Observed by: Chinese
- Significance: Celebration of the end of the year, celebration of the enlightenment of the Buddha
- Observances: Consumption of Laba congee, etc.
- Date: Eighth day of the twelfth lunar month
- 2025 date: 26 January 2026
- 2026 date: 15 January 2027
- 2027 date: 4 January 2028
- 2028 date: 22 January 2029
- Related to: Bodhi Day; Rohatsu (in Japan); Other related festivals Vesak (in Sri Lanka, Myanmar, Thailand, Cambodia, Laos)

Laba Festival
- Traditional Chinese: 臘八
- Simplified Chinese: 腊八
- Literal meaning: "Eighth of La"
Transcriptions
Standard Mandarin
- Hanyu Pinyin: Làbā
- IPA: [lâ.pá]
Yue: Cantonese
- Yale Romanization: Laahp-baat
- Jyutping: Laap^{6}-baat^{3}
- IPA: [lap̚˨ pat̚˧]

The Laba Festival (Chinese: 臘八節) is a traditional Chinese holiday celebrated on the eighth day of the month of La, the twelfth month of the Chinese calendar. It is the beginning of the Chinese New Year period. It is customary on this day to eat Laba congee.

Laba Festival was not on a fixed day until the Southern and Northern dynasties, when it was influenced by Buddhism and was fixed on the eighth day of twelfth month, which was also the enlightenment day of the Buddha. Therefore, many customs of the Laba Festival are related to Buddhism. It corresponds directly to the Japanese Rohatsu and the South Asian Bodhi Day.

== History ==
The Laba Festival's name represents its date on the Chinese calendar. La is the name of the twelfth and final month, and ba means "eight". In ancient China, the "eight" referred to making sacrifices to eight gods at the end of the year.

In its original form, the festival was celebrated by making sacrifices to gods and ancestors to wish for good fortune, health, safety, and a good harvest in the new year. The word la originally referred to these sacrifices.

After Buddhism spread to China during the first century CE, the festival was used as commemoration of Gautama Buddha's enlightenment. It was given a fixed date (the eighth day of the twelfth month) during the Northern and Southern dynasties.

During the Qing dynasty, ceremonies for the Laba festival were held at the Yonghe Temple in Beijing.

== Customs ==
Laba Festival is considered the prelude to Chinese New Year, which falls about three weeks later.

An old custom is beating drums to drive away diseases. This practice, which originated from ancient traditions of witchcraft, is still observed in places such as Xinhua, Hunan.

=== Laba congee ===
Traditionally, the consumption of Laba congee is an important element of the festival. There are multiple legendary accounts of the dish's origins. One story says that it originated in the Song dynasty with Buddhist monasteries giving congee to people in honor of the story that Sakyamuni (Gautama Buddha) reached enlightenment on the eighth day of the twelfth month after eating congee.

Laba congee or Laba porridge (臘八粥; Làbāzhōu) is very popular in many places in China. Different kinds of rice, beans, nuts and dried fruits are the main ingredients. People believe that it's good for health in the winter.

It is also known as "eight-treasure congee" (八宝粥; Bā bǎo zhōu) and is usually made with eight or more ingredients, representing good luck. Eight is a lucky number in China, and the ba in Laba also means eight.

There are many variations of Laba congee in different regions of China. Ingredients can include mixed grains, such as rice, millet, and barley; beans and nuts such as mung beans, azuki beans, lotus seeds, peanuts, walnuts, and chestnuts; dried fruit such as red dates, longan, raisins, and goji berries; and other ingredients such as vegetables and meat.

=== Laba garlic ===
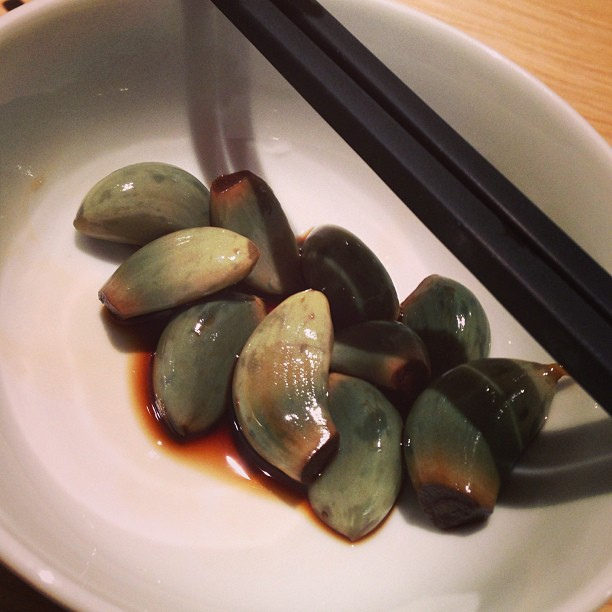
Laba garlic

Another Laba food is Laba garlic, which is particularly popular in northern China. Garlic in Chinese (蒜; suàn) has the same pronunciation as calculate (算; suàn), and it is said that on the Laba Festival businesses should balance their books and calculate their revenues and expenditures for the year. Laba garlic is made by soaking garlic in vinegar. Laba garlic is soaked in vinegar from the Laba Festival until Chinese New Year. The garlic and vinegar are then used alongside Chinese dumplings (jiaozi) around Chinese New Year.

== In popular culture ==
The festival is relevant to the plot of Jin Yong's novel Ode to Gallantry.

In 2011, Google published a Google Doodle commemorating the festival.

== See also ==
- Little New Year
