= Chinese calendar =

Lunisolar calendar

- Traditional Chinese: 農曆
- Simplified Chinese: 农历
- Literal meaning: "agricultural calendar"
Transcriptions
Standard Mandarin
- Hanyu Pinyin: nónglì
- Bopomofo: ㄋㄨㄥˊ ㄌㄧˋ
- Wade–Giles: nung^{2} li^{4}
- Tongyong Pinyin: nóng-lì
- IPA: [nʊ̌ŋ.lî]
Yue: Cantonese
- Jyutping: nung4 lik6
- IPA: [nʊŋ˩ lɪk̚˨]

Today (at UTC+00)
- Sunday, 22 November 2026
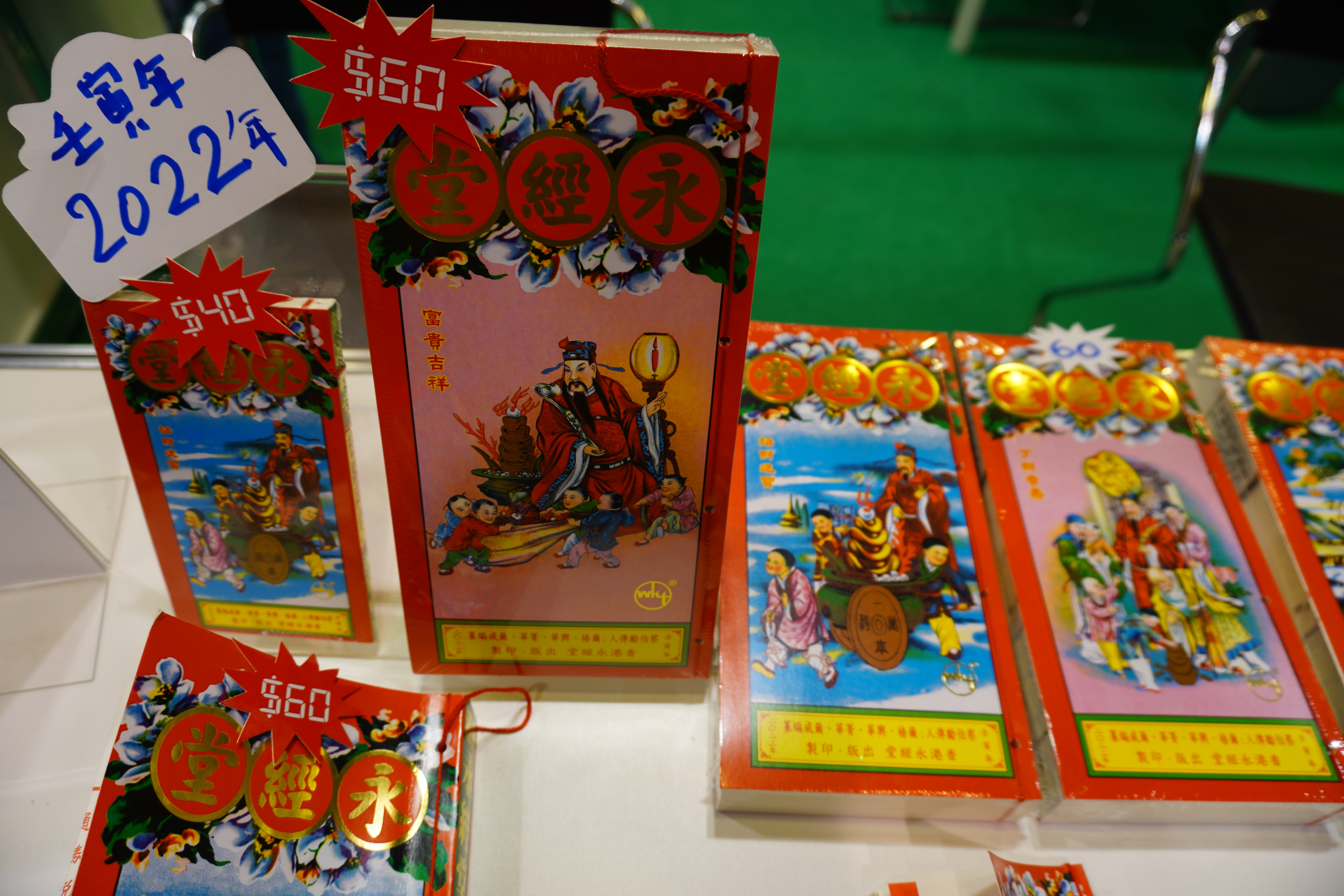
- Tung Shing, an almanac closely tied to the traditional Chinese calendar, is vital in many aspects of life, including marking suitable dates related to indigenous beliefs and guiding the selection of the most auspicious days for events like weddings.
- Chinese: Yang Metal Rat・Emptiness Mansion; Fire Horse Year, Month 10, Day 14 (Xiaoxue, 15 days until Daxue)
Other calendars
Akan	Kurukwasi
Armenian	5 Kʿaloch 1476
Aztec	Tlacaxipehualiztli 11, 5 Cuetzpalin
Babylonian	11 Arakhsamna, 2337 SE
Balinese pawukon	Menga, Pasah, Laba, Pon, Paniron, Redite of Kulantir, Brahma, Dangu, Suka
Bengali	7 Ogrohayon, BS 1433
Common Era	22 November 2026 CE
Coptic	13 Hathor, AM 1743
Egyptian	10 Pharmuthi, 2775 NE
Ethiopian	13 H̱edār, 2019 Amätä Məhrät
French Republican	Décade I, Primidi de Frimaire de l'Année 235 de la République
Gregorian	22 November, AD 2026
Hebrew	12 Kislev, AM 5787
Hindu	Aśvinī・Siddhi; Solar: 6 Mārgaśīrṣa, 1948 SE; Lunisolar: Trayodaśī, Śukla pakṣa of Kārtika, 2083 VE; Rāudra・5127 KY・1,872,901
Icelandic	Sunnudagur, 30 Gormánuður 2026
Islamic	11 Jumada al-thani, AH 1448 (using tabular method)
ISO week date	2026-W47-7
Japanese	14 Kannazuki, Reiwa 8 (Shōsetsu, 15 days until Taisetsu)
Julian	9 November, AD 2026 (AM 7535)
Julian day	2461367
Korean	14 Dwaejidal, 4359 DE
Maya	13.0.14.2.4; 17 Ceh, 5 Kan
Roman	ante diem V Idus Novembres, MMDCCLXXIX AUC
Solar Hijri	1 Azar, SH 1405
Tibetan	13 smin drug, me pho rta 2153 or 1772 or 1000

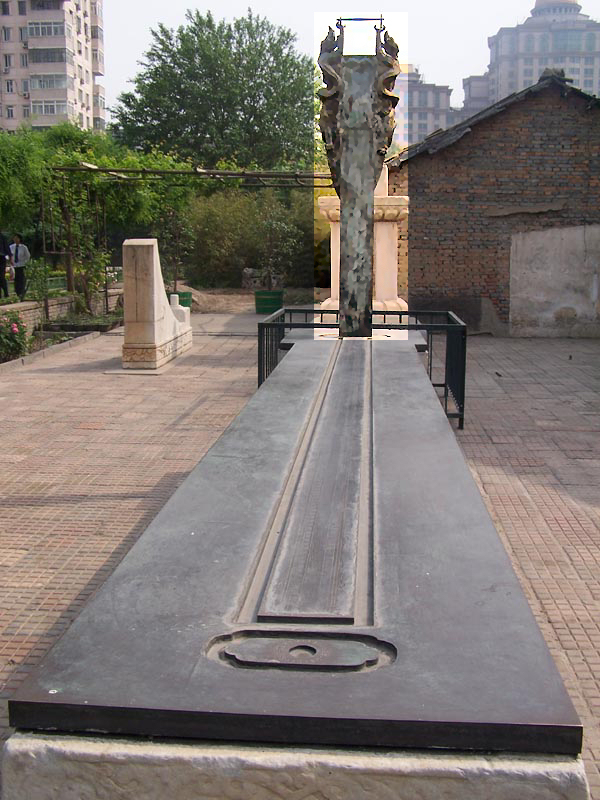
In ancient China, a vertical pole and a horizontal ruler, aligned north and south on the ground, were used to determine the winter solstice and the length of the tropical year by measuring the length of the shadow cast.

The Chinese calendar is a lunisolar calendar created by or commonly used by the Chinese people. A total of 102 calendars have been officially recorded in classical historical texts. In addition, many more calendars were created privately, with others being built by people who adapted Chinese cultural practices, such as the Koreans, Japanese, Vietnamese, and many others, over the course of a long history.

A Chinese calendar consists of twelve months, each aligned with the phases of the moon, along with an extra intercalary month inserted as needed to keep the calendar in sync with the seasons. It also features twenty-four solar terms, which track the position of the sun and are closely related to climate patterns. Among these, the winter solstice is the most significant reference point and must occur in the eleventh month of the year. Each month contains either twenty-nine or thirty days. The sexagenary cycle for each day runs continuously over thousands of years and serves as a determining factor to pinpoint a specific day amidst the many variations in the calendar. The variety of calendars arises from deviations in algorithms and assumptions about inputs. The Chinese calendar is location-sensitive, meaning that calculations based on different locations, such as Beijing and Nanjing, can yield different results.

While modern China primarily adopts the Gregorian calendar for official purposes, the traditional calendar remains culturally significant, influencing festivals and cultural practices, determining the timing of Chinese New Year with traditions like the twelve animals of the Chinese zodiac still widely observed. The winter solstice serves as another New Year, a tradition inherited from ancient China. Beyond China, it has shaped other East Asian calendars, including the Korean, Vietnamese, and Japanese lunisolar systems, each adapting the same lunisolar principles while integrating local customs and terminology.

== Etymology ==
Ancient form 秝 in oracle bone script

The name of calendar is in Chinese: 曆; pinyin: lì, and was represented in earlier character forms variants (歷, 厤), and ultimately derived from an ancient form (秝). The ancient form of the character consists of two stalks of rice plant (禾), arranged in parallel. This character represents the order in space and also the order in time. As its meaning became complex, the modern dedicated character (曆) was created to represent the meaning of calendar.

There are various Chinese terms for the calendar including:

- Nongli Calendar (traditional Chinese: 農曆; simplified Chinese: 农历; pinyin: nónglì; lit. 'agricultural calendar')
- Laoli Calendar (traditional Chinese: 老曆; simplified Chinese: 老历; pinyin: lǎolì; lit. 'old calendar')
- Zhongli Calendar (traditional Chinese: 中曆; simplified Chinese: 中历; pinyin: zhōnglì; Jyutping: zung1 lik6; lit. 'Chinese calendar')
- Huali Calendar (traditional Chinese: 華曆; simplified Chinese: 华历; pinyin: huálì; Jyutping: waa4 lik6; lit. 'Chinese calendar')
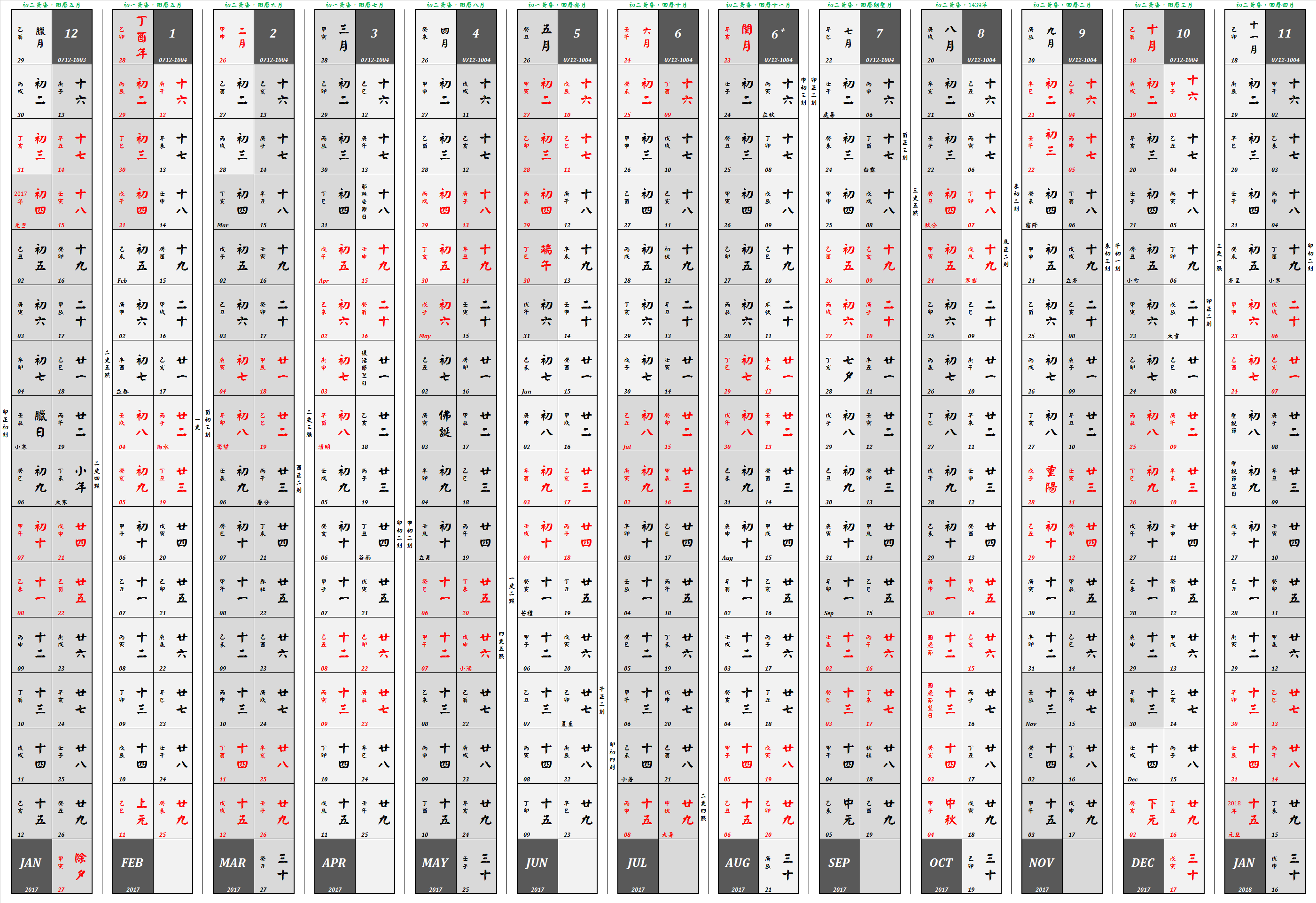
  2017 Chinese calendar

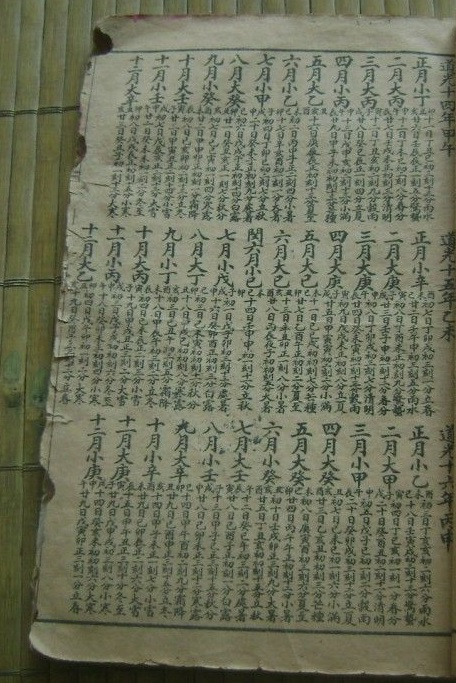
Page of a Chinese calendar containing monthly information in the years Daoguang 14–16, corresponding to 1834–1836

Various modern Chinese calendar names resulted from the struggle between the introduction of Gregorian calendar by government and the preservation of customs by the public in the era of Republic of China. The government wanted to abolish the Chinese calendar and use the Gregorian calendar, and even abolished the Chinese New Year, but faced great opposition. The public needed the astronomical Chinese calendar to do things at a proper time, for example farming and fishing; also, a wide spectrum of festivals and customs observations have been based on the calendar. The government finally compromised and rebranded it as the agricultural calendar in 1947, depreciating the calendar to merely agricultural use.

== Year-numbering systems ==
=== Eras ===
Ancient China numbered years from an emperor's ascension to the throne or his declaration of a new era name. The first recorded reign title was Jiànyuán (建元), from 140 BCE; the last reign title was Xuāntǒng (宣統; 宣统), from 1908 CE. The era system was abolished in 1912, after which the current or Republican era was used.

=== Epochs ===
An epoch is a point in time chosen as the origin of a particular calendar era, thus serving as a reference point from which subsequent time or dates are measured. The use of epochs in Chinese calendar system allow for a chronological starting point from whence to begin point continuously numbering subsequent dates. Various epochs have been used. Similarly, nomenclature similar to that of the Christian era has occasionally been used:

Era	Chinese name	Start	Year 1	2026 CE is year...
Yellow Emperor (Huángdì) year	黄帝紀年	Yellow Emperor (YE) began reigning	2697 BCE or 2698 BCE	4723 or 4724
Yáo year	唐堯紀年	Emperor Yao began reigning	2156 BCE	4182
Gònghé year	共和紀年	Gonghe Regency began	841 BCE	2867
Confucius year	孔子紀年	Confucius's birth year	551 BCE	2577
Unity year	統一紀年	Qin Shi Huang completes unification	221 BCE	2247

No reference date is universally accepted. The most popular is the Gregorian calendar (公曆; 公历; gōnglì; 'common calendar').

During the 17th century, the Jesuit missionaries tried to determine the epochal year of the Chinese calendar. In his Sinicae historiae decas prima (published in Munich in 1658), Martino Martini (1614–1661) dated the Yellow Emperor's ascension at 2697 BCE and began the Chinese calendar with the reign of Fuxi (which, according to Martini, began in 2952 BCE). Philippe Couplet's 1686 Chronological table of Chinese monarchs (Tabula chronologica monarchiae sinicae) gave the same date for the Yellow Emperor. The Jesuits' dates provoked interest in Europe, where they were used for comparison with Biblical chronology. Modern Chinese chronology has generally accepted Martini's dates, except that it usually places the reign of the Yellow Emperor at 2698 BCE and omits his predecessors Fuxi and Shennong as "too legendary to include".

Publications began using the estimated birth date of the Yellow Emperor as the first year of the Han calendar in 1903, with newspapers and magazines proposing different dates. Jiangsu province counted 1905 as the year 4396 (using a year 1 of 2491 BCE, and implying that 2026 CE is 4517), and the newspaper Ming Pao (明報) reckoned 1905 as 4603 (using a year 1 of 2698 BCE, and implying that 2026 CE is 4724). Liu Shipei (劉師培, 1884–1919) created the Yellow Emperor Calendar (黃帝紀元, 黃帝曆 or 軒轅紀年), with year 1 as the birth of the emperor (which he determined as 2711 BCE, implying that 2026 CE is 4737). There is no evidence that this calendar was used before the 20th century. Liu calculated that the 1900 international expedition sent by the Eight-Nation Alliance to suppress the Boxer Rebellion entered Beijing in the 4611th year of the Yellow Emperor.

On 2 January 1912, Sun Yat-sen announced changes to the official calendar and era. 1 January was Huángdì year 4609.11.13, assuming a year 1 of 2698 BCE, making 2026 CE year 4724. Many overseas Chinese communities like San Francisco's Chinatown adopted the change.

=== Age reckoning ===
In modern China, a person's official age is based on the Gregorian calendar. For traditional use, age is based on the Chinese Sui calendar. A child is considered one year old at birth. After each Chinese New Year, one year is added to their traditional age. Their age therefore is the number of Chinese calendar years in which they have lived. Due to the potential for confusion, the age of infants is often given in months instead of years.

After the Gregorian calendar was introduced in China, the Chinese traditional-age was referred to as the "nominal age" (虛歲; 虚岁; xūsuì; 'incomplete age') and the Gregorian age was known as the "real age" (實歲; 实岁; shísùi; 'whole age'). In Hong Kong, they are called 虛齡; hui ling and 實齡; sut ling respectively.

== History ==
=== Solar calendars ===
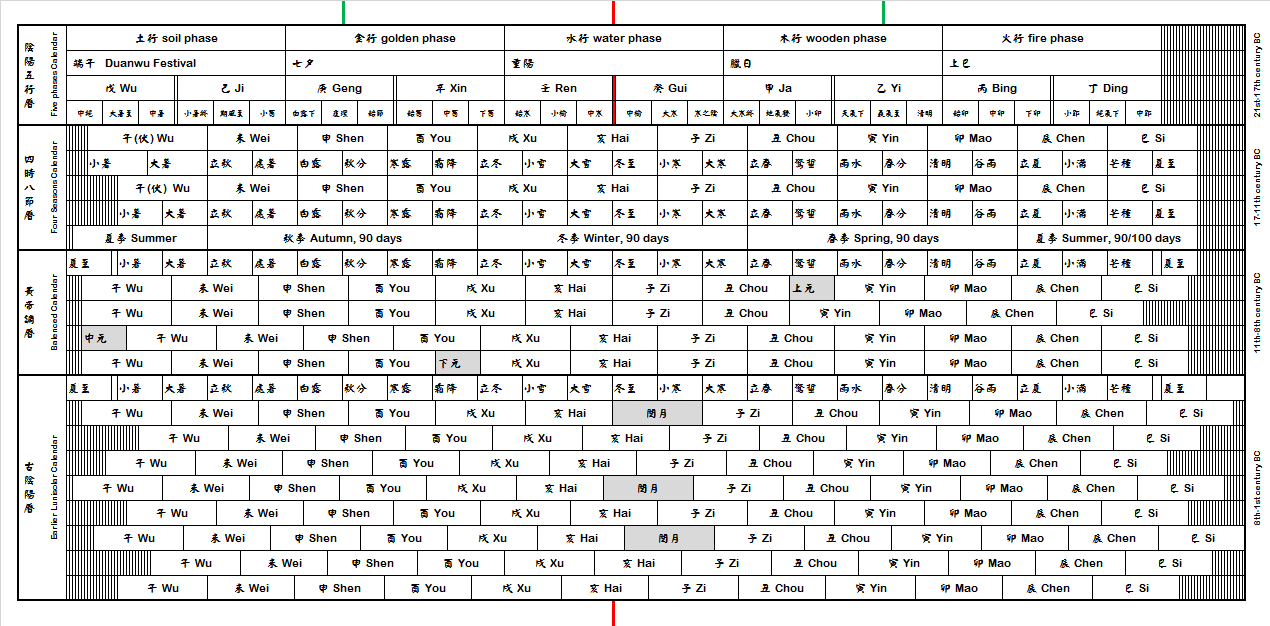
Five-phase and four-quarter calendars

The traditional Chinese lunisolar calendar was developed between 771 BCE and 476 BCE, during the Spring and Autumn period of the Eastern Zhou dynasty. Solar calendars were used before the Zhou dynasty period, along with the basic sexagenary system.

One version of the solar calendar is the five-elements (or phases) calendar (五行曆; 五行历; wǔxíng lì), which derives from the Wu Xing. A 365-day year was divided into five phases of 72 days, with each phase preceded by an intercalary day associated with the claimed beginning of the following 72 day period of domination by the next Wu Xing element; thus, the five phases each begin with a governing-element day (行御), followed by a 72-day period characterized by the ruling element. Years began on a jiǎzǐ (甲子) day and a 72-day wood phase, followed by a bǐngzǐ (丙子) day and a 72-day fire phase; a wùzǐ (戊子) day and a 72-day earth phase; a gēngzǐ (庚子) day and a 72-day metal phase, and a rénzǐ (壬子) day followed by a water phase. Each phase consisted of two three-week months, making each year ten months long. Other days were tracked using the Yellow River Map (He Tu).

Another version is a four-quarters calendar (四時八節曆; 四时八节历; sìshí bājié lì; 'four-season eight-solar-term calendar', or 四分曆; 四分历; sìfēn lì; 'quarters calendar'). The weeks were ten days long, with one month consisting of three weeks. A year had 12 months, with a ten-day week intercalated in summer as needed to keep up with the tropical year. The 10 Heavenly Stems and 12 Earthly Branches were used to mark days.

A third version is the balanced calendar (調曆; 调历; tiáo lì). A year was 365.25 days, and a month was 29.5 days. After every 16th month, a half-month was intercalated. According to oracle bone records, the Shang dynasty calendar (c. 1600 – c. 1046 BCE) was a balanced calendar with 12 to 14 months in a year; the month after the winter solstice was the first month (Zhēngyuè).

A solar calendar called the Tung Shing, the Yellow Calendar or Imperial Calendar (both alluding to Yellow Emperor) continued to see use as an almanac and agricultural guide throughout Chinese history.

=== Lunisolar calendars by dynasty ===
Lunisolar calendars involve correlations of the cycles of the sun (solar) and the moon (lunar).

==== Zhou dynasty ====
The first lunisolar calendar was the Zhou calendar (周曆; 周历), introduced under the Zhou dynasty (1046 BCE – 256 BCE). This calendar sets the beginning of the year at the day of the new moon before the winter solstice.

==== Competing Warring states calendars ====
Several competing lunisolar calendars were introduced as Zhou devolved into the Warring States, especially by states fighting Zhou control during the Warring States period (perhaps 475 BCE – 221 BCE). From the Warring States period (ending in 221 BCE), six especially significant calendar systems are known to have begun to be developed. Later on, during their future course in history, the modern names for the ancient six calendars were also developed: Huangdi, Yin, Zhou, Xia, Zhuanxu, and Lu.

Modern historical knowledge and records are limited for the earlier calendars. These calendars are known as the six ancient calendars (古六曆; 古六历), or quarter-remainder calendars, (四分曆; 四分历; sìfēnlì), since all calculate a year as 365 1/4 days long. Months begin on the day of the new moon, and a year has 12 or 13 months. Intercalary months (a 13th month) are added to the end of the year.

The state of Lu issued its own Lu calendar (魯曆; 鲁历).

The state of Jin issued the Xia calendar (夏曆; 夏历) with a year beginning on the day of the new moon nearest the March equinox.

The state of Qin issued the Zhuanxu calendar (顓頊曆; 颛顼历), with a year beginning on the day of the new moon nearest the winter solstice. The Qiang and Dai calendars are modern versions of the Zhuanxu calendar, used by highland peoples.

The Song state's Yin calendar (殷曆; 殷历) began its year on the day of the new moon after the winter solstice.

==== Qin and early Han dynasties ====
After Qin Shi Huang unified China under the Qin dynasty in 221 BCE, the Qin calendar (秦曆; 秦历) was introduced. It followed most of the rules governing the Zhuanxu calendar, but the month order was that of the Xia calendar; the year began with month 10 and ended with month 9, analogous to a Gregorian calendar beginning in October and ending in September. The intercalary month, known as the second Jiǔyuè (後九月; 后九月), was placed at the end of the year. The Qin calendar was used going into the Han dynasty.

==== Han dynasty Tàichū calendar ====
Emperor Wu of Han (r. 141 – 87 BCE) introduced reforms in the seventh of the eleven named eras of his reign, Tàichū (太初; 'Grand Beginning'), 104 BCE – 101 BCE. His Tàichū calendar (太初曆; 太初历; 'grand beginning calendar') defined a solar year as 365 385/1539 days (365;06:00:14.035), and the lunisolar month had 29 43/81 days (29;12:44:44.444). Since $\left(365+\frac{385}{1539}\right)\times19=\left(29+\frac{43}{81}\right)\times \left(19\times 12 + 7 \right)$, the 19-year cycle used for the 7 additional months was taken as exact, and not as an approximation.

This calendar introduced the 24 solar terms, dividing the year into 24 equal parts of 15° each. Solar terms were paired, with the 12 combined periods known as climate terms. The first solar term of the period was known as a pre-climate (節氣; 节气), and the second was a mid-climate (中氣; 中气). Months were named for the mid-climate to which they were closest, and a month without a mid-climate was an intercalary month.

The Taichu calendar established a framework for traditional calendars, with later calendars adding to the basic formula.

==== Northern and Southern Dynasties Dàmíng calendar ====
The Dàmíng calendar (大明曆; 大明历; 'brightest calendar'), created in the Northern and Southern Dynasties by Zu Chongzhi (429 CE – 500 CE), introduced the equinoxes.

==== Tang dynasty Wùyín Yuán calendar ====
The use of syzygy to determine the lunisolar month was first described in the Tang dynasty Wùyín Yuán calendar (戊寅元曆; 戊寅元历; 'earth tiger epoch calendar').

==== Yuan dynasty Shòushí calendar ====
The Yuan dynasty Shòushí calendar (授時曆; 授时历; 'season granting calendar') used spherical trigonometry to find the length of the tropical year. The calendar had a 365.2425-day year, identical to the Gregorian calendar.

==== Ming and Qing Shíxiàn calendar ====
From 1645 to 1913 the Shíxiàn or Chongzhen calendar was developed. During the late Ming dynasty, the Chinese Emperor appointed Xu Guangqi in 1629 to be the leader of the Shixian calendar reform. Assisted by Jesuits, he translated Western astronomical works and introduced new concepts, such as those of Nicolaus Copernicus, Johannes Kepler, Galileo Galilei, and Tycho Brahe; however, the new calendar was not released before the end of the dynasty.

In the early Qing dynasty, Johann Adam Schall von Bell submitted the calendar which was edited by the lead of Xu Guangqi to the Shunzhi Emperor. The Qing government issued it as the Shíxiàn (seasonal) calendar. In this calendar, the solar terms are 15° each along the ecliptic and it can be used as a solar calendar. However, the length of the climate term near the perihelion is less than 30 days and there may be two mid-climate terms. The Shíxiàn calendar changed the mid-climate-term rule to "decide the month in sequence, except the intercalary month."

The present "traditional calendar" follows the Shíxiàn calendar, except:

1. The baseline is Chinese Standard Time, rather than Beijing local time.
2. Modern astronomical data, rather than mathematical calculations, is used.

==== Modern Chinese calendar ====
Despite the Chinese calendar losing its place as the country's official calendar at the beginning of the 20th century, its use has continued.

The Republic of China Calendar published by the Beiyang government of the Republic of China still listed the dates of the Chinese calendar in addition to the Gregorian calendar.

In 1929, the Nationalist government tried to ban the traditional Chinese calendar. The Kuómín Calendar published by the government no longer listed the dates of the Chinese calendar. However, Chinese people were used to the traditional calendar, and many traditional customs were based on the Chinese calendar. The ban failed and was lifted in 1934.

The latest Chinese calendar was "New Edition of Wànniánlì, revised edition", edited by Beijing Purple Mountain Observatory, People's Republic of China.

In China, the modern calendar is defined by the Chinese national standard GB/T 33661–2017, "Calculation and Promulgation of the Chinese Calendar", issued by the Standardization Administration of China on 12 May 2017.

Although modern-day China uses the Gregorian calendar, the traditional Chinese calendar governs holidays, such as the Chinese New Year and Lantern Festival, in both China and overseas Chinese communities. It also provides the traditional Chinese nomenclature of dates within a year which people use to select auspicious days for weddings, funerals, moving or starting a business. The evening state-run news program Xinwen Lianbo in the People's Republic of China continues to announce the months and dates in both the Gregorian and the traditional lunisolar calendar.

To optimize the Chinese calendar, astronomers have proposed a number of changes. Kao Ping-tse (高平子; 1888–1970), a Chinese astronomer who co-founded the Purple Mountain Observatory, proposed that month numbers be calculated before the new moon and solar terms to be rounded to the day. Since the intercalary month is determined by the first month without a mid-climate and the mid-climate time varies by time zone, countries that adopted the calendar but calculate with their own time could vary from the time in China.

== Horology ==
Horology, or chronometry, refers to the measurement of time. In the context of the Chinese calendar, horology involves the definition and mathematical measurement of terms or elements such observable astronomic movements or events such as are associated with days, months, years, hours, and so on. These measurements are based upon objective, observable phenomena. Calendar accuracy is based upon accuracy and precision of measurements.

The Chinese calendar is lunisolar, similar to the Hindu, Hebrew and ancient Babylonian calendars. In this case the calendar is in part based in objective, observable phenomena and in part by mathematical analysis to correlate the observed phenomena. Lunisolar calendars especially attempt to correlate the solar and lunar cycles, but other considerations can be agricultural and seasonal or phenological, or religious, or even political.

Basic horological definitions include that days begin and end at midnight, and months begin on the day of the new moon. Years start on the second (or third) new moon after the winter solstice. Solar terms govern the beginning, middle, and end of each month. A sexagenary cycle, comprising concurrently running cycles of the Ten Heavenly Stems (干; gān) and the Twelve Earthly Branches (支; zhī), is used as identification alongside each year, month, day, and hour, including intercalary months or leap months. Months are also annotated as either long (大; 'big' for months with 30 days) or short (小; 'small' for months with 29 days). There are also other elements of the traditional Chinese calendar.

=== Celestial phenomena used in the calendar ===
The Chinese calendar involved observation and calculation of the apparent movements of the Sun, Moon, planets, and stars, as observed from Earth.

Many Chinese astronomers have contributed to the development of the Chinese calendar. Many were of the scholarly or shi class (Chinese: 士; pinyin: shì), including writers of history, such as Sima Qian.

Notable Chinese astronomers who have contributed to the development of the calendar include Gan De, Shi Shen, and Zu Chongzhi

Early technological developments aiding in calendar development include the development of the gnomon. Later technological developments useful to the calendar system include naming, numbering and mapping of the sky, the development of analog computational devices such as the armillary sphere and the water clock, and the establishment of observatories.

The movements of the Sun, Moon, Mercury, Venus, Mars, Jupiter and Saturn (sometimes known as the seven luminaries) are the references for calendar calculations.

- The distance between Mercury (known in Chinese as the "water star" 水星) and the sun is less than 30° (the sun's height at chénshí:辰時, 8:00 to 10:00 am), so Mercury was sometimes called the "chen star" (辰星).
- Venus appears at dawn and dusk and is known as the "bright star" (啟明星; 启明星) or "long star" (長庚星; 长庚星).
- Mars looks like fire and occurs irregularly, and is known as the "fire star" (熒惑星; 荧惑星 or 火星), serving as a punitive figure in Chinese mythology. When Mars is near Antares (心宿二), it was regarded as a bad omen forecasting an emperor's death or a chancellor's removal (荧惑守心).
- Jupiter's revolution period is 11.86 years, so Jupiter is called the "age star" (歲星; 岁星); 30° of Jupiter's revolution is about a year on earth.
- Saturn's revolution period is about 28 years. Known as the "guard star" (鎮星), Saturn passes one of the 28 Mansions every year.

The Big Dipper is used as the celestial compass, and its handle's direction indicates the season and month. The stars are divided into Three Enclosures and 28 Mansions according to their location in the sky relative to Ursa Minor, at the center. Each mansion is named with a character describing the shape of its principal asterism. The Three Enclosures are Purple Forbidden, (紫微), Supreme Palace (太微), and Heavenly Market (天市). The eastern mansions are 角, 亢, 氐, 房, 心, 尾, 箕. Southern mansions are 井, 鬼, 柳, 星, 張, 翼, 軫. Western mansions are 奎, 婁, 胃, 昴, 畢, 參, 觜. Northern mansions are 斗, 牛, 女, 虛, 危, 室, 壁. The moon moves through about one lunar mansion per day, so the 28 mansions were also used to count days. For example, in the Tang dynasty, Yuan Tiangang (袁天罡) noted the 28 mansions, seven luminaries and yearly Earthly Branches to yield combination dates such as "horn-wood-flood dragon" (角木蛟).

The names and determinative stars of the mansions are:

Four Symbols (四象)	Mansion (宿)			
Four Symbols (四象)	Number	Name (Pinyin)	Translation	Determinative star
Azure Dragon of the East (東方青龍; Dōngfāng Qīnglóng); Spring	1	角; Jiǎo	Horn	α Vir
Azure Dragon of the East (東方青龍; Dōngfāng Qīnglóng); Spring	2	亢; Kàng	Neck	κ Vir
Azure Dragon of the East (東方青龍; Dōngfāng Qīnglóng); Spring	3	氐; Dī	Root	α Lib
Azure Dragon of the East (東方青龍; Dōngfāng Qīnglóng); Spring	4	房; Fáng	Room	π Sco
Azure Dragon of the East (東方青龍; Dōngfāng Qīnglóng); Spring	5	心; Xīn	Heart	α Sco
Azure Dragon of the East (東方青龍; Dōngfāng Qīnglóng); Spring	6	尾; Wěi	Tail	μ¹ Sco
Azure Dragon of the East (東方青龍; Dōngfāng Qīnglóng); Spring	7	箕; Jī	Winnowing Basket	γ Sgr
Black Tortoise of the North (北方玄武; Běifāng Xuánwǔ); Winter	8	斗; Dǒu	(Southern) Dipper	φ Sgr
Black Tortoise of the North (北方玄武; Běifāng Xuánwǔ); Winter	9	牛; Niú	Ox	β Cap
Black Tortoise of the North (北方玄武; Běifāng Xuánwǔ); Winter	10	女; Nǚ	Girl	ε Aqr
Black Tortoise of the North (北方玄武; Běifāng Xuánwǔ); Winter	11	虛; Xū	Emptiness	β Aqr
Black Tortoise of the North (北方玄武; Běifāng Xuánwǔ); Winter	12	危; Wēi	Rooftop	α Aqr
Black Tortoise of the North (北方玄武; Běifāng Xuánwǔ); Winter	13	室; Shì	Encampment	α Peg
Black Tortoise of the North (北方玄武; Běifāng Xuánwǔ); Winter	14	壁; Bì	Wall	γ Peg
White Tiger of the West (西方白虎; Xīfāng Báihǔ); Fall	15	奎; Kuí	Legs	η And
White Tiger of the West (西方白虎; Xīfāng Báihǔ); Fall	16	婁; Lóu	Bond	β Ari
White Tiger of the West (西方白虎; Xīfāng Báihǔ); Fall	17	胃; Wèi	Stomach	35 Ari
White Tiger of the West (西方白虎; Xīfāng Báihǔ); Fall	18	昴; Mǎo	Hairy Head	17 Tau
White Tiger of the West (西方白虎; Xīfāng Báihǔ); Fall	19	畢; Bì	Net	ε Tau
White Tiger of the West (西方白虎; Xīfāng Báihǔ); Fall	20	觜; Zī	Turtle Beak	λ Ori
White Tiger of the West (西方白虎; Xīfāng Báihǔ); Fall	21	参; Shēn	Three Stars	ζ Ori
Vermilion Bird of the South (南方朱雀; Nánfāng Zhūquè); Summer	22	井; Jǐng	Well	μ Gem
Vermilion Bird of the South (南方朱雀; Nánfāng Zhūquè); Summer	23	鬼; Guǐ	Ghost	θ Cnc
Vermilion Bird of the South (南方朱雀; Nánfāng Zhūquè); Summer	24	柳; Liǔ	Willow	δ Hya
Vermilion Bird of the South (南方朱雀; Nánfāng Zhūquè); Summer	25	星; Xīng	Star	α Hya
Vermilion Bird of the South (南方朱雀; Nánfāng Zhūquè); Summer	26	張; Zhāng	Extended Net	υ¹ Hya
Vermilion Bird of the South (南方朱雀; Nánfāng Zhūquè); Summer	27	翼; Yì	Wings	α Crt
Vermilion Bird of the South (南方朱雀; Nánfāng Zhūquè); Summer	28	軫; Zhěn	Chariot	γ Crv

=== Units ===
==== Sexagenary numbering system ====
To avoid ambiguity, the Chinese calendar uses two concurrently-running cycles to name hours, days, months and years. The Ten Heavenly Stems is a decimal system, and the Twelve Earthly Branches is a duodecimal system. The Twelve Earthly Branches mark dual hours (時; 时; shí or 時辰; 时辰; shíchen) and climatic terms. Together, the stem-branches becomes a sexagesimal system of 60 stem-branches. The cycle of the five elements of Chinese philosophy are also matched to each stem, branch, or stem-branch.

Heavenly Stem	Meaning	
Heavenly Stem	Original meaning	Modern
甲	turtle shell	first (book I, person A etc.), methyl group, helmet, armor, words related to beetles, crustaceans, fingernails, toenails
乙	fishguts	second (book II, person B etc.), ethyl group, twist
丙	fishtail (Note: Wenlin Dictionary: Picture of a fish tail.)	third, bright, fire, fishtail (rare)
丁	nail	fourth, male adult, robust, T-shaped, to strike, a surname
戊	halberd	(not used)
己	threads on a loom (Note: Wenlin Dictionary: 己 may have depicted thread on a loom; an ancient meaning was 'unravel threads', which was later written 紀 jì. 己 was borrowed both for the word jǐ 'self', and for the name of the sixth Heavenly Stem (天干).)	self
庚	evening star	age (of person)
辛	to offend superiors	bitter, piquant, toilsome
壬	burden (Note: Wenlin Dictionary: 壬 rén depicts "a 丨 carrying pole supported 一 in the middle part and having one object attached at each end, as always done in China" —Karlgren (1923). (See 扁担 biǎndan). Now the character 任 rèn has the meaning of carrying a burden, and the original character 壬 is used only for the ninth of the ten heavenly stems (天干).)	to shoulder, to trust with office
癸	grass for libation (Note: Wenlin Dictionary: 癶 "stretch out the legs" + 天; The nicely disposed grass, on which the Ancients poured the libations offered to the Manes)	(not used)

	Earthly Branch	Chinese			Direction	Season	Lunisolar Month	Double Hour
	Earthly Branch	Mandarin Zhuyin	Mandarin Pinyin	Character	Direction	Season	Lunisolar Month	Double Hour
1	子	ㄗˇ	zǐ	鼠 Rat	0° (north)	winter	Month 11	23 to 1 (midnight)
2	丑	ㄔㄡˇ	chǒu	牛 Cow	30°	winter	Month 12	1 to 3
3	寅	ㄧㄣˊ	yín	虎 Tiger	60°	spring	Month 1	3 to 5
4	卯	ㄇㄠˇ	mǎo	兔 Rabbit	90° (east)	spring	Month 2	5 to 7
5	辰	ㄔㄣˊ	chén	龍 Dragon	120°	spring	Month 3	7 to 9
6	巳	ㄙˋ	sì	蛇 Snake	150°	summer	Month 4	9 to 11
7	午	ㄨˇ	wǔ	馬 Horse	180° (south)	summer	Month 5	11 to 13 (noon)
8	未	ㄨㄟˋ	wèi	羊 Sheep	210°	summer	Month 6	13 to 15
9	申	ㄕㄣ	shēn	猴 Monkey	240°	autumn	Month 7	15 to 17
10	酉	ㄧㄡˇ	yǒu	雞 Chicken	270° (west)	autumn	Month 8	17 to 19
11	戌	ㄒㄩ	xū	犬 Dog	300°	autumn	Month 9	19 to 21
12	亥	ㄏㄞˋ	hài	猪 Wild boar	330°	winter	Month 10	21 to 23

For example, the year from 12 February 2021 to 31 January 2022 was a Xīnchǒu year (辛丑年) of 12 months or 354 days. The 60 stem-branches have been used to mark the year since the Shang dynasty (1600 BCE – 1046 BCE). Astrologers knew that the orbital period of Jupiter is about 12×361 = 4332 days, which they divided into 12 years (歲; 岁; suì) of 361 days each. The stem-branches system solved the era system's problem of unequal reign lengths.

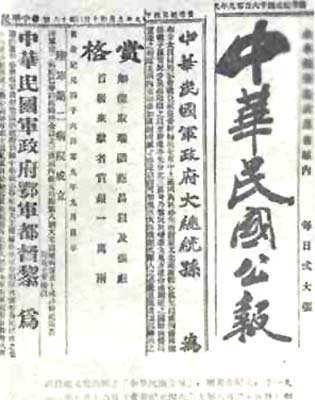
Hubei military government founded ROC Gazette (中華民國公報), dated YE 4609-10-15 (黃帝紀元4609年10月15日, yyyy-mm-dd)

Current naming conventions use numbers as the month names, although each month is also associated with one of the twelve Earthly Branches. The Tang dynasty used the Earthly Branches to mark the months from December 761 to May 762. Over this period, the year began with the winter solstice. Many years have intercalary months.

Historically, Chinese had days of the month numbered with the 60 stem-branches:

天聖元年…二月…丁巳，奉安太祖、太宗御容于南京鴻慶宮.
Tiānshèng 1st year…Èryuè…Dīngsì, the emperor's funeral was at his temple, and the imperial portrait was installed in Nanjing's Hongqing Palace.

— History of Song Dynasty, "卷009" [Volume 9]. 宋史 [History of Song Dynasty] (in Chinese) – via Wikisource.

Fortune-tellers identify the heavenly stem and earthly branch corresponding to a particular day of the month, to its month, and to its year, to determine the Four Pillars of Destiny associated with the date. They consult publications such as the Tung Shing (also referred to as the Chinese Almanac or Yellow Calendar), containing the essential information concerning Chinese astrology. Since days rotate through a sexagenary cycle marked by coordination between heavenly stems and earthly branches, the Four Pillars of Destiny are also known as "Birth Time Eight Characters" (八字) with each of the four pillars consisting of one character for its corresponding heavenly stem, and one character for its earthly branch. Since Tung Shing days (also known as "True Animals" in reference to the Chinese zodiac) are sexagenaric, their order is independent of their numeric order in each month or within a week.

==== Day ====
Days are Sun oriented, based upon divisions of the solar year. A day (日; rì) is considered both traditionally and currently to be the time from one midnight to the next. Traditionally, days (including the night-time portion) were divided into 12 double-hours, and in modern times, the 24-hour system has become more standard.

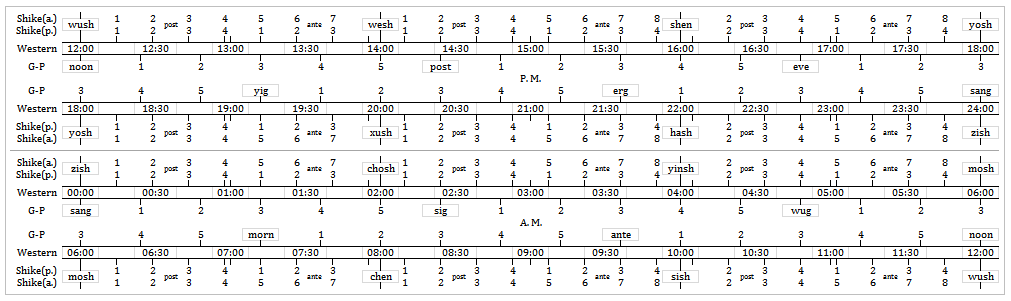
Explanatory chart for traditional Chinese time

China has used the Western hour-minute-second system to divide the day since the Qing dynasty. Several systems were in use historically; systems using multiples of twelve and ten were popular, since they could be easily counted and aligned with the Heavenly Stems and Earthly Branches.

==== Week ====
As early as the Bronze Age Xia dynasty, days were grouped into nine- or ten-day weeks known as xún (旬). Months consisted of three xún. The first 10 days were the early xún (上旬), the middle 10 the mid xún (中旬), and the last nine (or 10) days were the late xún (下旬). Japan adopted this pattern, with 10-day-weeks known as jun (旬). In Korea, they were known as sun (순,旬).

The structure of xún led to public holidays every five or ten days. Officials of the Han dynasty were legally required to rest every five days (twice a xún, or 5–6 times a month). The name of these breaks became huàn (澣; 浣; 'wash'). The official rest days were organized according to 5-day (Han to Sui dynasties) or 10-day (Sui to Yuan dynasties) cycles, or seasonal long breaks (Ming and Qing dynasties).

Grouping days into sets of ten is still used today in referring to specific natural events. "Three Fu" (三伏), a 29–30-day period which is the hottest of the year, reflects its three-xún length. After the winter solstice, nine sets of nine days were counted to calculate the end of winter.

===== Seven-day week and 28-day cycle =====
The seven-day week was adopted from the Hellenistic system by the 4th century CE, although its method of transmission into China is unclear. It was again transmitted to China in the 8th century by Manichaeans via Kangju, a Sogdian-speaking Central Asian kingdom near Samarkand. (Note: The 4th-century date, according to the Cihai encyclopedia, is due to a reference to Fan Ning during the Jin dynasty) (Note: The renewed adoption from Manichaeans by the 8th century (Tang dynasty) is documented by the writings of the Chinese Buddhist monk Yi Jing and the Ceylonese Buddhist monk Bu Kong.) The names of the days of the week were derived from the five classical planets along with the Sun and Moon, making a total of seven celestial bodies highly visible in the sky (七曜). At that time, people created simple handwritten almanacs, where Sunday was marked with the character 密. The seven-day week then disappeared for a long time, only to be revived when Christianity gained a foothold in China and later made mandatory by the Republican government. Following the calendrical reforms in China during the era of the Republic of China, the seven-day week system became the most widely used, aligning with the Western world.

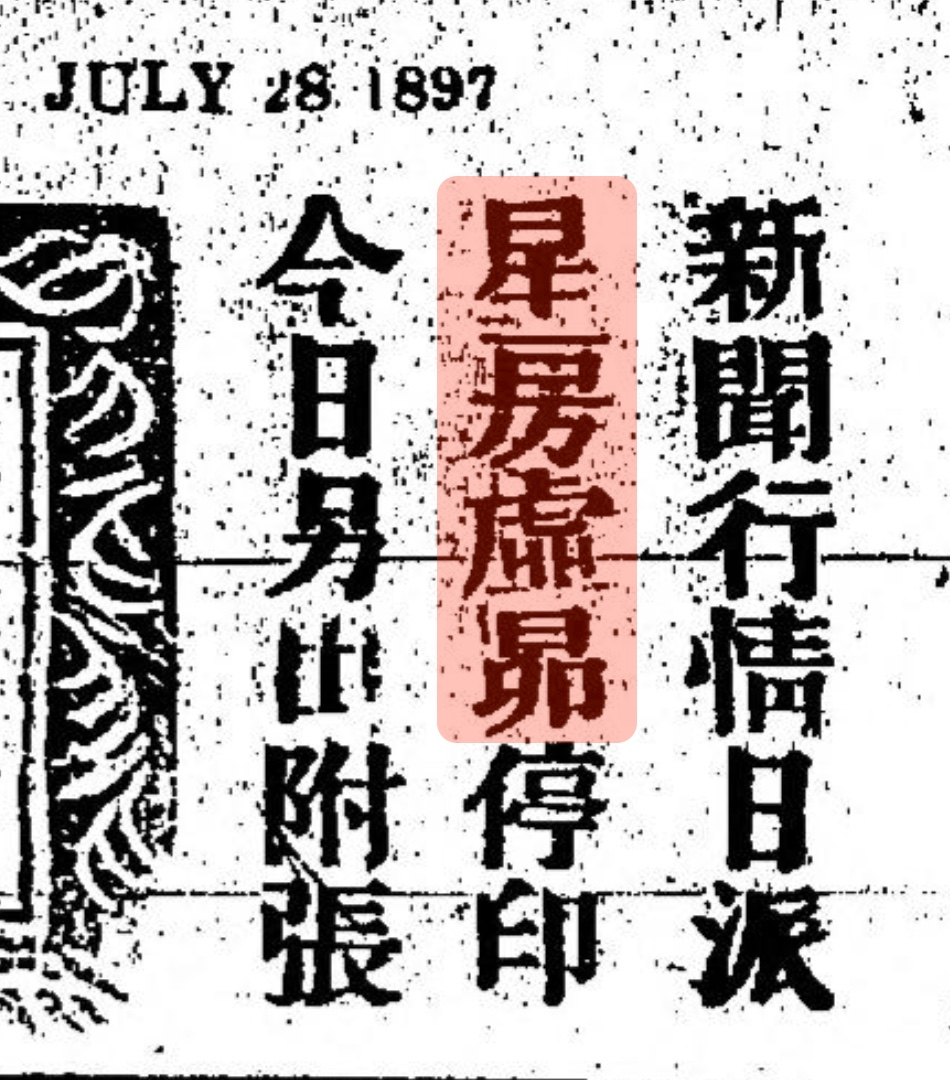
"星房虛昴" denoted Sunday

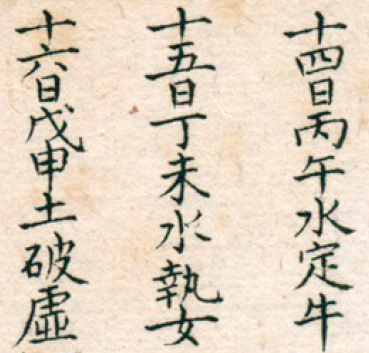
"牛", "女" and "虛" of 28-day cycle in an almanac, falling on Friday, Saturday and Sunday, respectively. (Line read from right to left)

Prior to the Republican period, a 28-day cycle system was also used, borrowing from the Twenty-Eight Mansions system. Originally, these mansions tracked the moon's position against the stars in the sky, much like the sun and zodiac, and became part of the Chinese constellations. However, the 28-day cycle was later used purely for fortune-telling and no longer represented astronomical phenomena. This information was documented and is still referenced in the Tung Shing, a Chinese almanac. When Westerners introduced the seven-day week system to China, both the Chinese and the Westerners found the 28-day cycle useful as they matched the seven-day cycle. Sunday, for instance, was written as "星房虛昴," indicating the corresponding four days on the 28-day cycle, as easily found in the almanac.

Seven-day week comparison
Chinese	日	月	火星	水星	木星	金星	土星
Literal meaning	sun	moon	fire star	water star	wood star	golden star	earth star
English meaning	Sun	Moon	Mars	Mercury	Jupiter	Venus	Saturn
七曜, the seven luminaries	日曜日	月曜日	火曜日	水曜日	木曜日	金曜日	土曜日
literal meaning	Sun-day	Moon-day	Mars-day	Mercury-day	Jupiter-day	Venus-day	Saturn-day
Sogdian names	Mīr	Māq	Wnqān	Tīr	Wrnzt	Nāqit	Kēwān
Chinese phonic translation	密/蜜	莫	雲漢	咥/嘀	溫沒司/嗢沒司/鶻勿斯	那頡/那歇/般頡	雞緩/枳浣
Modern English	Sunday	Monday	Tuesday	Wednesday	Thursday	Friday	Saturday
Modern Chinese	星期日	星期一	星期二	星期三	星期四	星期五	星期六
Hong Kong variant	禮拜日	禮拜一	禮拜二	禮拜三	禮拜四	禮拜五	禮拜六
28-day cycle, borrowing from Twenty-Eight Mansions	星	張	翼	軫	角	亢	氐
28-day cycle, borrowing from Twenty-Eight Mansions	房	心	尾	箕	斗	牛	女
28-day cycle, borrowing from Twenty-Eight Mansions	虛	危	室	壁	奎	婁	胃
28-day cycle, borrowing from Twenty-Eight Mansions	昴	畢	觜	參	井	鬼	柳

==== Month ====
Months are Moon oriented. Month (月; yuè), the time from one new moon to the next. These synodic months are about 29 17/32 days long. This includes the Date (日期; rìqī), when a day occurs in the month. Days are numbered in sequence from 1 to 29 (or 30). And, a Calendar month (日曆月; rìlì yuè), is when a month occurs within a year. Some months may be repeated.

Months are defined by the time between new moons, which averages approximately 29 17/32 days. There is no specified length of any particular Chinese month, so the first month could have 29 days (short month, 小月) in some years and 30 days (long month, 大月) in other years.

Because astronomical observation determines month length, dates on the calendar correspond to moon phases. The first day of each month is the new moon. On the seventh or eighth day of each month, the first-quarter moon is visible in the afternoon and early evening. On the 15th or 16th day of each month, the full moon is visible all night. On the 22nd or 23rd day of each month, the last-quarter moon is visible late at night and in the morning.

Different eras used different systems to determine the length of each month. The synodic month of the Taichu calendar was 29 43/81 days long. The 7th-century, Tang-dynasty Wùyín Yuán Calendar was the first to determine month length by synodic month instead of the cycling method. Since then, month lengths have primarily been determined by observation and prediction.

The days of the month are always written with two characters and numbered beginning with 1. Days one to 10 are written with the day's numeral, preceded by the character Chū (初); Chūyī (初一) is the first day of the month, and Chūshí (初十) the 10th. Days 11 to 20 are written as regular Chinese numerals; Shíwǔ (十五) is the 15th day of the month, and Èrshí (二十) the 20th. Days 21 to 29 are written with the character Niàn (廿) before the characters one through nine; Niànsān (廿三), for example, is the 23rd day of the month. Day 30 (when applicable) is written as the numeral Sānshí (三十).

==== Year ====
A year (年; nián) is based upon the time of one revolution of Earth around the Sun, rounded to whole days. Traditionally, the year is measured from the first day of spring (lunisolar year) or the winter solstice (solar year).

A 12-month-year using this system has 354 days, which would drift significantly from the tropical year. To fix this, traditional Chinese years have a 13-month year approximately once every three years. The 13-month version has the same long and short months alternating, but adds a 30-day leap month (閏月; rùnyuè). Years with 12 months are called common years, and 13-month years are known as long years.

A solar year is astronomically about 365 31/128 days. A lunisolar calendar year is either 353–355 or 383–385 days long. The lunisolar calendar (日曆; rìlì) year usually begins on the new moon closest to Lichun, the first day of spring. This is typically the second and sometimes third new moon after the winter solstice.

The lunisolar year begins with the first spring month, Zhēngyuè (正月; 'capital month'), and ends with the last winter month, Làyuè (臘月; 腊月; 'sacrificial month'). All other months are named for their number in the month order. See below on the timing of the Chinese New Year.

===== Solar year and solar terms =====
The solar year (traditional Chinese: 歲; simplified Chinese: 岁; pinyin: Suì), the time between winter solstices of 365 or 366 days, is divided into 24 periods. Each of these solar terms corresponds to a 15°-portion of the ecliptic. The 24 moments of transition, known as jié qì (節氣), solar nodes, mark off the seasons (both Western and Chinese), corresponding to equinoxes, solstices, and other Chinese events.

The solar terms are paired: one corresponding to the sun being a multiple of 30° from a solstice, called "major" terms, or Zhōngqì hence marked Z, and the other corresponding to the sun being 15° further west (earlier in the year), called "minor" terms. The word jié qì can also be used to refer just to these (hence J).

The solar terms qīng míng (清明) around 5 April and dōng zhì (冬至) around 22 December are celebrated events in China.

The solar year (suì, 歲; 岁) begins on the December solstice and proceeds through the 24 solar terms. Since the speed of the Sun's apparent motion in the elliptical is variable, the time between major terms is not fixed. This variation in time between major terms results in different solar year lengths.

A solar year generally spans over 11 or 12 complete lunar months, plus two incomplete lunar months around the winter solstice. The complete months are numbered from 0 to 10, and the month split between two solar years is considered the 11th month. If there are 12 complete months within a solar year, it is known as a leap year (a year possessing an intercalary month). This intercalation makes the calendar lunisolar.

Different versions of the arithmetic solar calendar have different mean year lengths. For example, one solar year of the 1st century BCE Tàichū calendar averages at 365 385/1539 (365.25016) days. The mean solar year of the 13th-century Shòushí calendar is 365 97/400 (365.2425) days, identical to the Gregorian calendar. The additional 0.00766 day from the Tàichū calendar lead to a one-day shift every 130.5 years.

24 solar terms
Number	Pinyin name	Chinese name	Translation	Approximate date	Corresponding astrological sign
J1	Lì chūn	立春	Beginning of spring	4 February	♒️ Aquarius
Z1	Yǔ shuǐ	雨水	Rain water	19 February	♓️ Pisces
J2	Jīng zhé	驚蟄；惊蛰	Waking of insects	6 March	♓️ Pisces
Z2	Chūn fēn	春分	Spring divide	21 March	♈️ Aries
J3	Qīng míng	清明	Pure brightness	5 April	♈️ Aries
Z3	Gǔ yǔ	穀雨；谷雨	Grain rain	20 April	♉️ Taurus
J4	Lì xià	立夏	Beginning of summer	6 May	♉️ Taurus
Z4	Xiǎo mǎn	小滿；小满	Grain full	21 May	♊️ Gemini
J5	Máng zhòng	芒種；芒种	Grain in ear	6 June	♊️ Gemini
Z5	Xià zhì	夏至	Summer extremity	21 June	♋️ Cancer
J6	Xiǎo shǔ	小暑	Slight heat	7 July	♋️ Cancer
Z6	Dà shǔ	大暑	Great heat	23 July	♌️ Leo
J7	Lì qiū	立秋	Beginning of autumn	8 August	♌️ Leo
Z7	Chǔ shǔ	處暑；处暑	Limit of heat	23 August	♍️ Virgo
J8	Bái lù	白露	White dew	8 September	♍️ Virgo
Z8	Qiū fēn	秋分	Autumn divide	23 September	♎️ Libra
J9	Hán lù	寒露	Cold dew	8 October	♎️ Libra
Z9	Shuāng jiàng	霜降	Descent of frost	23 October	♏️ Scorpio
J10	Lì dōng	立冬	Beginning of winter	7 November	♏️ Scorpio
Z10	Xiǎo xuě	小雪	Slight snow	22 November	♐️ Sagittarius
J11	Dà xuě	大雪	Great snow	7 December	♐️ Sagittarius
Z11	Dōng zhì	冬至	Winter extremity	22 December	♑️ Capricorn
J12	Xiǎo hán	小寒	Slight cold	6 January	♑️ Capricorn
Z12	Dà hán	大寒	Great cold	20 January	♒️ Aquarius

If there are 12 complete lunisolar months within a solar year, the first lunisolar month that does not contain a major term is designated the leap, or intercalary, month. (Quite rarely there is a year having a month that contains no major term but which is not counted as a leap month because there is another month later which contains two. This will happen in 2033.) Leap months are numbered with rùn 閏, the character for "intercalary", plus the name of the month they follow. In 2017, the intercalary month after month six was called Rùn Liùyuè, or "intercalary sixth month" (閏六月) and written as 6i or 6+. The next intercalary month (in 2020, after month four) is called Rùn Sìyuè (閏四月) and written 4i or 4+.

Leap months occur on average once in 2 5/7 years, or 33 4/7 months (because of the Metonic cycle of 19 years equaling 235 months), but this varies because the speed of the moon, and of the sun, varies.

== Phenology and holidays ==
Early calendar systems, including the Chinese calendar, often were closely tied to natural phenomena. Phenology is the study of periodic events in biological life cycles and how these are influenced by seasonal and interannual variations in climate, as well as habitat factors (such as elevation). The plum-rains season (梅雨), the rainy season in late spring and early summer, begins on the first bǐng day after Mangzhong (芒種) and ends on the first wèi day after Xiaoshu (小暑). The Three Fu (三伏; sānfú) are three periods of hot weather, counted from the first gēng day after the summer solstice. The first fu (初伏; chūfú) is 10 days long. The mid-fu (中伏; zhōngfú) is 10 or 20 days long. The last fu (末伏; mòfú) is 10 days from the first gēng day after the beginning of autumn. The Shujiu cold days (數九; shǔjǐu; 'counting to nine') are the 81 days after the winter solstice (divided into nine sets of nine days), and are considered the coldest days of the year. Each nine-day unit is known by its order in the set, followed by "nine" (九). In traditional Chinese culture, "nine" represents the infinity, which is also the number of "Yang". According to one belief nine times accumulation of "Yang" gradually reduces the "Yin", and finally the weather becomes warm.

=== Names of months ===
Lunisolar months were originally named according to natural phenomena. Current naming conventions use numbers as the month names. Every month is also associated with one of the twelve Earthly Branches.

Month number	Starts on Gregorian date	Phenological name	Earthly Branch name	Modern name
1	between 20 January – 19 February *	陬月; zōuyuè; 'corner month'. square of Pegasus month	寅月; yínyuè; 'tiger month'	正月; zhēngyuè; 'first month'
2	between 19 February – 21 March *	杏月; xìngyuè; 'apricot month'	卯月; mǎoyuè; 'rabbit month'	二月; èryuè; 'second month'
3	between 21 March – 20 April *	桃月; táoyuè; 'peach month'	辰月; chényuè; 'dragon month'	三月; sānyuè; 'third month'
4	between 20 April – 21 May *	梅月; méiyuè; 'plum month'	巳月; sìyuè; 'snake month'	四月; sìyuè; 'fourth month'
5	between 21 May – 21 June *	榴月; liúyuè; 'pomegranate month'	午月; wǔyuè; 'horse month'	五月; wǔyuè; 'fifth month'
6	between 21 June – 23 July *	荷月; héyuè; 'lotus month'	未月; wèiyuè; 'goat month'	六月; liùyuè; 'sixth month'
7	between 23 July – 23 August *	蘭月; 兰月; lányuè; 'orchid month'	申月; shēnyuè; 'monkey month'	七月; qīyuè; 'seventh month'
8	between 23 August – 23 September *	桂月; guìyuè; 'osmanthus month'	酉月; yǒuyuè; 'rooster month'	八月; bāyuè; 'eighth month'
9	between 23 September – 23 October *	菊月; júyuè; 'chrysanthemum month'	戌月; xūyuè; 'dog month'	九月; jiǔyuè; 'ninth month'
10	between 23 October – 22 November *	露月; lùyuè; 'dew month'	亥月; hàiyuè; 'pig month'	十月; shíyuè; 'tenth month'
11	between 22 November – 22 December *	冬月; dōngyuè; 'winter month'; 葭月; jiāyuè; 'reed month'	子月; zǐyuè; 'rat month'	十一月; 'eleventh month' or 冬月; dōngyuè; 'winter month'
12	between 22 December – 20 January *	冰月; bīngyuè; 'ice month'	丑月; chǒuyuè; 'ox month'	十二月; 'twelfth month' or 臘月; 腊月; làyuè; 'end-of-year month'

*Gregorian dates are approximate and should be used with caution. Many years have intercalary months.

Gregorian names for months cannot be used for name-equivalent months in the Chinese calendar; e.g. Dragon Boat Festival, which falls on the fifth day of the fifth month in the Chinese calendar, cannot be written as 5 May.

=== Holidays ===
Various traditional and religious holidays shared by communities throughout the world use the Chinese (Lunisolar) calendar:

==== Chinese New Year ====
The date of the Chinese New Year accords with the patterns of the lunisolar calendar and hence is variable from year to year.

The invariant between years is that the winter solstice, Dongzhi is required to be in the eleventh month of the year This means that Chinese New Year will be on the second new moon after the previous winter solstice, unless there is a leap month 11 or 12 in the previous year.

This rule is accurate; however, there are two other mostly (but not completely) accurate rules that are commonly stated:

- The new year is on the new moon closest to Lichun (typically 4 February).
- The new year is on the first new moon after Dahan (typically 20 January)

It has been found that Chinese New Year moves back by either 10, 11, or 12 days on the Gregorian calendar in most years. If it falls on or before 31 January, then it moves forward in the next year by either 18, 19, or 20 days.

The Chinese New Year was traditionally called the Yuan Dan (元旦) or Zheng Ri (正日). In Vietnam it is still known as Tết Nguyên Đán (節元旦). Traditionally it was the most important holiday of the year. It is an official holiday in China including Hong Kong, Macau, and Taiwan regions, and, Vietnam, Korea, the Philippines, Malaysia, Singapore, Indonesia, and Mauritius. It is also a public holiday in Thailand's Narathiwat, Pattani, Yala and Satun provinces, and is an official public school holiday in New York City.

==== Holidays with the day and month sharing the same number ====
- The Double Third Festival is on the third day of the third month.
- The Dragon Boat Festival, or the Duanwu Festival (端午節), is on the fifth day of the fifth month and is an official holiday in China including Hong Kong, Macau, and Taiwan regions.
- The Qixi Festival (七夕節) is celebrated in the evening of the seventh day of the seventh month.
- The Double Ninth Festival (重陽節) is celebrated on the ninth day of the ninth month.

==== Full moon holidays (holidays on the fifteenth day) ====
- The Lantern Festival is celebrated on the fifteenth day of the first month and was traditionally called the Yuan Xiao (元宵) or Shang Yuan Festival (上元節).
- The Zhong Yuan Festival is celebrated on the fifteenth day of the seventh month.
- The Mid-Autumn Festival is celebrated on the fifteenth day of the eighth month.
- The Xia Yuan Festival is celebrated on the fifteenth day of the tenth month.

==== Celebrations of the twelfth month ====
- The Laba Festival is on the eighth day of the twelfth month. It is the enlightenment day of Sakyamuni Buddha and in Vietnam is known as Lễ Vía Phật Thích Ca thành đạo.
- The Kitchen God Festival is celebrated on the twenty-third day of the twelfth month in northern regions of China and on the twenty-fourth day of the twelfth month in southern regions of China.
- Chinese New Year's Eve is also known as the Chuxi Festival and is celebrated on the evening of the last day of the traditional Chinese calendar. It is celebrated wherever the traditional Chinese calendar is observed.

==== Celebrations of solar-term holidays ====
- The Qingming Festival (清明节) is celebrated on the fifteenth day after the Spring Equinox.
- The Dongzhi Festival (冬至) or the Winter Solstice is celebrated.

==== Religious holidays based on the Chinese calendar ====
East Asian Mahayana, Daoist, and some Cao Dai holidays and vegetarian observances are based on the traditional Chinese calendar.

==== Double celebrations due to intercalary months ====
In the case when there is a corresponding intercalary month, the holidays may be celebrated twice. For example, in the hypothetical situation in which there is an additional intercalary seventh month, the Zhong Yuan Festival will be celebrated in the seventh month followed by another celebration in the intercalary seventh month. The next such occasion will be 2033, the first such since the calendar reform of 1645.

== Similar calendars ==
Like Chinese characters, variants of the Chinese calendar have been used in different parts of the Sinosphere throughout history: this includes Vietnam, Korea, Singapore, Japan and Ryukyu, Mongolia, and elsewhere.

Calendars of ethnic groups in mountains and plateaus of southwestern China and grasslands of northern China are based on their phenology and algorithms of traditional calendars of different periods, particularly the Tang and pre-Qin dynasties.

Korea, Vietnam, and the Ryukyu Islands adopted the Chinese calendar. In the respective regions, the Chinese calendar has been adapted into the Korean, Vietnamese, and Ryukyuan calendars, with the main difference from the Chinese calendar being the use of different meridians due to geography, leading to some astronomical events — and calendar events based on them — falling on different dates. The traditional Japanese calendar was also derived from the Chinese calendar (based on a Japanese meridian), but Japan abolished its official use in 1873 after Meiji Restoration reforms. Calendars in Mongolia and Tibet have absorbed elements of the traditional Chinese calendar but are not direct descendants of it.

Since the beginning of the month is determined by when the new moon occurs, other countries using this calendar use their own time standards to calculate it, resulting in deviations. The first new moon in 1968 was at 16:29 UTC on 29 January. Since North Vietnam used UTC+07:00 to calculate their Vietnamese calendar and South Vietnam used UTC+08:00 (Beijing time) to calculate theirs, North Vietnam began the Tết holiday at 29 January at 23:29 while South Vietnam began it on 30 January at 00:15. The time difference allowed asynchronous attacks in the Tet Offensive.

Many of the holidays of the traditional Chinese calendar are also celebrated in Japan, but since the Meiji era on the similarly numbered dates of the Gregorian calendar.

== See also ==
- Chinese calendar correspondence table
- Guo Shoujing, an astronomer tasked with calendar reform during the 13th century
- List of festivals in Asia
- Metonic cycle of 19 years, used to reckon leap years with intercalary months in the Hebrew and Babylonian calendars
