= Meza (village) =

Meza မဲဇာ
- Village
- Meza
- Location in Myanmar
- Coordinates: 24°08′21″N 96°02′13″E
- Country: Myanmar
- Region: Sagaing
- District: Katha District
- Township: Indaw Township
- Village tract: Meza
- Time zone: UTC+6.30 (MST)

Meza (မဲဇာ) is a village located in Meza village tract, Indaw Township, Katha District, Sagaing Region.

== Description ==
Meza is notable for being the subject of the historical poem "Meza Hill" yadu, composed by minister Letwe Thondara during his exile from court, which sent him to the Meza area by the king, Hsinbyushin. During the Konbaung era, Meza was a remote area surrounded by vast forests and mountains, which made it rarely visited. It was also known for its extremely cold climate and the prevalence of malaria. So, he composed a poem depicting the hardships and harsh conditions of the Meza area and submitted it as a plea to the king. Moved by his words, the king showed mercy, granted him a pardon, and allowed him to return to court.

During the Myanmar civil war, Meza became a conflict and war zone between the Myanmar Army and local People's Defence Forces.
