= Vesak =

Buddhist festival marking the birth, enlightenment and death of the Buddha

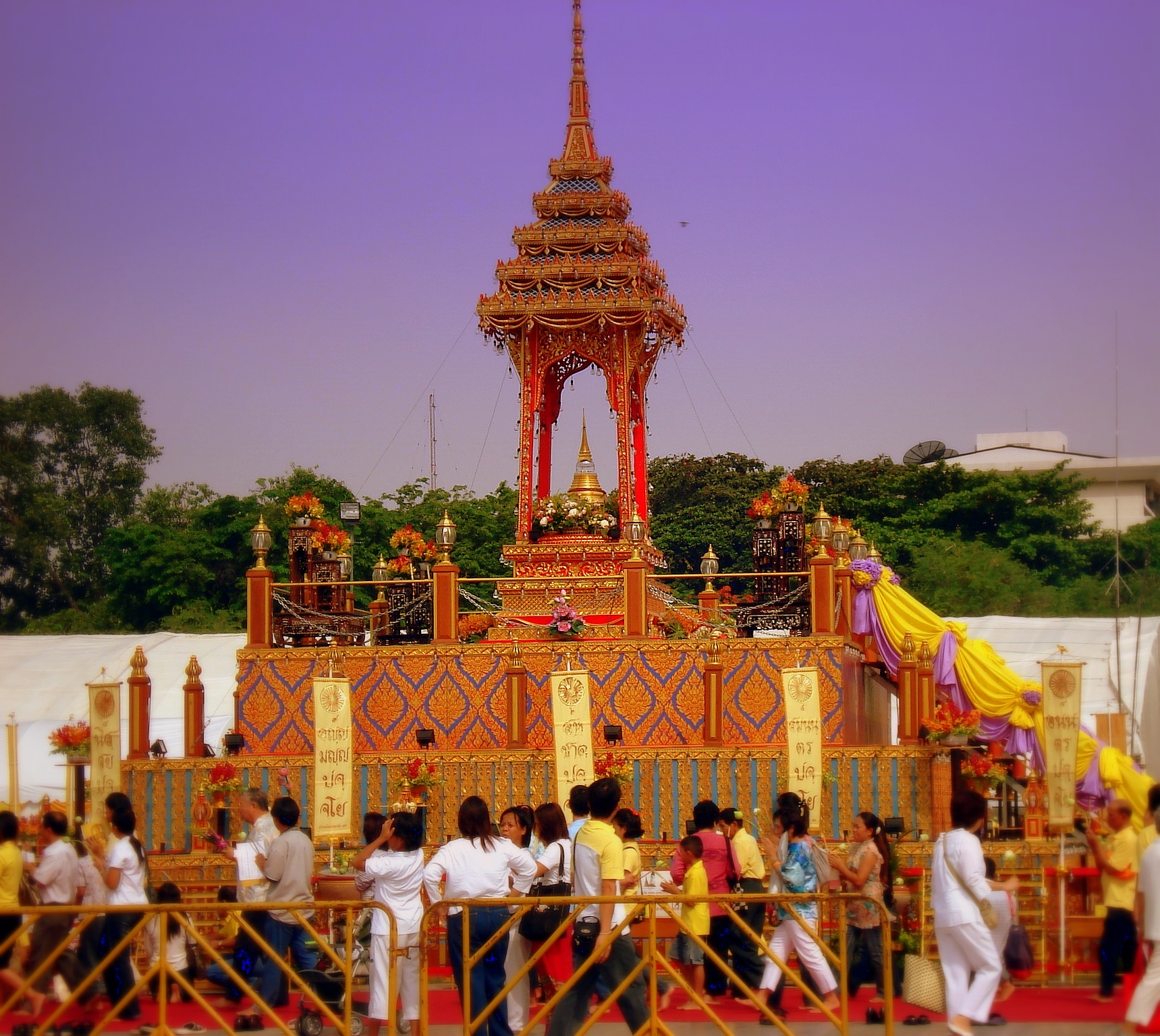
- Vesak Day celebrations at Sanam Luang in Bangkok, Thailand
- Official name: Vesak, Vesākha, Buddha Jayanti, Buddha Purnima, Vaishakh Purnima, Saka Dawa
- Also called: Buddha's Birthday or Buddha Day
- Observed by: Buddhist, Jains and Hindus
- Type: Buddhist
- Significance: To mark as commemoration of the birth, enlightenment and death of The Buddha
- Observances: Meditation, observing, and some Eight Precepts, partaking of vegetarian food, giving to charity, "bathing" the Buddha
- Date: Full moon of the lunar month of Vesākha, usually in April, May or June.
- 2025 date: 11 May (Cambodia, Laos, Thailand); 12 May (Indonesia, Malaysia, Singapore, Sri Lanka)
- 2026 date: 30 April (Myanmar); 1 May (Cambodia, India, Laos); 30 May (Sri Lanka); 31 May (Indonesia, Malaysia, Singapore, Thailand, Mongolia)
- 2027 date: 20 May
- Frequency: Annual
- Related to: Buddha's Birthday; Other related festivals Laba Festival (in China); Rohatsu (in Japan)

Vesak (Pali: Vesākha; Sanskrit: vaiśākha), also known as Buddha Jayanti, Buddha Purnima, Visak Bochea and Buddha Day, is a holiday traditionally observed by Buddhists in South Asia and Southeast Asia, as well as in Tibet and Mongolia. It is among the most important Buddhist festivals. The festival commemorates the birth, enlightenment (Pali: Nibbāna, Sanskrit: Nirvāṇa), and death (Parinirvāna) of Gautama Buddha in Theravada, Tibetan Buddhism, and Navayana.

The name Vesak is derived from the Pali term vesākha or Sanskrit vaiśākha for the lunar month of Vaisakha, which is considered the month of Buddha's birth. In Mahayana Buddhist traditions, the holiday is known by its Sanskrit name (Vaiśākha) or variants of that.

In the East Asian tradition, a celebration of Buddha's Birthday typically occurs around the traditional timing of Vesak, while the Buddha's awakening and death are celebrated as separate holidays that occur at other times in the calendar as Bodhi Day and Nibbāna Day. In the South Asian tradition, where Vesak is celebrated on the full moon day of the Vaisakha month, the Vesak day marks the birth, enlightenment, and the ultimate death of the Buddha.

== History ==
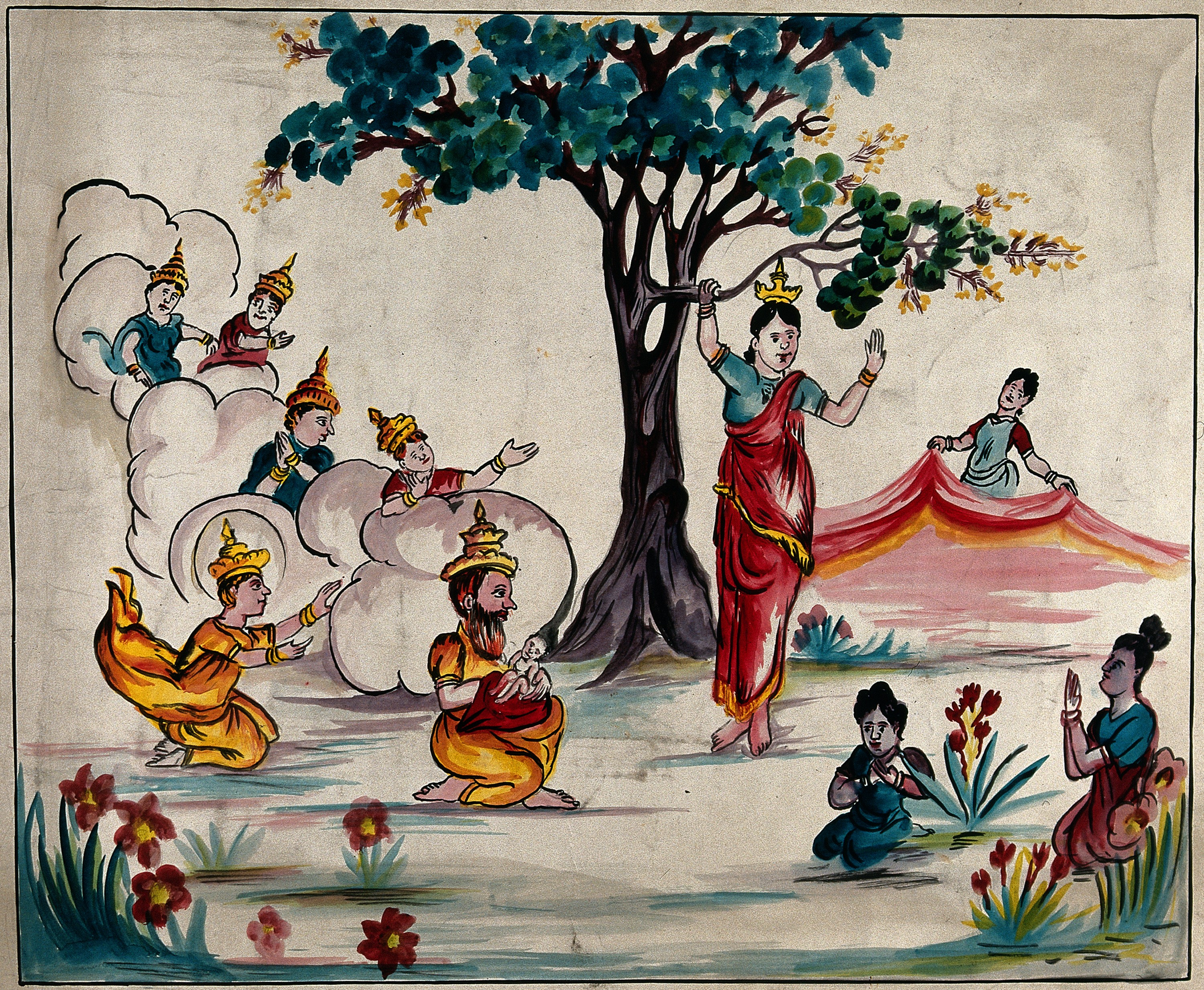
Queen Maya holds onto a branch of a tree while giving birth to the Buddha, who is received by the Śakra as other gods look on.

Although Buddhist festivals have centuries-old tradition, the first conference of the World Fellowship of Buddhists held in Sri Lanka in 1950 formalized the decision to celebrate Vesak as the Buddha's birthday across multiple Buddhist countries. The resolution that was adopted at the World Conference reads as follows:

That this Conference of the World Fellowship of Buddhists, while recording its appreciation of the gracious act of His Majesty, the Maharaja of Nepal in making the full-moon day of Vesak a Public Holiday in Nepal, earnestly requests the Heads of Governments of all countries in which large or small number of Buddhists are to be found, to take steps to make the full-moon day in the month of May a Public Holiday in honour of the Buddha, who is universally acclaimed as one of the greatest benefactors of Humanity.

On Vesak Day, Buddhists around the world commemorate three major events in the life of Buddha Gautama: his birth, enlightenment, and passing (Parinirvana). As Buddhism spread from India it was assimilated into many foreign cultures, and consequently Vesak is celebrated in many different ways all over the world. In India, Vaishakh Purnima day is also known as Buddha Jayanti day and has been traditionally accepted as Buddha's birth day.

In 2000, the United Nations (UN) resolved to internationally observe the day of Vesak at its headquarters and offices.

== Celebration ==
The month of May usually has one full moon, but as there are 29.5 days between full moons, occasionally there are two. If there are two full moons during the month of May, some countries (including Sri Lanka, Cambodia and Malaysia) celebrate Vesak on the first full moon, while others (Thailand, Singapore) celebrate the holiday on the full moon of 4th lunar month. The difference also manifests in the observance of other Buddhist holidays, which are traditionally observed at the local full moon.

On Vesak, devout Buddhists and followers alike assemble in their various temples before dawn for the ceremonial and honorable hoisting of the Buddhist flag and the singing of hymns in praise of the holy triple gem: The Buddha, The Dharma (his teachings), and The Sangha (his disciples). Devotees may bring simple offerings of flowers, candles and joss-sticks to lay at the feet of their teacher. These symbolic offerings are to remind followers that just as the beautiful flowers would wither away after a short while, and the candles and joss-sticks would soon burn out, so too is life subject to decay and destruction. Devotees are enjoined to make a special effort to refrain from killing of any kind. They are encouraged to partake only of vegetarian food for the day. In some countries, notably Sri Lanka, two days are set aside for the celebration of Vesak, and all liquor shops and slaughter houses are closed by government decree during the two days.

Also birds, insects and animals are released by the thousands in what is known as life release to give freedom to those who are in captivity, imprisoned, or tortured against their will. (The practice, however, is banned in some countries such as Singapore, as the released animals are unable to survive long-term or may adversely impact the local ecosystem if they do.)

Some devout Buddhists will wear simple white clothing and spend the whole day in temples with renewed determination to observe the eight precepts.

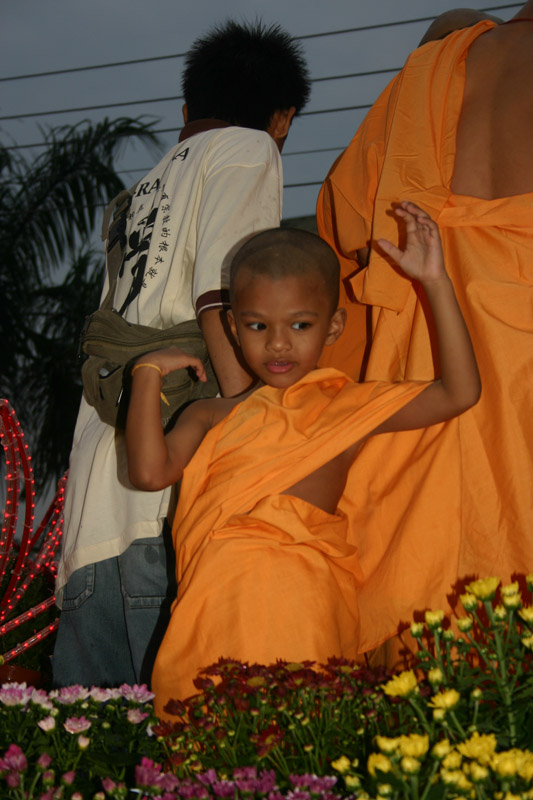
Young novice monk on Vesak Day Parade

Devout Buddhists undertake to lead a noble life according to the teaching by making daily affirmations to observe the Five Precepts. However, on special days, notably new moon and full moon days, they observe the eight precepts to train themselves to practice morality, simplicity, and humility.

Some temples also display a small statue of the Buddha in front of the altar in a small basin decorated with flowers, and filled with water or sweet tea for devotees to pour over the statue. This is symbolic of the cleansing of a practitioner's bad karma, and to reenact the events following the Buddha's birth, when devas and spirits made heavenly offerings to him.

Devotees are expected to listen to talks given by monks. On this day, monks will recite verses uttered by the Buddha twenty-five centuries ago to invoke peace and happiness for the government and the people. Buddhists are reminded to live in harmony with people of other faiths and to respect the beliefs of other people as the Buddha taught.

=== Bringing happiness to others ===
Video Korean Buddhist monks perform ritual dances and music on Buddha's Birthday.

Another focus of Vesak is bringing happiness to the unfortunate. Buddhists will distribute gifts in the form of cash during Vesak, or volunteering in various charitable homes throughout the country. Vesak is also expressed by not pandering to one's appetites, but by concentrating on useful activities, such as decorating and illuminating temples, or painting and creating scenes from the life of the Buddha for public dissemination. Devout Buddhists also provide refreshments and vegetarian food to followers who visit the temple to pay homage to the Buddha.

=== Paying homage to the Buddha ===
According to tradition the Buddha instructed followers how to pay him homage. Just before he died, he saw his faithful attendant Ananda, weeping. The Buddha advised him not to weep, instead to understand the universal law that all compounded things (including even his own body) must disintegrate. He advised everyone not to cry over the disintegration of the physical body but to regard his teachings (The Dharma) as their teacher from then on, because only the truth of the Dhamma is eternal, and not subject to the law of change. He also stressed that the way to pay homage to him was not merely by offering flowers, incense, and lights, but by truly and sincerely striving to follow his teachings.

=== Dates of observance ===
The exact date of Vesak is based on Asian lunisolar calendars and is primarily celebrated in Vaisakha, a month of both the Buddhist and Hindu calendars, hence the name Vesak. In Nepal, which is considered the birth-country of Buddha, it is celebrated on the full moon day of the Vaisakha month of the Hindu calendar, and is traditionally called Buddha Purnima, Purnima meaning the full moon day in Sanskrit. In Theravada countries following the Buddhist calendar, it falls on Uposatha Day, the full moon typically in the 5th or 6th lunar month.

Nowadays, in Sri Lanka, Nepal, India, Bangladesh and Malaysia, Vesak/Buddha Purnima is celebrated on the day of the first full moon in May in the Gregorian calendar.

For countries using the lunisolar calendar, the date for Vesak or Buddha's Birthday varies from year to year in the Gregorian calendar, but usually falls in April or May; in leap years it may be celebrated in June. In Bhutan it is celebrated on the 15th day of the fourth month of the Bhutanese lunar calendar. In Thailand, Laos, Singapore and Indonesia, Vesak is celebrated on the fourteenth or fifteenth day of the fourth month in the Chinese lunar calendar. In China, Korea, Vietnam and the Philippines, Buddha's Birthday is celebrated on the eighth day of the fourth month in the Chinese lunar calendar. In Japan, Buddha's Birthday is observed on the same date but in the Gregorian calendar, i.e. 8 April.

In Myanmar, Buddha's Birthday is celebrated as Full Moon of Kasun and is a public holiday. It is celebrated by watering the Bodhi tree and chanting. In large pagodas, music and dance is also performed as part of the celebrations.

=== In Southeast Asia ===
==== In Thailand ====
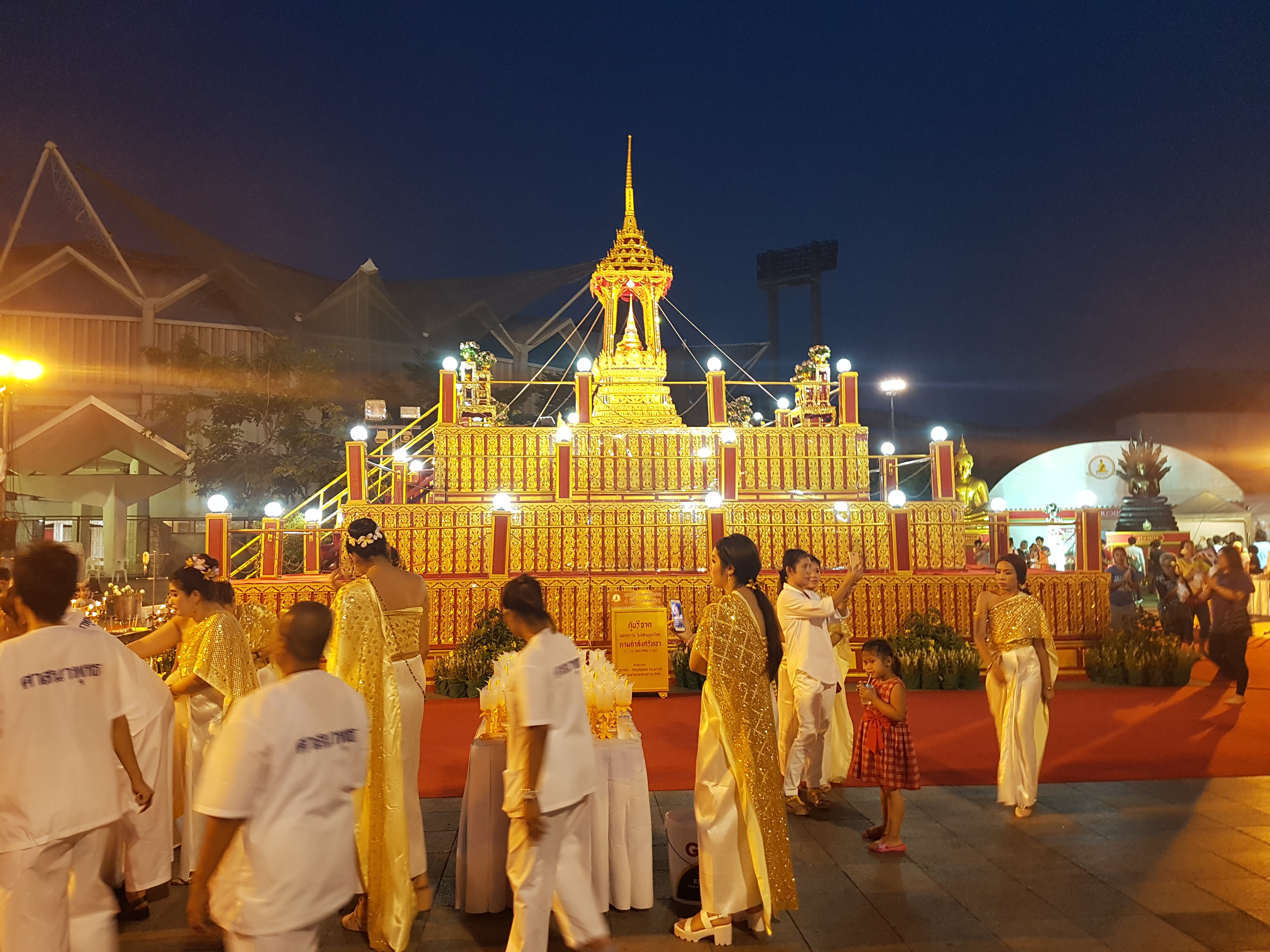
The people celebrate ritual of Vesak Day (Visakha Bucha Day) at Huamark Indoor Stadium in Bangkok, Thailand.

In Thailand, Vesak is known as Visakha Bucha Day (Thai: วันวิสาขบูชา) and is widely considered the most sacred Buddhist holiday in the country. It commemorates three major events in the life of the Buddha—his birth, enlightenment, and passing (Nirvana)—which are all believed to have occurred on the full moon of the sixth lunar month. As a national public holiday, the day is marked by a peaceful and reverent atmosphere, with a nationwide ban on alcohol sales to encourage respectful observance. Devotees often dress in white to symbolize purity and visit local temples (wats) starting at dawn to make merit by offering food, candles, and incense to monks. Each of the three circuits symbolizes one of the Three Jewels of Buddhism: the Buddha, the Dharma (his teachings), and the Sangha (the monastic community). Beyond temple rituals, many Thais practice kindness and compassion by making charitable donations to the less fortunate or releasing captive birds and fish to earn merit and eliminate negative karma.

The day's spiritual activities culminate in a beautiful evening ritual known as Wian Tian (Thai: เวียนเทียน). During this ceremony, worshippers participate in a candlelight procession, walking clockwise around a temple’s main chapel or ordination hall, completing three rounds in homage to the Buddha, the Dhamma and the Sangha.

==== In Myanmar (Burma) ====
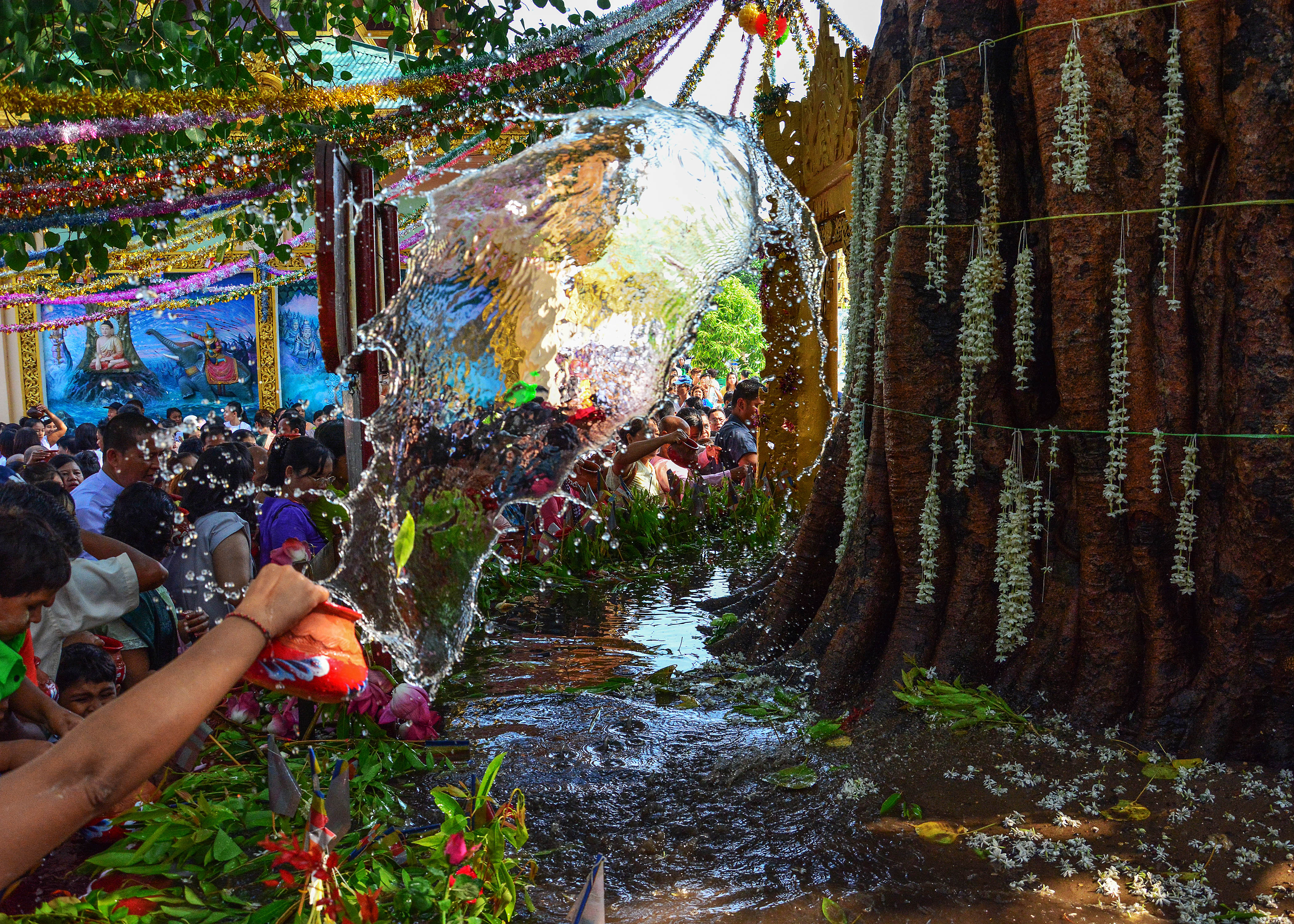
Burmese Buddhist devotees traditionally water Bodhi trees to mark Vesak.

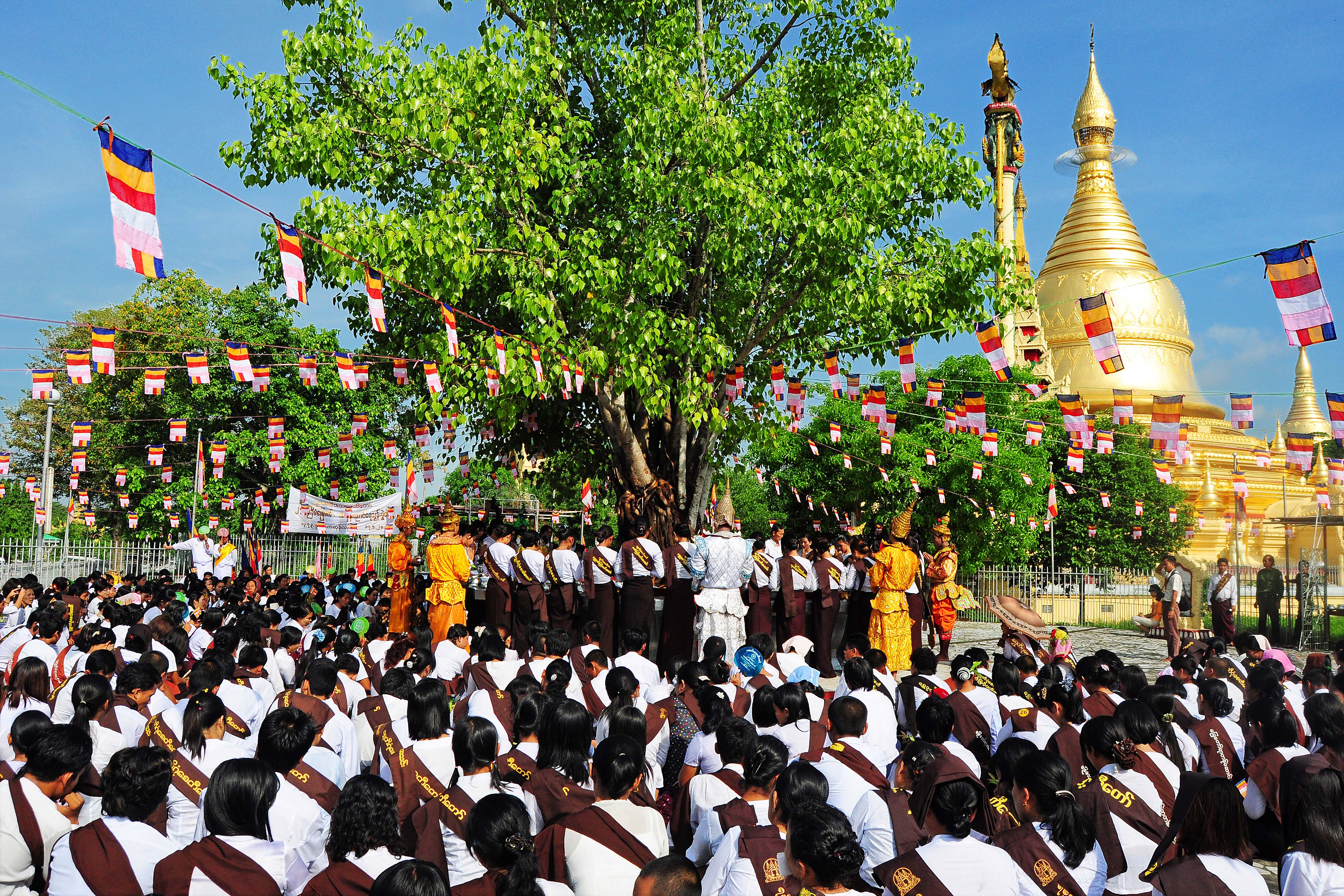
Burmese Buddhist devotees converge on a Bodhi tree in preparation for watering.

In Myanmar (Burma), Vesak is known as the Full Moon Day of Kason (Burmese: ကဆုန်လပြည့် ဗုဒ္ဓနေ့), which is the second month in the traditional Burmese calendar. The date is a public gazetted holiday. Buddhist devotees typically celebrate by offering alms to Buddhist monks, adhering to a more stringent set of Buddhist precepts, practicing meditation, and freeing fish and birds from captivity.

Throughout the country, the date is also marked by a traditional festival called the Nyaungye-thun or Bodhi tree water pouring festival (Burmese: ညောင်ရေသွန်းပွဲ), whereby devotees visit pagodas or monasteries (kyaung) to pour scented water to sacred Bodhi Trees using clay pots, to ensure the trees, which hold great significance in Buddhism, do not die during the peak of summer.

This tradition dates back to the pre-colonial era and continues to take place at major pagodas such as the Shwekyetyet and Shwekyetkya Pagodas in the former royal capital of Amarapura. A Konbaung era court poet, Letwe Thondara composed a complete set of yadu poems describing this festival in Meza Hill, near Katha, where he had been exiled by King Hsinbyushin.

==== In Laos ====
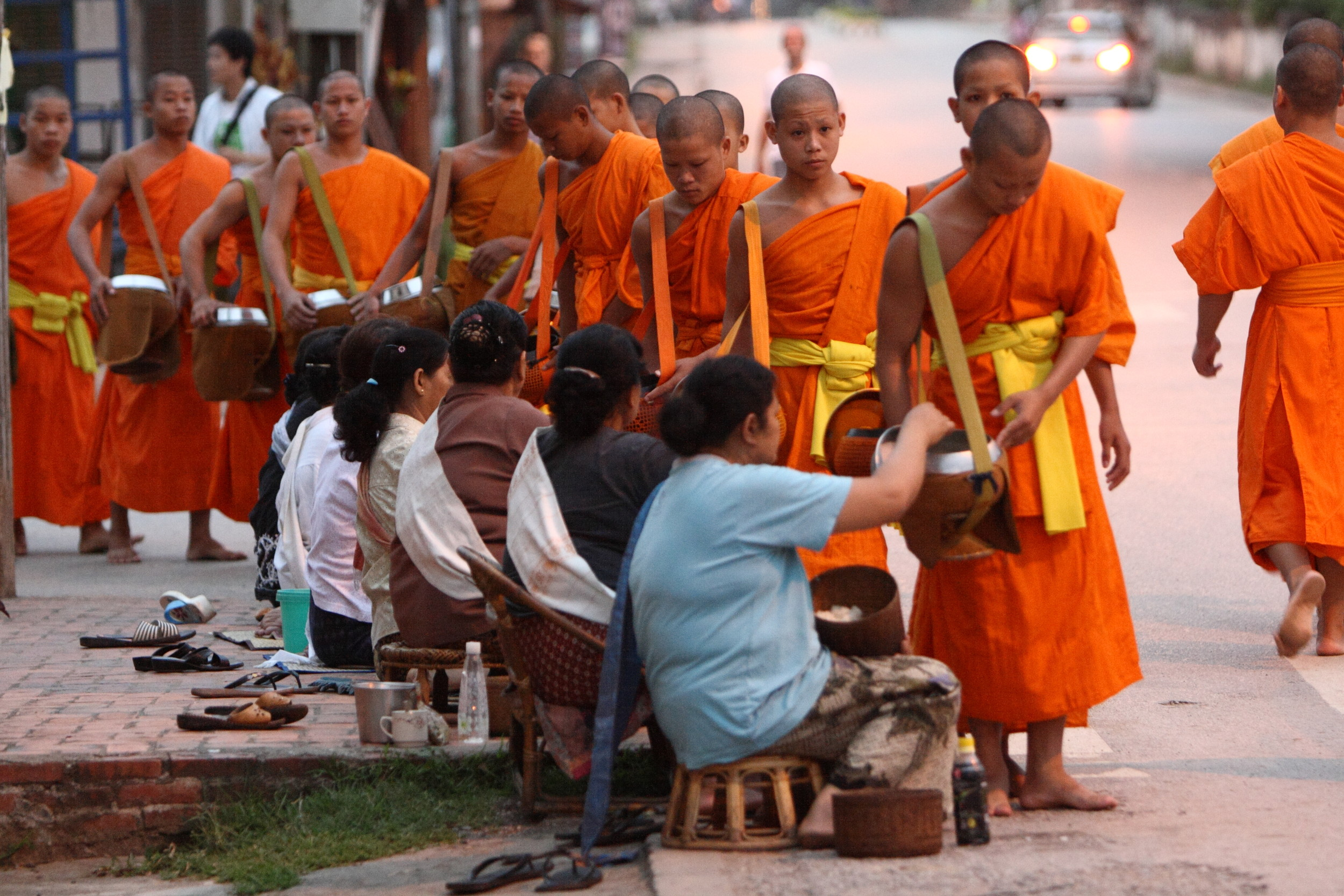
During Vesak, people give alms to monks (in the form of sticky rice) at dawn, in Luang Prabang, north Laos

In Laos, the festival is known as Visakha Bouxa (Lao: ວິສາຂະບູຊາ). It commemorates the birth, enlightenment, and death of the Buddha, which are all said to have happened on the same date. It is held around the month of May or Vesak, based on the lunar calendar. Celebrations include dances, poems, parades, processions, deep meditation, theatrical performances, and puppet shows.

One part of the Visakha Bouxa festival in Laos they called Boun Bang Fay (Lao: ບຸນບັ້ງໄຟ), or Rocket Festival. As this occurs during the hottest and driest season of the year, large homemade rockets are launched into the sky in an attempt to convince the celestial beings to send down rain. Traditionally, Buddhist monks made the rockets out of hollow bamboo tubes filled with gunpowder (among other things). Nowadays, lay people make the bang fai more like fireworks and hold competitions for the highest, fastest and most colorful rockets. The event takes place on both sides of the Mekhong River border between Thailand and the Lao People's Democratic Republic, and sometimes teams from the neighbouring countries will compete against each other. Tourists travel long distances to witness this now popular event.

==== In Malaysia ====
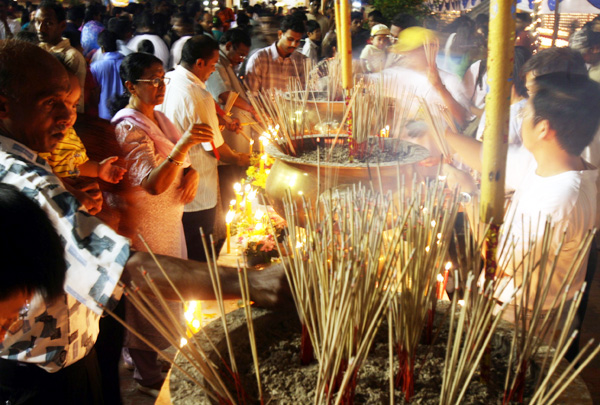
People thronged to the Maha Vihara Buddhist Temple during the Wesak Day celebration in Kuala Lumpur, Malaysia.

Celebrated by Buddhists to mark three momentous events in Buddha's life – his birth, enlightenment, and his departure from the human world, the Wesak celebration in Malaysia begins at dawn when devotees gather at Buddhist temples nationwide to meditate on the Eight Precepts. Donations – giving food to the needy and offerings of incense and joss sticks – and prayers are carried out. The sutras are chanted in unison by monks in saffron robes. The celebration is highlighted by a candle procession. Wesak Day in Malaysia is a national public holiday.

==== In Indonesia ====
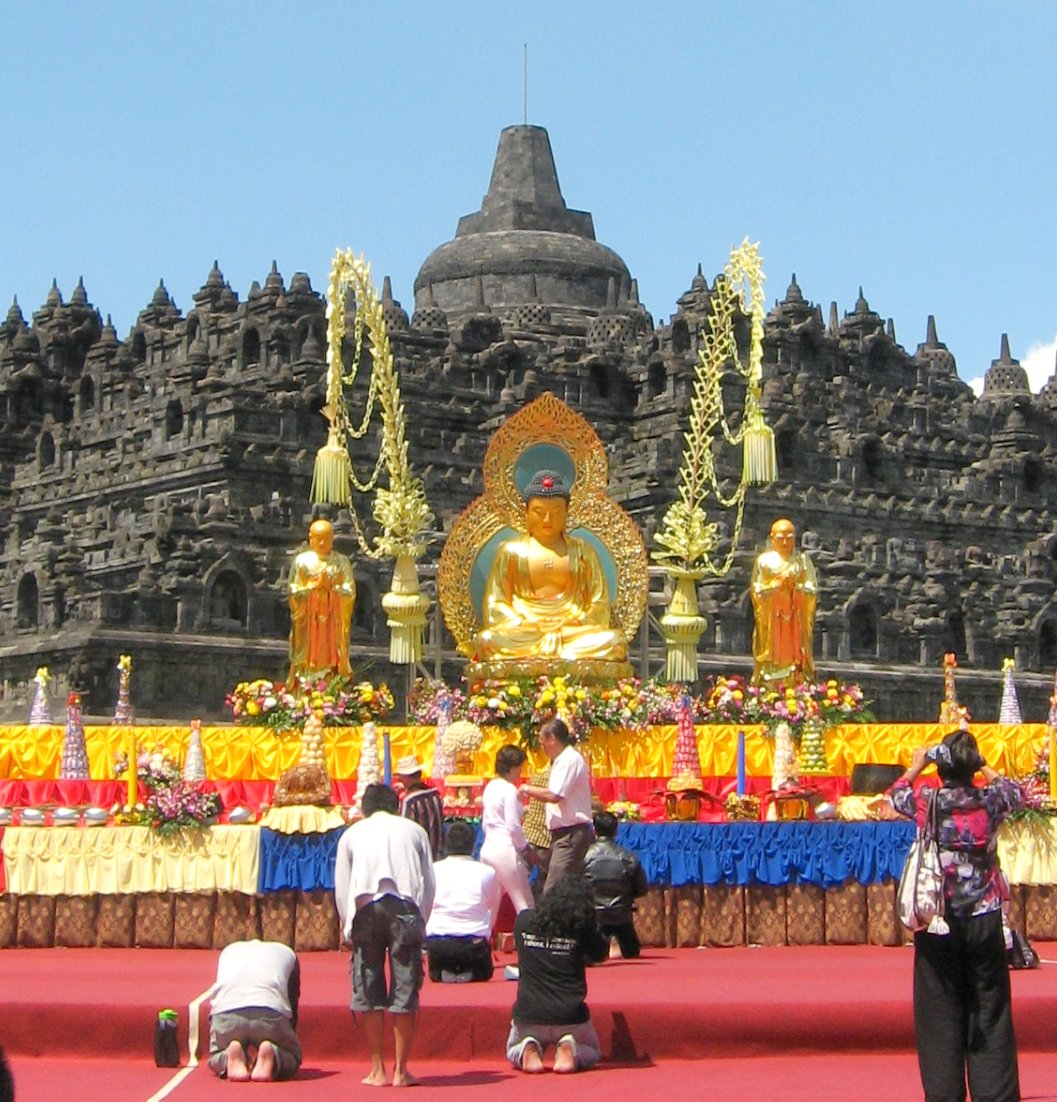
Vesak Day celebration in Borobudur temple, Indonesia

This significant and traditional holy day is observed throughout Indonesia, where it is known as Vesak Day (Indonesian: Hari Raya Waisak). At Borobudur, thousands of Buddhist monks will join to repeat mantras and meditate as they circuit the temple in a ritual called "Pradaksina". This is a form of tribute to the temple. Monks celebrate the special day by bottling holy water (which symbolises humility) and transporting flames (which symbolize light and enlightenment) from location to location. The monks also take part in the "Pindapata" ritual, where they receive charity from the people of Indonesia. Waisak Day in Indonesia has been celebrated as a national public holiday every year since 1983.

==== In the Philippines ====
In the Philippines, the date of Vesak (known as Filipino: Araw ni Buddha) follows the Chinese lunar calendar. Like China and Japan, Filipinos also bathe statues on this day.

==== In Singapore ====
In Singapore, Vesak Day was made a public holiday in 1955 after many public petitions, replacing Whit Monday. In the early decades of the 20th century, Vesak Day was associated with the Ceylonese community, which then celebrated it along with their National Day in a two-day event. After World War II, there was a movement to make Vesak Day a public holiday, with the Singapore Buddhist Association leading the petitions.

==== In Vietnam ====
In Vietnam, Vesak is also known as Phật Đản. From 1958 to 1975, Vesak was a national public holiday in South Vietnam. It was a public festival with floats, and lantern parades on the streets. Under the President Ngô Đình Diệm, a member of Vietnam's Catholic minority, South Vietnamese Buddhists were not allowed to celebrate Vesak, and faced many other restrictions.

On 8 May 1963, the day of Vesak in Vietnam, more than 3000 Vietnamese Buddhists were protesting President Diệm's ban on the Buddhist flag in the city of Huế. Tensions rose throughout the day, and as protesters gathered around a government radio station, the Vietnamese army and police were called in to disperse the crowd. Soon after, the army started to shoot and throw grenades into the crowd. Nine were killed, and four were seriously injured. These events are considered to be the beginning of Vietnam's Buddhist crisis, which culminated in a governmental coup and the assassination of President Diệm. Successive South Vietnamese Governments recognized Vesak as a public holiday and allowed the celebrations to go on.

However, after the Fall of Saigon, the day was no longer a public holiday. Since the 2000s, the festival has witnessed a revival across the country. The Vesak Celebration is officially held by the Vietnamese Buddhist Sangha every year and it aggregated international delegates for great events in 2008, 2014, 2019 (the 16th United Nations Day of Vesak Celebration).

=== In South Asia ===
==== In Sri Lanka ====
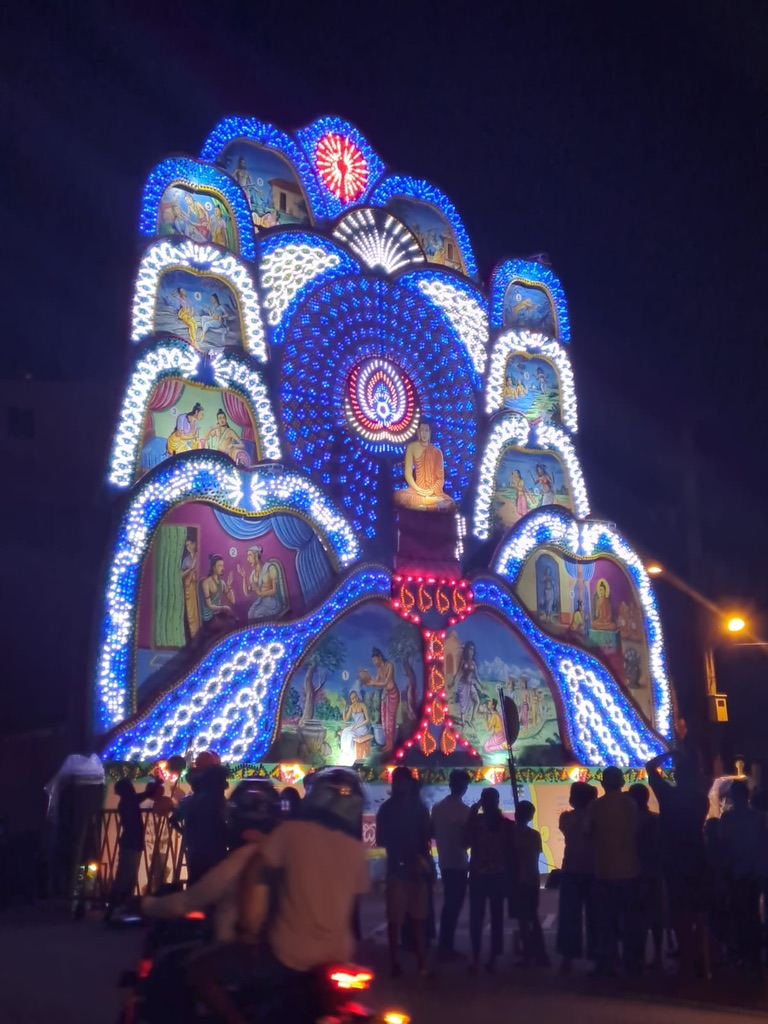
Vesak Pandol (Thorana) in Maharagama, Sri Lanka (2023)

Vesak is celebrated as a religious and a cultural festival in Sri Lanka on the full moon of the lunar month of Vesak (usually in the Gregorian month of May), for about one week, and this festival is often celebrated by people of different religions, as Buddhism is the religion of the majority of people in Sri Lanka. During this week, the selling of alcohol and fresh meat is usually prohibited, with slaughter houses also being closed. Celebrations include religious and alms-giving activities. Electrically lit pandals called thoranas are erected in locations mainly in Colombo, Kandy, Galle and elsewhere, most sponsored by donors, religious societies and welfare groups. Each pandal illustrates a story from the Jataka tales. Pandols (Thoranas) are electrically lit in almost all parts of the country, over 300 can be found all around the country every year.

In addition, colorful lanterns called "Vesak kuudu" are hung along streets and in front of homes. They signify the light of the Buddha, Dharma and the Sangha. Food stalls set up by Buddhist devotees called "dansälas" provide free food, ice-cream and drinks to passersby. Groups of people from community organizations, businesses and government departments sing bhakti gee (Buddhist devotional songs). Colombo experiences a massive influx of people from all parts of the country during this week.

==== In India ====
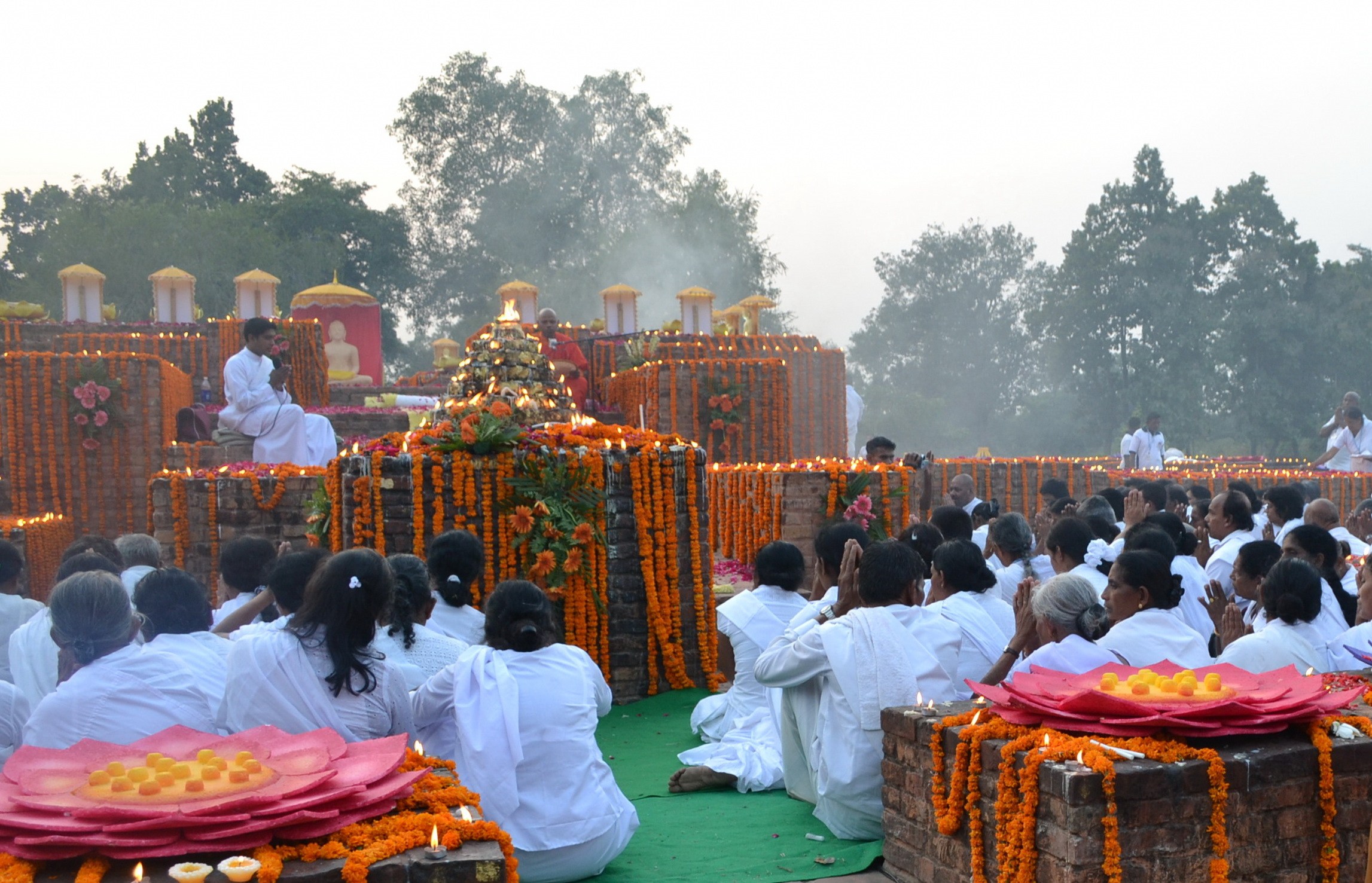
Vesak is celebrated in Jetavana, India, 2011.

In India, the full moon day of the Vaisakha month of the Hindu calendar is celebrated as Buddha Purnima. The festival is commonly known as Buddha Purnima, as Purnima means full moon day in Sanskrit and Hindi languages. It is also called Buddha Jayanti, with Jayanti meaning birthday in Sanskrit. The festival is a public holiday in India.

==== In Nepal ====
Vesak, commonly known in Nepal as "Buddha Jayanti" is widely celebrated all across the country, predominantly, Lumbini – the birthplace of Buddha, and Swayambhu – the holy temple for Buddhists, also known as "the Monkey Temple". The main door of Swayambhu is opened only on this very day, therefore, people from all over Kathmandu valley are stimulated by the event. Thousands of pilgrims from various parts of the world come together to celebrate Buddha's birthday at his birthplace, Lumbini. In Nepal, Buddha is worshipped by all religious groups, therefore "Buddha Jayanti" is marked by a public holiday. People donate foods and clothes to the needy and also provide financial aid to monasteries and schools where Buddhism is taught and practised.

==== In Bangladesh ====
Vesak Day is an important festival for all Bengali Buddhists. In Bangladesh, it is celebrated in Chittagong, Dhaka, and other Buddhist regions like Bandarban, Khagrachhari, Rangamati in the country. In the Bangla language, it is known as Buddho Purnima. It is also a public holiday in Bangladesh.

=== In East Asia ===
==== In Japan ====
In Japan, Vesak or hanamatsuri (花祭) is also known as Kanbutsu'e (灌仏会), Gōtan'e (降誕会)), Busshō'e (仏生会), Yokubutsu'e (浴仏会), Ryūge'e (龍華会) and Hanaeshiki (花会式). It is not a public holiday. It is based on a legend that nine dragons appeared in the sky on the Buddha's birthday and poured amṛta over him.

It used to be celebrated on the 8th day of the 4th month in the Chinese calendar based on one of the legends that proclaims the day as Buddha's birthday. At present, the celebration is observed on 8 April of the Solar Calendar since the government of Meiji Japan adopted the western solar calendar as the official calendar. Since the 8th day of the 4th month in the lunar calendar commonly falls in May of the current solar calendar, it is now celebrated about a month earlier.

In Japan, Vesak celebrations include pouring amacha (甘茶), a sweet tea made from Hydrangea macrophylla, on statues. In Buddhist religious sites such as temples and viharas, more involved ceremonies are conducted for lay Buddhists, priests, and monks and nuns.

==== In South Korea ====
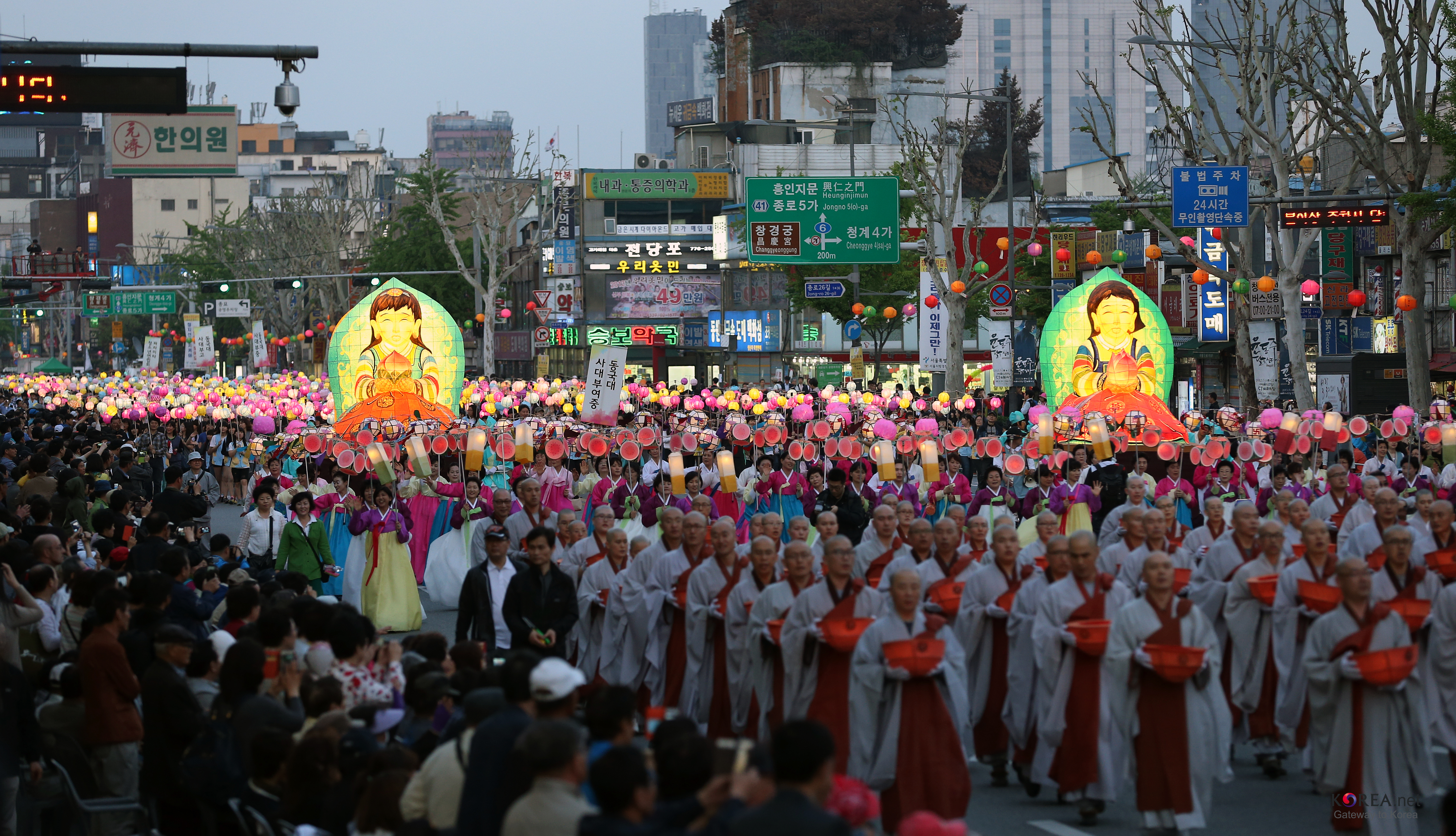
Lotus Lantern Festival (연등회, Yeon Deung Hoe) in Seoul, South Korea

In South Korea the birthday of Buddha is celebrated on the 8th day of the 4th month in the Korean lunar calendar (as well as in Hong Kong, Macau) and is an official holiday. This day is called 석가탄신일 (Seokga tansinil), meaning "Buddha's birthday" or 부처님 오신 날 (Bucheonim osin nal) meaning "the day when the Buddha came". It has now grown into one of the nation's biggest cultural festivals. Lotus lanterns cover the entire temple throughout the month which are often flooded down the street. On the day of Buddha's birth, many temples provide free meals and tea to all visitors. The breakfast and lunch provided are often sanchae bibimbap.

Yeondeunghoe (연등회) is a lantern-lighting festival in Korea celebrating the Buddha's Birthday. It is inscribed in UNESCO Intangible Cultural Heritage List from 2020 and enlisted as South Korean Intangible Cultural Property from 2012.

=== Outside Asia ===
==== In Canada ====
An annual event known as Vesak: Buddha's Birthday is celebrated in Toronto in its three major three Buddhist temples, that represent the three main branches of Buddhism. Held at Mississauga Celebration Square, it features a number of Buddhist-themed events and activities, as well as cultural acts from Asia, including China, Sri Lanka and Vietnam.

==== In United States ====
The celebration of Vesak or Buddha's Birthday in the United States differs among different Buddhist communities, depending on their ethnicity and nationality.

In Maui, Hawaii the community is usually invited to celebrate Vesak Day (the birth of Buddha) on the full moon of Vaisakha at Chua Tu Hanh Buddhist Temple in Kahului, where there is guided sitting meditation and dharma talk by a Zen master; which is followed by the bathing ceremony of the baby Buddha and a joyful meal to end the evening. The state of Hawaii has officially recognized April 8 of each year as "Buddha Day", which celebrates the birth of Gautama Buddha.

In the Bay Area of California, the Japanese celebration on April 8 has also been significant for several decades. In 1968 the first circumambulation of Mt. Tamalpais to celebrate Buddha's Birthday was conducted. Starting in 1969 at Tassajara Zen Mountain Center, Hana-Matsuri (花ーまつり - flower festival) was celebrated each spring. Dressed in formal black robes, the roughly 70 monks and students form a formal procession to the Horse Pasture with the leader periodically ringing a small, clear bell. A temporary stone altar was built under a huge oak tree in a gorgeous field of green grass and abundant wildflowers; a small statue of a baby Buddha was placed upon it in a metal basin. Then each person, in turn, approaches the altar, and ladle one thin-lipped bamboo dipperful of sweet green tea over the statue, bow, and walk to one side.

New York celebrates the International Lotus Lantern Parade, an annual event held at Union Square Park. The event celebrates the Buddha's birthday and Yeon Deung Hoe (연등회,燃燈會), a Korean lantern celebration that is held during Vesak. The festival features a number of Buddhist themed events and is started off by numerous Buddhist centers of Japanese, Korean and Sri Lankan origins for example.

== United Nations ==
On 15 December 1999 the United Nations General Assembly adopted resolution 54/115, entitled 'International recognition of the Day of Vesak at United Nations Headquarters and other United Nations offices'. The proposal to declare Vesak as an international public holiday was tabled at the United Nations General Assembly by Sri Lanka. The resolution internationally recognized the Day of Vesak to acknowledge the contributions that The Buddha and Buddhism have made for over two and a half millennia. It also called for annual commemoration of the day at the United Nations Headquarters, in New York, UNESCO and other United Nations offices around the world.

International celebrations since 2000 included the first Vesak celebration in the United Nations (New York) on May 15, 2000. Thirty-four countries were represented. The Day of Vesak is an official holiday for the United Nations offices in many of the countries in Southeast Asia.

=== International Vesak summit ===
Thailand has hosted an international Vesak summit 11 times, Vietnam 3 times, and Sri Lanka once.

- May 25, 2004 in Phutthamonthon, Thailand
- May 18–21, 2005 in Bangkok, Thailand
- 2006 to 2013 in Thailand
- 2014 in Vietnam
- 2015 in Thailand
- 2016 in Thailand
- 2017 in Sri Lanka
- 2018 in Thailand
- 2019 in Vietnam
- 2024 in Thailand

== Local renditions ==
There are multiple local renditions of the Vesak festival name, varying by local language, including:

- Assamese: বুদ্ধ পূর্ণিমা Buddho Purnima
- Bengali: বুদ্ধ পূর্ণিমা Buddho Purnima, বুদ্ধ জয়ন্তী Buddho Joyonti
- Burmese: ကဆုန်လပြည့် ဗုဒ္ဓနေ့ Kasonelapyany Buddhanae, "Full Moon Day of Kason"
- Cebuano: Adlaw sa Buddha (Buddha's Day)
- Chinese: 佛陀誕辰紀念日; pinyin: Fótuó dànchén jìniàn rì, (Buddha's Birthday or Birthday of the Gautama Buddha), 佛誕 (Fódàn, Birthday of the Buddha), 浴佛節 (Yùfójié, Occasion of Bathing the Buddha), 衛塞節 (Wèisāi jié Vesak Day), 偉大的衛塞節花節偉大的滿月 (Wěidà de wèi sāi jié huā jié wěidà de mǎnyuè Great Vesak Day Flower Festival Full Moon of Flower Moon)
- Dzongkha: སྟོན་པའི་དུས་ཆེན་༥ འཛོམས་ Dhüchen Nga Zom
- French: Vesak
- Greek: Βεσάκ
- Hindi: बुद्ध पूर्णिमा Buddha Pūrṇimā, बुद्ध जयन्ती Buddha Jayantī, वैशाख पूर्णिमा Vaisākh Pūrṇimā
- Ilocano: Aldaw ni Buddha (Day of the Buddha)
- Japanese: 花祭り Hanamatsuri (Flower Festival)
- Khmer: វិសាខបូជា Visak Bochea
- Kannada: ಬುದ್ಧ ಪೌರ್ಣಮಿ Buddha Pournami
- Korean: 석가 탄신일; Hanja: 釋迦誕辰日; RR: Seokka Tanshin-il (Birthday of the Shakyamuni Buddha), Korean: 부처님오신날 (Buddha's Day)
- Lao: ວິສາຂະບູຊາ Visakha Bouxa
- Malay:
  - Hari Wesak (Jawi: هاري ويسک, Malaysian)
  - Hari Vesak (Singapore),
  - Hari Waisak or Hari Raya Waisak, Trisuci Waisak (Indonesian)
- Malayalam: വൈശാഖ പൗർണമി, ബുദ്ധ പൂർണിമ, ബുദ്ധ ജയന്തി
- Mon: တ္ၚဲကျာ်ဗုဒ္ဓဂိတုပသာ်ပေၚ် "Full Moon Day of Pasāk"
- Mongolian: Бурхан Багшийн Их Дүйчин Өдөр ᠪᠤᠷᠬᠠᠨ
  ᠪᠠᠭᠰᠢ ᠶ᠋ᠢᠨ
  ᠶᠡᠬᠡ
  ᠳᠦᠢᠴᠡᠩ
  ᠡᠳᠦᠷ Burkhan Bagshiin Ikh Düichinn Ödör (Lord Buddha's Great Festival Day)
- Marathi: बुद्ध पौर्णिमा Buddha Pournima
- Nepali: बुद्ध पुर्णिमा Buddha Purnima, बुद्ध जयन्ति Buddha Jayanti
- Newar: स्वांया पुन्हि Swānyā Punhi
- Odia: ବୁଦ୍ଧ ପୂର୍ଣ୍ଣିମା Buddha Purnimā
- Russian: День рождения Гаутамы Будды Den' rozhdeniya Gautamy Buddy (Birthday of the Gautama Buddha), Russian: День Гаутамы Будды (Den' Gautamy Buddy Gautama Buddha's Day), Russian: Великий День Цветов Весак (Velikiy Den' Tsvetov Vesak Great Vesak Flower Day), Russian: День Весака (Den' Vesaka Vesak Day), Russian: День Будды (Den' Buddy Buddha's Day), Russian: Буддийское рождество (Buddiyskoye rozhdestvo Buddhist Christmas)
- Sinhala: වෙසක් Wesak
- Spanish: Día de vesak
- Tamil: விசாகத் திருநாள் Vicākat Tirunāḷ
- Tagalog: Araw ni Bisyak, Araw ni Buddha (Buddha's Day), Kaarawan ni Buddha (Buddha's Birthday)
- Telugu: బుద్ధ పౌర్ణమి Buddha Pournami or alternatively వైశాఖ పౌర్ణమి Vaisakha Pournami
- Thai: วิสาขบูชา RTGS: Wisakhabucha
- Tibetan: ས་ག་ཟླ་བ་དུས་ཆེན, Wylie: sa ga zla ba dus chen, THL: Sa Ga Dawa Dü Chen
- Vietnamese: Lễ Phật Đản; Chữ Hán: 禮佛誕 (Birthday of the Buddha), Vietnamese: Ngày hội hoa Phật (Buddha's Lord Flower Festival Day)

== See also ==
- Asalha Puja
- Māgha Pūjā
- Buddha's Birthday
