= Meza Hill =

Form of Burmese poetry

"Meza Hill," also known as the "Foot of Meza Hill" (မဲဇာတောင်ခြေ), is a yadu (a form of Burmese poetry) composed in 1764 by court minister Letwe Thondara during his exile from court to Meza area. During his time of hardship in the Meza area, he composed a yadu poem, expressing his unwavering loyalty to the royal capital. The "Meza Hill" yadu stands out for its vivid portrayal of personal experiences, refined structure, and impactful use of language. Letwe Thondara's heartfelt expressions resonated deeply, prompting King Hsinbyushin to grant him a pardon and summon him back to the royal court.

== History ==
Letwe Thondara was a court minister and poet. He served as secretary for the council, with the title of Let-wè Thon-dara, under the first seven kings of the succeeding Konbaung dynasty, eventually becoming a judge of the supreme court. He was exiled by the third king, Hsinbyushin, to the penal colony of Meza Hill area (in present-day Katha District), in a valley over a hundred miles north of the capital Shwebo, for lèse-majesté.

Meza area was a remote area surrounded by vast forests and mountains, which made it rarely visited. It was also known for its extremely cold climate and the prevalence of malaria. While there, he wrote his two famous poems, both yadu, which described his grief at being exiled. The poems moved the king to recall him after two months and restore him to the court.

== Poem ==
(In Burmese):

"မဲဇာတောင်ခြေ၊ စီးတွေတွေတည့်၊ မြစ်ရေဝန်းလည်၊ မြိုင်တောဆီက၊ ရွှေပြည်ကိုသာ၊ တရှာတော့မိ၊ မိုးရှိရှိလျှင်၊ သီရိကျက်သရေ၊ တက်ဖြိုးဝေသား၊ အောင်မြေကြော့ကြော့၊ ကုန်းမော့မော့နှင့်၊ ဘိုးတော်ကောင်းမှု၊ တည်ထားပြုသည်၊ ဇမ္ဗူ့ဆီမီး၊ ခြောက်ရောင်ညီးမျှ၊ ဂူကြီးသခင်၊ ရွှေလင်းပင်နှင့်၊ ရွှေခြင်္သေ့မြွေ၊ စ၍ရေသော်၊ ရွှေစေတီကြီး၊ အသီးသီးတည့်၊ ပိတ်ဆီးခြယ်သန်း၊ လျှပ်ရောင်တန်းမျှ၊ ရွှေနန်းရွှေဘုံ၊ အလုံးစုံကို၊ အာရုံမျက်မြင်၊ ဖူးမြှော်ချင်၍၊ သည်တွင်ရွှေမြို့၊ သည်သို့စေတီ၊ သည်ဆီရွှေနန်း၊ ဖြောင့်တန်းတော့မည်၊ စိတ်ကရည်သည်။ ။ ရွှေပြည်ဌာန ဝေးသောကြောင့်။

သဲသာသောင်မြေ၊ မြစ်ကမ်းခြေလည်း၊ အကြေတပြင်၊ တို့အောင်ခွင်ဝယ်၊ ရေရှင်ပတ်ဝန်း၊ ပျော်ဖွယ်ထွန်းလိမ့်၊ တကျွန်းလောက်ပင်၊ ဝေးမည်ထင်ခဲ့၊ စီးသွင်ညိုရစ်၊ မဲဇာမြစ်လည်း၊ ထစ်ထစ်ထွန်းဘိ၊ ချုံအတိနှင့်၊ တောကြီးဆိတ်ညံ၊ ဆီးကျံကျံဝယ်၊ ဓူဝံမပေါ်၊ မမြော်ပါရ၊ နေကိုတလည်း၊ ဘယ်ကရှေ့နောက်၊ ဘယ်တောင်မြောက်ဟု၊ တွေးထောက်မမှန်၊ ဖန်ဖန်အံ့သြ၊ ကြံတိုင်းမောစွ၊ ဘယ်တောဘယ်မြိုင်၊ မသိနိုင်ခဲ့၊ မခိုင်စိတ်ဝမ်း၊ နေ့တိုင်းလွမ်းရှင့်၊ ကင်းစမ်းတောင်က၊ လေဦးစ၍၊ နောက်မှလေရှည်၊ အတည်တည်သည်။ ။ လေပြည်လာက အေးသောကြောင့်။

ပွဲခါညောင်ရေ၊ သွန်းမြဲပေတည့်၊ ရိုသေသဒ္ဓါ၊ ထုံးစဉ်လာဖြင့်၊ မဲဇာရပ်သူ၊ တောင်းဆုယူသည်၊ ရွှေဂူတော်နှင့်၊ ရှုတိုင်းတင့်သား၊ မိုးမြင့်သီခေါင်၊ မဲဇာချောင်က၊ တစ်တောင်လုံးမှိုင်း၊ စ၍ဆိုင်းသော်၊ တောင်တိုင်းယှက်၍၊ ဝန်းကာဝှေ့သည်၊ တောင်ငွေ့ဝေေ၀၊ အထွေထွေနှင့်၊ လေလည်းရောရော၊ မိုးမပါဘဲ၊ သံဝါဖြောက်ဖြောက်၊ ဆီးနှင်းပေါက်လည်း၊ မိုးလောက်ပြင်းထန်၊ သွန်းချပြန်သော်၊ ယုဂန်ထင်ရှား၊ တောင်တော်ဖျားက၊ ရထားယာဉ်သာ၊ နေစကြာလည်း၊ ရောင်ဝန်မထွန်း၊ ချမ်းရှာလွန်း၍၊ တည့်မွန်းချိန်နေ၊ ရောက်လွယ်စေဟု၊ စေ့ရေလှည့်လည်၊ တလျက်မည်သည်။ ။ နေခြည်ဖြာမှ နွေးသောကြောင့်။"

(Translation):

"Upon Meza Hill, where swift rivers clasp its pale, sandy shores, From the shadowed depths of this vast wilderness, My wandering thoughts return unbidden to the Golden City.

On the high ground of Victory’s Soil, ancient shrines ascend, Their splendor a radiant legacy left by our noble Ancestors. The Lamp of the World gleams there in six resplendent hues, Illuminating the Lion Throne Pagoda, the Shwe Lin Bin, And the venerable Cavern Temple.

These sacred monuments flash before me like sudden lightning— Clear, vivid, and piercing to the heart. Longing takes hold of me; I yearn to behold once more the shrines And the golden spires of the Palace. My imagination betrays me: ‘Here lies the city… there rise the shrines… surely this is the palace.’ Yet still the Golden City lies far beyond my reach.

The gentle beaches and flowing waters of my home downstream Seem now like memories from another world. Here, the brown Meza winds its lonely path Through forests silent and unbroken, Its towering trees and tangled thickets closing in on every side. The rising mists veil even the northern star, And I lose all sense of east and west, north and south.

My breath falters within this ancient woodland; Each day my strength ebbs away As the weight of homesickness presses upon me. Cold winds sweep down from the Kinwun Range, The western gusts cutting through me like blades.

The folk of Meza, steadfast in their devotion, Hold their festival to bless the sacred Banyan Tree, Gathering at the radiant Cavern Shrine to offer prayer.

But when the valley mists rise to cloak the Hill, They shroud the mountain ranges, rush with the restless wind, And descend as though the heavens themselves were breaking. The sun’s chariot atop Yugan Hill shivers in the biting cold. I pray for the hours to turn toward noon, For only when the sun’s warm spear breaks through the gloom Does this frigid land relent."

— Letwe Thondara
