= Mawgun =

Form of Burmese poetry

A mawgun (Burmese: မော်ကွန်း, pronounced [mɔ̀gʊ́ɰ̃]; originated from archaic Burmese: အမူကွန်း, pronounced [ʔəmùgʊ́ɰ̃]) is a form of Burmese poem which is often used to record a significant event meant to last.

== History ==
=== Early times ===
In the Pagan era, donors recorded their donations in the prose form of mawgun. However, since from the Ava era, mawguns are composed in the form of poetry rather than prose. The oldest mawgaun in the Burmese literature industry was "Pyayson mawgun" by Shin Htwe Nyo during the reign of Thihathura I.

Following Shin Htwe Nyo, the most prominent mawgun poets were Shin Mahasilavamsa and Shin Raṭṭhasāra of Ava. They both composed many well-known mawguns. Mawguns composed during their times were said to be the high-class ones, and their times was referred as the era of mawguns.

=== Later ===
Mawgun did not develop in the First Toungoo Empire. Only Shin Thankho composed Yadanapyaungmon Sindaw Bwe Mawgun.

Mawguns became popular again in the Konbaung dynasty. It was Wetmasut Nawade who was a famous mawgun poet of his time, for he wrote at least 15 mawguns. Three of them pertain to Burmese conquests, including Ar-than-naing Mawgun and Rakhine Naing Mawgun on the conquests of Assam and Rakhine respectively, as well as the missing Dawei Naing Mawgun on the takeover of Dawei; he also wrote 'Tayoke Than Yauk Mawgun (1821), which details the arrival of a group of Chinese officials to Burma. Wilathini Sindaw Bwe Mawgun of Wetmasut Nawade is the first-class mawgun amongst the Sindaw Bwe mawguns (records of receiving white elephants), followed by Shweminbhone Sindaw Bwe Mawgun of U Nyo.

== Format and subject ==
Mawgun is a kind of poem which uses four syllables in each line, like the classical Burmese verse.

Most mawguns are the descriptions of the royal white elephants, royal palaces, royal boats, the wars, the lakes and the pagodas.

== See also ==
- Burmese literature
