= Maniket =

Maniket (Burmese: မဏိကက်, also spelt Manikhet), from Pali: Maṇikakkha (မဏိကက္ခ), is considered to be the earliest extant play in modern-day Myanmar, complete with dialogue, song lyrics, and stage directions. The storyline of Manikhet is based on the Sattadhanu Jataka, the 20th story in the Paññāsa Jātaka, a non-canonical collection of stories of the Buddha's past lives from Lan Na.

== Origins ==
The play is generally attributed to Padethayaza, a minister during the Nyaungyan period, who composed a pyo (a lyrical poem) in 1714. Other historians note that Manikhet may have originated during the reign of Bodawpaya, whose crown prince appointed a literary committee in December 1789 to translate songs and plays acquired from Thailand after Burmese conquest.

== Story ==
Manikhet is the name of a celestial horse with a precious stone eye. The story follows the life of Suthanu, a prince in the kingdom of Varanasi, and his accompanying horse, Manikhet.
