= Maung Myat San =

Letwe Thondara (Burmese: လက်ဝဲသုန္ဒရ [lɛʔ wɛ́ θòʊnda̰ja̰], also spelt Let-wè Thôn-dara), was the honorary title of a classical Burmese poet and minister during the Konbaung dynasty. of the Konbaung Dynasty of the late 18th and early 19th centuries. He wrote two of the five 'immortal' Burmese poems (or songs).

== Biography ==
Letwe Thondara was born Myat San (Burmese: မြတ်စံ [mjaʔ sã̀]) in 1736 or 1737 in the village of Magyidon, near Shwebo, first capital of the Konbaung Dynasty. He died sometime shortly before the First Anglo-Burmese War in 1824, during the reign of Bagyidaw (coronation 1819). He is known to have written about 15 poems of various kinds, including pyo, mawgun, yadu and a legal treatise in verse.

== Court positions and exile ==
Myat San was a writer to the Royal Council of the last king of the Toungoo dynasty, Mahadhammaraza Dipadi. He served in similar positions, such as secretary for the council, with the title of Let-wè Thon-dara, under the first seven kings of in the succeeding Konbaung dynasty, eventually becoming a judge of the supreme court.

Myat San was exiled by the third king, Hsinbyushin, to the penal colony of Meza Hill (in present-day Katha District), in a valley over a hundred miles north of the capital Shwebo, for lèse-majesté. While there he wrote his two famous poems, both yadu, which described his grief at being exiled. The poems moved the king to recall him after two months and restore him to the court.
