= Padethayaza =

Burmese minister and writer (c.1683–1754)

- ပဒေသရာဇာ
- Born: c. 1683; Kingdom of Burma
- Died: 1754 (aged 70–71)
- Resting place: Thanlyin
- Occupation: Writer
- Writing career
- Language: Burmese
- Period: Nyaungyan period

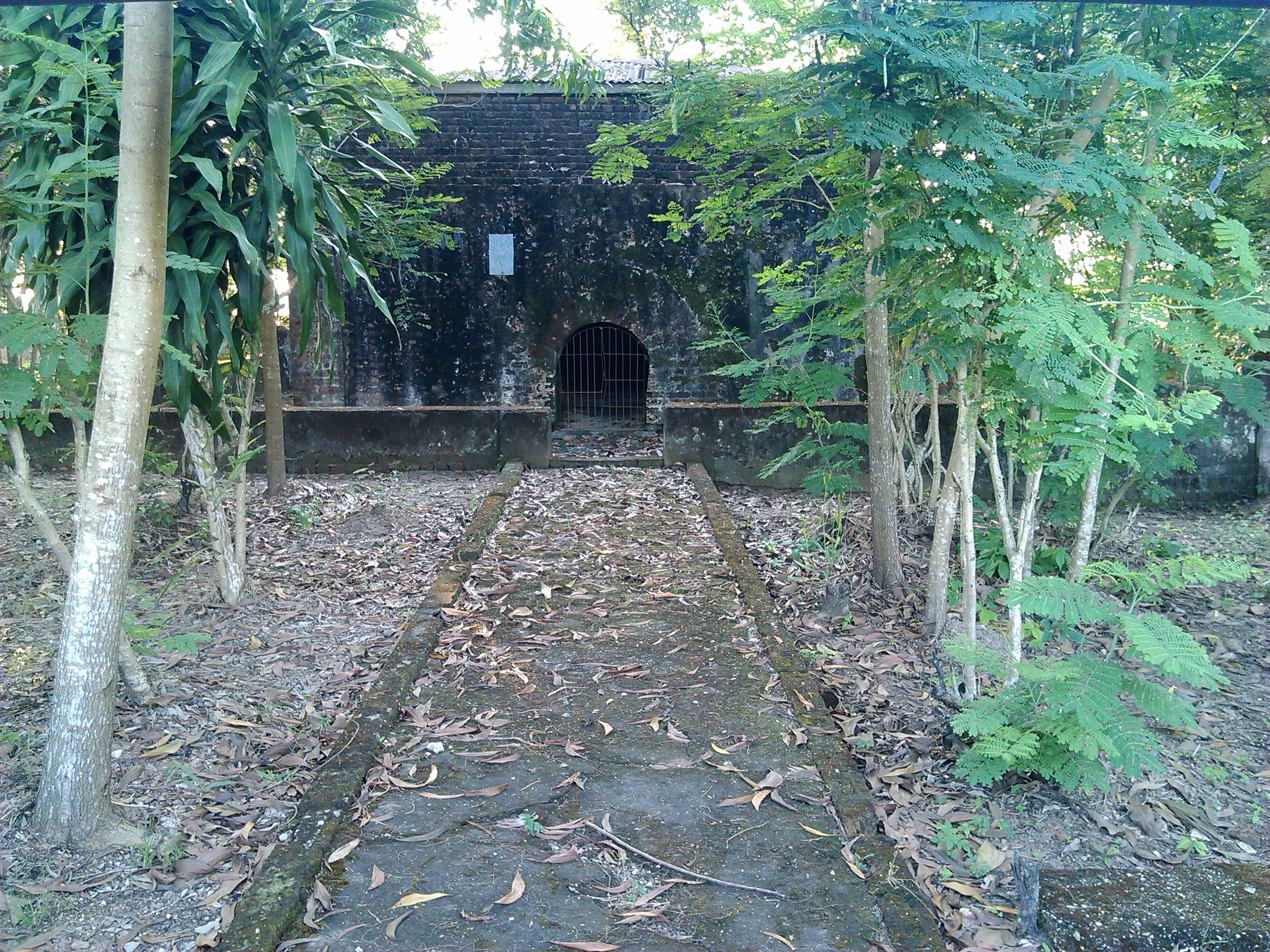
Padethayaza's tomb in Thanlyin (formerly Syriam)

Padethayaza (Burmese: ပဒေသရာဇာ; c. 1683–1754), also spelt Padesarājā, was a minister who served the last three monarchs at the Nyaungyan court, and was a prominent writer and poet. He is known for composing pyo, lyrical poems based on the Jataka tales. While he wrote traditional works pertaining to Buddhism, he was also known for expanding his repertoire, drawing from Hindu tales, apocryphal birth stories of the Buddha (Paññāsa Jātaka), current events such as the arrival of Thai envoys to the Burmese court, and village life for peasants (in the form of folk songs). After the demise of the Nyaungyan court in 1754, Padethayaza was captured and taken to Pegu (Bago).

== List of works ==
- Manikhet Pyo (မဏိခက်ပျို့)
