= Shin Mahasilavamsa =

Theravadin Burmese Buddhist monk and classical poet

- ရှင်မဟာသီလဝံသ
- Title: Shin Maha

Personal life
- Born: Maung Nyo; 1453 Taungdwingyi
- Died: 1518 (aged 64–65)
- Other name: Shin Maha Thilawuntha
- Occupation: Buddhist monk

Religious life
- Religion: Buddhism
- School: Theravada
- Dharma names: Mahāsīlavaṃsa

Senior posting
- Based in: Ava, Myanmar

Shin Mahāsīlavaṃsa (Burmese: ရှင်မဟာ သီလဝံသ, variously transcribed Shin Maha Silavamsa, Shin Maha Thilawuntha or Rhaṅʻ Mahāsīlavaṃsa) was a Theravadan Buddhist monk and a classical Burmese poet who lived in 15th century Ava Kingdom (now modern-day Myanmar).

He is famous for his pyo poetry and he is considered one of the greatest poets of pre-colonial Burma, in particular his masterpieces, Paramidawkhan Pyo (ပါရမီတော်ခန်းပျို့) and Sodaungkhan Pyo (ဆိုတောင်းခန်းပျို့), which are considered ideal models of the medieval literary style. While the primary focus of Mahāsīlavaṃsa's compositions was dhamma (Buddhist teachings), he also composed the earliest extant Burmese chronicle, Yazawingyaw. His contemporary literati rival was Shin Raṭṭhasāra.

== Personal life ==
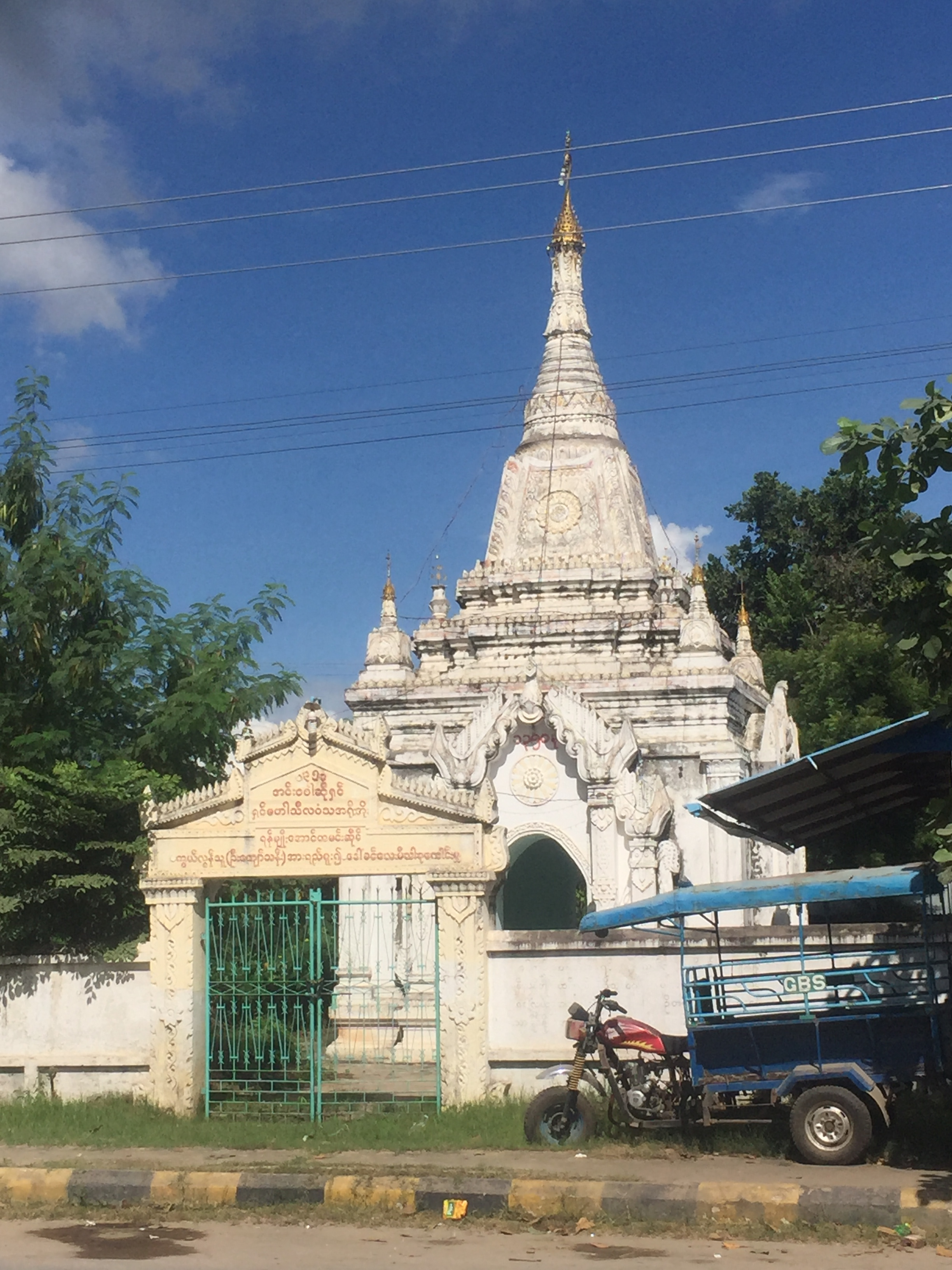
The remains of Shin Mahasilavamsa are housed at a reliquary tomb near the Hsinmyashin Pagoda in Sagaing.

Mahāsīlavaṃsa was born Maung Nyo in Myolulin village (north of Taungdwingyi on a Friday in 1453, to U Kyi and Daw Dwe.

He studied Buddhist scriptures and literature at the Yadana Beikman Monastery under the tutelage of the Natmilin Sayadaw (Shin Sīlācārabhidhaja). While it is not known when he became a novice monk, his gift for poetry was recognized from the age of 7. When he was 20, he became a monk under Shin Sīlācārabhidhaja. At the age of 38, he wrote his masterpiece, Paramitawkhan Pyo, which garnered recognition from throughout the kingdom. At the age of 40, he moved to Ava; King Minkhaung II of Ava subsequently donated the Yadana Beikman Golden Monastery at Sagaing as his residence.

== Works ==
Paramidawkhan Pyo is one of the greatest compositions of Burmese literature. Throughout this literary career, he composed numerous epics, stone inscriptions, and poetic verses including:

1. Record of the Golden Palace Title (ရွှေနန်းဘွဲ့မော်ကွန်း)
2. Htupayon Pagoda stone inscription (ထူပါရုံကျောက်စာ)
3. Yadana Beikman Monastery stone inscription (ရတနာဗိမာန်ကျောင်းကျောက်စာ)
4. Mitthilā Lake (Shisha Lake) songs (သျှိသျှားကန်တော် (မိတ္ထိလာကန်တော်) ဘွဲ့များ)
5. Pāramīdawkhan Pyo (ပါရမီတော်ခန်းပျို့)
6. Sutaungkhan Pyo (ဆုတောင်းခန်းပျို့)
7. Nanphwin Linka (နန်းဖွင့်လင်္ကာ)
8. Buddhuppatti Pyo (ဗုဒ္ဓုပ္ပတ္တိပျို့)
9. Rājavasatīkhan Linka (ရာဇဝသတီခန်းလင်္ကာ)
10. Record of the Inaugural Memorandum (တန်တားဦးတည်မော်ကွန်း)
11. Taungdwinla Pyo (တောင်တွင်းလာပျို့)
12. Saṃvegakhan Pyo (သံဝေဂခန်းပျို့)
13. Dhammapāla Pyo (ဓမ္မပါလပျို့)
14. Pārāyanavatthu (ပါရာယနဝတ္ထု)
15. Yazawingyaw (ရာဇဝင်ကျော်)
16. Mahārahanīti (မဟာရဟနီတိ)
17. Hsonmasa Linka (ဆုံးမစာလင်္ကာ)
18. Treatise on Buddhālaṅkāra (ဗုဒ္ဓါလင်္ကာရကျမ်း)
19. Nettipāḷidaw (နေတ္တိပါဠိတော်)
20. Nettihāra Akauk (နေတ္တိဟာရအကောက်)
