= Shin Raṭṭhasāra =

- ရှင်မဟာရဋ္ဌသာရ

Personal life
- Born: Maung Mauk (မောင်မောက်); 1468 Ava
- Died: 1529 (aged 60–61)
- Other name: Shin Maha Rahtathara

Religious life
- Religion: Buddhism
- School: Theravada
- Dharma names: Raṭṭhasāra

Senior posting
- Based in: Ava, Myanmar

Shin Raṭṭhasāra (Burmese: ရှင်မဟာရဋ္ဌသာရ; 1468–1529 (1530) was a Buddhist monk and prominent classical poet during the Ava Kingdom, known for his pyo poetry. His 1523 Kogan Pyo (ကိုးခန့်ပျို့) based on the Hatthipāla Jātaka, is among the most widely known pyo in modern-day Myanmar, and is taught in Burmese schools. His Buridat Pyo (ဘူရိဒတ်ပျို့; based on the Bhūridatta Jātaka) is also considered an exemplar of the medieval literary style, is considered a masterpiece of Burmese classical poetry. Raṭṭhasāra also composed metrical versions of other Jataka tales, including the Saṃvarajātaka, besides a number of other poems.

Despite his poetic contributions, Burmese chroniclers excluded him from the succession of elders (thera), because he not only wrote verse, but also recited and instructed pupils in the art of recitation, which was considered a transgression of the Vinaya, specifically the rules governing singing and dancing.

== Background ==
Raṭṭhasāra was born on 1468 in Ava Kingdom and growing up in royal palace of Ava. Descended from royal lineage, Raṭṭhasāra was the son of Dhammapāla, a minister, a nephew of Queen Shin Sawbu; his mother was the great-granddaughter of Thado Minbya, the founder of the Kingdom of Ava.

He taught astrology, poetry and Pali under a Buddhist monk, Varacakkapāla (ဝရစက္ကပါလထေရ်) and Thiho (Sri Lanka) Sayadaw (သီဟိုဠ်ရောက်ဆရာတော်). He began writing poems at the age of 12. At 16, he wrote Buridat Pyo (ဘူရိဒတ်ပျို့). His writer rival is Shin Maha Silavamsa (ရှင်မဟာသီလဝံသ).

A prolific writer, he wrote many pyo, mawgun (မော်ကွန်း) and other types of poems during his lifetime. His last work was Thanwara Pyo (သံဝရပျို့), based on the Saṃvarajātaka. Raṭṭhasāra died in 1529 at the age of 61.

== Works ==
Raṭṭhasāra was a prolific writer, composing at least 17 works throughout his lifetime, including:

1. Catudhammasāra Pyo (စတုဓမ္မသာရပျို့)
2. Gambhīsāra Pyo (ဂမ္ဘီသာရပျို့)
3. Bhūridat Zatpaung Pyo (ဘူရိဒတ်ဇာတ်ပေါင်းပျို့)
4. Bhūridhāt Linkagyi (ဘူရိဓာတ်လင်္ကာကြီး) first pyo (at the age of 16)
5. Saṃvara Pyo (သံဝရပျို့) last pyo (final)
6. Pondaungnaing Mawgun (ပုံတောင်နိုင်မော်ကွန်း)
7. Record of the Establishment of Ratanāpūra City (ရတနာပူရမြို့တည်မော်ကွန်း)
8. Mitthilā Lake Bwe Mawgun (မိတ္ထိလာကန်တော်ဘွဲ့မော်ကွန်း)
9. Record of the Dada-u Mingala Zedi (တန်တားဦးတည်မော်ကွန်း)
10. Yeyitet Mawgun (ရဲရည်တက်မော်ကွန်း)
11. Yadu Kabyamya Taungtetun Yadu (ရတုကဗျာများ တောင့်တဲတွန့်ရတု)
12. Wutyonkyaung bwe Mawgun (ဝတ်ရုံကျောင်းဘွဲ့မော်ကွန်း)
13. Hsommasa Linka (ဆုမ္မစာလင်္ကာ)
14. Letthittaungta (လက်သစ်တောင်တာဆုမ္မစာ)
15. Rājavasasatī Khanpaikson Yadu (ရာဇဝသသတီခဏ်းပိုက်စုံရတု)
16. Shweset Tawthwa Tawla (ရွှေစက်တော်သွားတော်လား)
17. Homily to Minkhaung II (ဒုတိယမင်းခေါင်ထံသွင်းမေတ္တာစာ)

== See also ==
- Burmese literature
- Pyo
