= Pyo =

Burmese form of poetry

Pyo (Burmese: ပျို့) is a Burmese form of poetry and was a major Burmese verse form from the 1600s to 1700s. The earliest surviving poetic literature found in the Burmese language dates from between 1450 and 1550, and is largely in the form of pyo.

== Format ==
Pyo follows classical Burmese verse, employing lines of four syllables with rhymes "climbing" from the end towards the beginning of successive lines. An entire pyo work may be divided into 200 to 300 verses, with an average of 30 to 35 four-syllable lines each. Poets employed many devices to overcome the four-syllable requirements, including use of repetition and rhyme.

The pyo is generally written in a combination of two styles; parts of the poem are written in a plainspoken style and other passages are written in a more ornate and complex style, which weave in metaphors, similes, and allusions.

== Subjects ==
The majority of pyo narrate episodes from the Buddha's life or adapt the Buddha's birth stories (Jātaka), while a minority document historical events or Buddhist principles and philosophy.

== Notable composers and works ==
Pyo were largely composed by Buddhist monks who worked in service of Burmese court. However, according to extant evidence, laypersons also began composing pyo from the 1570s onward.

Shin Raṭṭhasāra's 1523 Kogan Pyo (ကိုးခန့်ပျို့) based on the Hatthipāla Jātaka, is among the most widely known pyo in modern-day Myanmar, and is taught in Burmese schools. Shin Maha Silavamsa, wrote two pyo based on Buddha's previous rebirth as Sumedha Buddha, while Shin Aggasamadhi wrote three pyo based on the Nemi Jātaka. Shin Silavamsa's Hsudaungkhan Pyo (ဆုတောင်းခန့်ပျို့; based on the Sumedhapandita Jātaka) and Shin Raṭṭhasāra's Buridat Pyo (ဘူရိဒတ်ပျို့; based on the Bhūridatta Jātaka) are considered exemplars of the medieval literary style, and are treated as masterpieces of Burmese classical poetry.

The First Nawade was the first layperson to compose pyo in the 1570s, basing his Manohari Pyo (မနောဟရီပျို့) on one of the Paññāsa Jātakas. All lay pyo poets had significant studies at monastic colleges. Padethayaza expanded the repertoire of subjects used in pyo, composing poems based on Hindu tales and historical events, such as the arrival of Thai envoys at the Burmese court in 1746 in the Yodaya Thanyauk Pyo.

== See also ==
- Burmese literature
