= Nawade =

Nawade (Burmese: နဝဒေး; also spelt Nawaday) is a title given by the Burmese kings to the poets laureate of ancient Burma. Whereas there were at least five court poets who were given the title of Nawade only two are frequently discussed in academic circles.

== First Nawade ==
The first Nawade (1498–1588), known as Nawadegyi as well as the Prome Nawade, was a warrior and tutored the brother-in-law of the Lord of Prome. According to one traditional telling, Nawadegyi was the son of Princess Narapati Medaw's guardian. Nawadegyi served multiple kings, including Sithu Kyawhtin and Bayinnaung (the latter of whom conferred the title upon him). He often wrote poetry that exalted the royal family, including missing Manawhari Pyo (1579) which concerns the Thudanu Prince, as well as more than three hundred yadus. He was a nonagenarian at the time of his death.

== Second Nawade ==
The second Nawade, Dutiya (1756–1840), also known as Wetmasut Nawade after the town he frequented or Mawsun Nawade due to the fact that he wrote at least fifteen mawgun in his lifetime. Three of them pertain to Burmese conquests, including Ar-than-naing Mawgun and Rakhine Naing Mawgun on the conquests of Assam and Rakhine respectively, as well as the missing Dawei Naing Mawgun on the takeover of Dawei; he also wrote Tayok Than Yuak Mawgun (1821), which details the arrival of a group of Chinese officials to Burma. When the manuscript of Letwe Nawrahta's Yodaya Naing Mawgun was first catalogued, the poem was misattributed to the second Nawade, and this was not rectified until decades later.

== Influence ==
The first Ayeyarwady River bridge at Pyay-Sinde Road in Pyay, which was commissioned into service by the ruling tatmadaw in 1997, was named the Nawade Bridge.
