= Yadu (poetry) =

Form of poetry

The yadu (Burmese: ရတု, Burmese pronunciation: [jədṵ]; also spelt ya-du and yatu) is a Burmese form of poetry which consists of up to three stanzas of five lines. The first four lines of a stanza have four syllables each, but the fifth line can have 5, 7, 9, or 11 syllables. A yadu should contain a reference to a season.

The form uses climbing rhyme. The rhyme is required on the fourth, third, and second syllables of both the first three lines and the last three lines. The end of the last two lines also rhyme.

e.g.:

---A
--A-
-A-B
--BC
-B--C
