= Min Mya Hnit =

Min Mya Hnit မင်းမြနှစ်

Duchess of Twinthin
- Reign: c. 1440 – 1440s?
- Predecessor: ?
- Successor: Shwe Einthe
- Born: c. mid-to-late 1420s (Note: (Yazawin Thit Vol. 1 2012: 272) and (Hmannan Vol. 2 2003: 61): Her parents were married in May 1426.); Ava (Inwa)
- Died: 1440s ?
- Spouse: Thinkhaya of Twinthin
- House: Mohnyin
- Father: Minye Kyawswa I of Ava
- Mother: Min Hla Nyet of Ava
- Religion: Theravada Buddhism

Min Mya Hnit (Burmese: မင်းမြနှစ်, pronounced [mɪ́ɰ̃ mja̰ n̥ɪʔ]) was the only child of King Minye Kyawswa I and Queen Min Hla Nyet of Ava. She married her first cousin Thinkhaya of Twinthin during her father's reign (1439–c. 1442), and died during the early reign of her uncle King Narapati I of Ava (r. 1442–1468). Her husband later became known as Gov. Thihapate II of Pakhan.

== Ancestry ==
The following is her ancestry as given in the Hmannan Yazawin chronicle. Her parents were double cousins.

Ancestry of Princess Mya Hnit

8. Saw Diga of Mye-Ne
4. Mohnyin Thado
9. Saw Pale of Nyaungyan
2. Minye Kyawswa I of Ava
10. Thihapate II of Taungdwin
5. Shin Myat Hla of Ava
11. daughter of Thettawshay of Myinsaing
1. Mya Hnit
12. (=10) Thihapate II of Taungdwin
6. Thiri Zeya Thura of Pakhan
13. (=11) daughter of Thettawshay of Myinsaing
3. Min Hla Nyet of Ava
14. (=8) Saw Diga of Mye-Ne
7. Shin Myat Hla of Pakhan
15. (=9) Saw Pale of Nyaungyan

== Bibliography ==
- Maha Sithu (2012) [1798]. Myint Swe; Kyaw Win; Thein Hlaing (eds.). Yazawin Thit (in Burmese). Vol. 1–3 (2nd printing ed.). Yangon: Ya-Pyei Publishing.
- Royal Historical Commission of Burma (2003) [1832]. Hmannan Yazawin (in Burmese). Vol. 1–3. Yangon: Ministry of Information, Myanmar.
