= Thiri Zeya Thura of Taungdwin =

Thiri Zeya Thura သီရိဇေယျသူရ

Governor of Taungdwin
- Reign: 1441 – 1472/73 (or later)
- Predecessor: Thihapate III of Taungdwin as King of Taungdwin
- Successor: Min Sit-Tha of Taungdwin
- Monarch: Minye Kyawswa I of Ava (1441–1442); Narapati I of Ava (1442–1468); Thihathura of Ava (r. 1468–1480); Minkhaung II?

Governor of Toungoo
- Reign: 1459 – 1466
- Predecessor: Minye Kyawhtin of Toungoo as King of Toungoo
- Successor: Letya Zala Thingyan
- Monarch: Narapati I of Ava (1459–1466)

Sawbwa of Kale
- Reign: 1439 – 1450/51
- Predecessor: unnamed
- Successor: Minye Kyawswa I of Kale
- Monarch: Minye Kyawswa I of Ava (1439–1442); Narapati I of Ava (1442–1450/51)

Governor of Pyinzi
- Reign: 1434–1442
- Predecessor: Thihapate
- Successor: ?
- Monarch: Mohnyin Thado (1429–1439); Minye Kyawswa I of Ava (1439–1442)
- Born: late 1410s ?
- Died: 1480s? Taungdwin?
- Spouse: Saw Pyei Chantha unnamed wife or wives
- Issue: Min Sit-Tha of Taungdwin; Shwe Myat Mu; Taungdwin Minthami
- Father: Thiri Zeya Thura of Pakhan
- Mother: Shin Myat Hla of Pakhan

Thiri Zeya Thura (Burmese: သီရိဇေယျသူရ, pronounced [θìɹḭ zèja̰ θùɹa̰]; also spelled Thiri Zeyathura) was a 15th-century Burmese royal who served as a vassal ruler under several kings of Ava. A nephew of both King Mohnyin Thado and Queen Shin Myat Hla of Ava, he was governor of Taungdwin from 1441 to the 1470s or later, and held key governorships, notably at Toungoo (Taungoo) and Kale (Kalay).

He was also the father of Queen Taungdwin Minthami of Ava (r. 1502–1527).

== Early life ==
He was born to a minor noble family of Thiri Zeya Thura the Elder and Shin Myat Hla in the central region of Ava Kingdom. Probably born in the late 1410s, (Note: Since his first marriage and governorship came in early 1434 per (Yazawin Thit Vol. 1 2012: 278), he was probably born in the late 1410s or even 1420.) he became a prominent member of the ruling dynasty in May 1426 when his maternal elder uncle Thado successfully seized the Ava throne. He was also a nephew of Queen Shin Myat Hla of Ava, Thado's chief queen consort. The familial ties were further cemented when his older sister Min Hla Nyet was wedded to Thado's eldest son and the new crown prince, Minye Kyawswa at the coronation ceremony of Thado. Later in August 1426, his parents were appointed governor and duchess of Pakhan by the king. (Note: Some chronicles likely mistakenly say Thiri Zeya Thura the Younger, as opposed to his father Thiri Zeya Thura the Elder, was given Pakhan in 1426. (Maha Yazawin Vol. 2 2006: 63) says King Thado gave Pakhan to his nephew Thiri Zeya Thura (i.e. the Younger). (Yazawin Thit Vol. 1 2012: 274) corrects it, saying Thado gave Pakhan to his brother-in-law Thiri Zeya Thura (i.e. the Elder), and (Yazawin Thit Vol. 1 2012: 278) adds that Thiri Zeya Thura the Younger got his title of Thiri Zeya Thura only in 795 ME (1433/34). (Hmannan Vol. 2 2003: 64, 70) accepts Yazawin Thit's corrections that Pakhan was given to Thiri Zeya Thura the Elder in 1426, and that Thiri Zeya Thura the Younger got his title only in 1433/34. But Hmannan for whatever reason also says the Younger was given Pakhan Gyi, which is problematic since Pakhan Gyi typically refers to Pakhan (as opposed to nearby Pakhan Nge).)

His first governorship came in early 1434. The king appointed his nephew governor of Pyinzi with the title of Thiri Zeya Thura, his father's title. He was also wedded to Princess Saw Pyei Chantha, a daughter of King Thihathu of Ava (r. 1421–1425) and Queen Saw Min Hla.

== Career ==
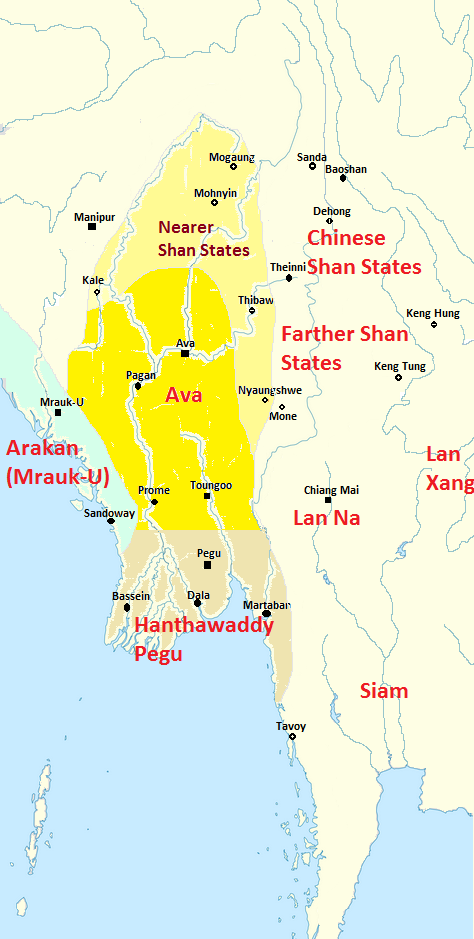
Political map of Myanmar c. 1450. The map in the first half of the century was similar except in Arakan which was disorganized until 1429. The nearer Shan states in light yellow, including Mohnyin, Mogaung, Thibaw (Hsipaw/Onbaung) and Nyaungshwe (Yawnghwe), were sometime tributaries of Ava during the first half of the 15th century.

Thiri Zeya Thura the Younger spent the next four decades as a loyal vassal under several kings: his uncle Mohnyin Thado, his brothers-in-law and first cousins Minye Kyawswa I and Narapati I, and his nephew Thihathura of Ava. (Note: See (Hmannan Vol. 2 2003: 70) for his service under King Mohnyin Thado; (Hmannan Vol. 2 2003: 78–79) for King Minye Kyawswa I; (Hmannan Vol. 2 2003: 84) for King Narapati I; and (Hmannan Vol. 2 2003: 101) for King Thihathura.)

=== Northern frontier years ===
His role expanded greatly in the reign of his brother-in-law King Minye Kyawswa I of Ava (r. 1439–1442). In 1439, he was appointed sawbwa of Kale (Kalay) by the new king. The appointment came after a successful expedition by Gov. Thihapate of Pakhan that brought back the northern Shan states of Mohnyin and Kale into Ava's fold. Thiri Zeya Thura's job was to assist Thihapate, who too was transferred to Mohnyin, which directly bordered Mong Mao and Ming China, in holding Ava's forward bases in the north. In 1441, the king added Taungdwin, a former vassal state that the king's armies had just captured, to Thiri Zeya Thura's portfolio. It was a symbolic gesture by the king as Taungdwin was the longtime fief of Thiri Zeya Thura's paternal grandfather Thihapate II of Taungdwin.

His most well-known accomplishment came during his stay at Kale. In the dry season of 1441–1442, he served as the deputy of Thihapate in the successful siege of Mogaung that captured Tho Ngan Bwa, the supreme sawbwa (lord) of Mong Mao. Because King Minye Kyawswa I had died, the duo rushed back to the capital Ava (Inwa), arriving just on the eve of the coronation ceremony of King Narapati, and formally presented the defeated sawbwa Tho Ngan Bwa to the new king at the ceremony the next day, on 6 April 1442. (Note: (Yazawin Thit Vol. 1 2012: 286): Friday, 12th waning of Kason 804 ME = Friday, 6 April 1442)

Thiri Zeya Thura remained posted at Kale for the next eight plus years. (Note: (Maha Yazawin Vol. 2 2006: 77) says King Narapati after his accession in 1442 transferred Thiri Zeya Thura to Taungdwin, and appointed Minye Kyawswa I of Kale as the new sawbwa of Kale. (Yazawin Thit Vol. 1 2012: 290) corrects it, giving 812 ME (1450/51 CE) as the date. (Hmannan Vol. 2 2003: 84) follows the Maha Yazawin's account. However, it is less probable that Minye Kyawswa I of Kale would be posted at Kale in 1442 as he was still too young to have been sawbwa of a frontier state like Kale. Per (Maha Yazawin Vol. 2 2006: 56) and (Hmannan Vol. 2 2003: 54), Minye Kyawswa I of Kale's mother Saw Min Phyu was born only in 1414/15. Furthermore, per (Hmannan Vol. 2 2003: 83), Minye Kyawswa I of Kale was a younger child. Therefore even if Saw Min Phyu got married in her early teens, a younger child of hers would have probably been born in the early 1430s at the earliest. In 1442, he might not have even reached teenage.) In 1450/51, he was permanently transferred to Taungdwin after the death of Thihapate of Mohnyin, and the subsequent rebellion of Thihapate's eldest son Min Uti. The king decided to install his son-in-law, who was given the title of Minye Kyawswa, at Kale.

=== Taungdwin years ===
At Taungdwin, Thiri Zeya Thura would rule the small vassal state, 240 km south of Ava, for the next 20+ years. He proved to be a loyal vassal. He fully supported King Narapati in 1452 when nearby Toungoo (Taungoo) was seized by Prince Minye Kyawhtin. For his steadfast loyalty, he was appointed governor of Toungoo after Minye Kyawhtin's death in 1459, alongside his current fief of Taungdwin. He ruled both states until 1466 when he was removed from the Toungoo post. (Note: (Maha Yazawin Vol. 2 2006: 84) mistakenly says King Narapati removed Thiri Zeya Thura from both Toungoo and Taungdwin posts in 1466 because the king had lost trust in him. (Yazawin Thit Vol. 1 2012: 294, 299) rejects it, stating that he retained the Taungdwin post at least until 1472/73, citing a contemporary mawgun inscription. (Hmannan Vol. 2 2003: 101) accepts Yazawin Thit's correction.) According to a contemporary mawgun inscription, he and his chief wife Saw Pyei Chantha remained in charge of Taungdwin in 1472/73 when they pledged their loyalty to King Thihathura of Ava. (Although he may have been removed from Toungoo because the king no longer trusted him, it was his successor at Toungoo Letya Zala Thingyan that raised a rebellion against Ava.)

Thiri Zeya Thura was probably still alive in the 1480s, if not later. He had a daughter who was likely born in the late 1470s or the early 1480s since she became a queen consort of King Narapati II in February 1502. (Note: His daughter may have been born as late as the 1480s. (Yazawin Thit Vol. 1 2012: 310, 320) and (Hmannan Vol. 2 2003: 121): Daughter of Thiri Zeya Thura of Taungdwin became a queen consort of King Narapati II in Tabaung 863 ME (6 February 1502 to 7 March 1502). Per (Zata 1960: 47, 78), King Narapati II was born in September 1476.) Chronicles do not say when his rule ended at Taungdwin; they only say that Thiri Zeya Thura's son Min Sit-Tha was confirmed as governor of Taungdwin by the new king Narapati II of Ava in February 1502.

== Family ==
His first wife and chief consort was Princess Saw Pyei Chantha, whom he married in 1434. He had at least three children, two of whom got married in 1502.

Child	Notes
Min Sit-Tha of Taungdwin	Governor of Taungdwin (r. by 1502–1524/25); (Note: Tabaung 863 ME (6 February 1502–7 March 1502); 886 ME (1524/25)) married Min Myat Hla, daughter of King Minkhaung II and Queen Tazaung Mibaya, in 1502
Min Myat Mu	Younger (full) brother of Sit-Tha. Married to a daughter of Mingyi Nyo of Toungoo.
Taungdwin Minthami	Queen consort of Ava (r. 1502–1527)

== Ancestry ==
He was a nephew of both King Mohnyin Thado and Queen Shin Myat Hla of Ava, and a grandson of Gov. Thihapate II of Taungdwin.

Ancestry of Thiri Zeya Thura the Younger

8. Thray Sithu
4. Thihapate II of Taungdwin
9. unnamed
2. Thiri Zeya Thura the Elder
10. Thettawshay of Myinsaing
5. unnamed
11. unnamed
1. Thiri Zeya Thura the Younger
12. Min Pale of Paukmyaing
6. Saw Diga of Mye-Ne
13. Shwe Einthe of Paukmyaing
3. Shin Myat Hla of Pakhan
14. Saw Mun Nit of Nyaungyan
7. Saw Pale of Nyaungyan
15. unnamed

== Bibliography ==
- Aung-Thwin, Michael A. (2017). Myanmar in the Fifteenth Century. Honolulu: University of Hawai'i Press. ISBN 978-0-8248-6783-6.
- Kala, U (2006) [1724]. Maha Yazawin (in Burmese). Vol. 1–3 (4th printing ed.). Yangon: Ya-Pyei Publishing.
- Maha Sithu (2012) [1798]. Myint Swe; Kyaw Win; Thein Hlaing (eds.). Yazawin Thit (in Burmese). Vol. 1–3 (2nd printing ed.). Yangon: Ya-Pyei Publishing.
- Royal Historians of Burma (1960) [c. 1680]. U Hla Tin (Hla Thamein) (ed.). Zatadawbon Yazawin. Historical Research Directorate of the Union of Burma.
- Royal Historical Commission of Burma (2003) [1832]. Hmannan Yazawin (in Burmese). Vol. 1–3. Yangon: Ministry of Information, Myanmar.

Thiri Zeya Thura of Taungdwin Ava Kingdom Born: c. late 1410s Died: c. 1480s?
Royal titles
Preceded by Thihapate III of Taungdwin as King of Taungdwin	Governor of Taungdwin; 1441–1472/73 or later	Succeeded by Min Sit-Tha of Taungdwin
Preceded by Minye Kyawhtin of Toungoo as King of Toungoo	Governor of Toungoo; 1459–1466	Succeeded by Letya Zala Thingyan
Preceded by unnamed	Sawbwa of Kale; 1439–1450/51	Succeeded by Minye Kyawswa I of Kale
Preceded by Thihapate	Governor of Pyinzi; 1434–1442	Succeeded by ?
