= Minye Kyawswa I of Ava =

Minye Kyawswa I of Ava; ဆင်ဖြူရှင် မင်းရဲကျော်စွာကြီး

King of Ava
- Reign: April 1439 – c. January 1442
- Predecessor: Mohnyin Thado
- Successor: Narapati I
- Chief Minister: Yazathingyan
- Born: c. 11 December 1410; c. Thursday, 2nd waning of Pyatho 772 ME; Mohnyin; Ava Kingdom
- Died: c. early January 1442 (aged 31); by Tabodwe 803 ME; Ava (Inwa); Ava Kingdom
- Consort: Min Hla Nyet
- Issue: Min Mya Hnit
- House: Mohnyin
- Father: Mohnyin Thado
- Mother: Shin Myat Hla
- Religion: Theravada Buddhism

Minye Kyawswa I of Ava (Burmese: မင်းရဲကျော်စွာ, pronounced [mɪ́ɰ̃jɛ́ tɕɔ̀zwà]; also known as Hsinbyushin Minye Kyawswa Gyi (ဆင်ဖြူရှင် မင်းရဲကျော်စွာကြီး, lit. 'Lord of the White Elephant Minye Kyawswa the Elder'; c. December 1410–c. January 1442) was king of Ava (Inwa) from 1439 to c. 1442. In less than three years of rule, the second king from the royal house of Mohnyin (မိုးညှင်းဆက်) had recovered four major former vassal states of Ava: his native Mohnyin, Kale (Kalay), Taungdwin and Toungoo (Taungoo), and was about to capture a fifth, Mogaung, which was achieved shortly after his death. Despite the successes farther afield, his attempt to capture the closer districts of Pinle and Yamethin failed.

His reign marked Ava's first attempt to forcefully reclaim the former vassal states that it had lost since the mid-1420s. As king, Minye Kyawswa implemented a more aggressive policy against the rebel states, which he had advocated for since his days as crown prince of Ava (1426–1439) but could not get his father King Mohnyin Thado to prioritize. He launched a major military campaign in every dry season of his short reign. Ava's campaigns in the kingdom's north benefited greatly from Ming China's campaigns against the powerful Shan-speaking state of Mong Mao. King Minye Kyawswa I's expansionist policy would be continued by his successor and brother King Narapati I under whose leadership Ava would reach its height of power in the early second half of the 15th century.

== Early life ==
The future king was the eldest child of a minor noble family of Shin Myat Hla and Thado (from present-day Mandalay Region, Myanmar). He was born in Mohnyin (present-day Kachin State) c. December 1410, (Note: The c. December 1410 date is based on the king's horoscope as given in (Zata 1960: 76) but using the year (772 ME) given in (Yazawin Thit Vol. 1 2012: 284) and (Hmannan Vol. 2 2003: 81). A Thursday in the 10th month of 772 ME = (27 November 4 December, 11 December 18 December 1410). In all, various chronicles provide different dates for his date of birth. The 17th century Zatadawbon Yazawin chronicle alone contains two different dates in two different sections: (Zata 1906: 46): one Thursday in the 4th month [First Waso] of 763 ME (i.e. 16 June 23 June, 30 June or 7 July 1401); and (Zata 1906: 76): Born on a Thursday in the 10th month of 763 ME (1401/02) (8, 15, 22, 29 December 1401). The Maha Yazawin chronicle (Maha Yazawin Vol. 2 2006: 73–74) gives c. 1401 as the birth date. The Yazawin Thit chronicle (Yazawin Thit Vol. 1 2012: 284) corrects the prior chronicles' date of birth for the king by citing the frescoes at the Golden Monastery (Shwe Kyaung) in Pagan donated by Minye Kyawswa's mother, which says that his parents were married in 771 ME (30 March 1409 – 29 March 1410), and he was born in 772 ME (30 March 1410 – 29 March 1411). The Hmannan Yazawin (Hmannan Vol. 2 2003: 81) accepts Yazawin Thit's correction.) about eight months after his parents had relocated to the northern Shan-speaking frontier state, following his father's appointment as sawbwa (lord governor) of the state by King Minkhaung I of Ava. (Note: (Yazawin Thit Vol. 1 2012: 236) and (Hmannan Vol. 2 2003: 81): Thado's appointment to Mohnyin and marriage to Myat Hla took place in 771 ME (30 March 1409 – 29 March 1410), according to the fresco writings at the Shwe Kyaung (Golden Monastery) in Pagan, donated by Queen Myat Hla herself. Since the appointment and the marriage came after an unsuccessful five-month campaign in 771 ME, and since dry season campaigns typically began after the Buddhist Lent (which ended on 23 September 1409), the events most probably took place in March.) He grew up in Mohnyin with his younger brother, and two younger sisters. (Note: Chronicles do not mention the personal names of King Minye Kyawswa I and his brother King Narapati I. The Hmannan Yazawin (Hmannan Vol. 2 2003: 62) does mention the personal names of their sisters as Shin Hla Myat and Shin Hla Htut.) Unlike his brother, who spent time at the capital Ava (Inwa) as a page of King Thihathu from 1421 to 1425, chronicles have no record of Minye Kyawswa spending his early years outside of Mohnyin. He apparently remained alongside his father to his early teens when he was appointed sawbwa of Moshwe, a small district of Mohnyin.

== Thado's rebellion ==
His small town life ended in February 1426. (Note: (Yazawin Thit Vol. 1 2012: 271) and (Hmannan Vol. 2 2003: 59): Tabaung 787 ME = 6 February 1426 to 7 March 1426) That month, his father formally revolted against King Min Nyo's regime, and the 15-year-old sawbwa and his 12-year-old brother, sawbwa of Wuntho, became active participants in the rebellion. The brothers' first assignment was notable in that they achieved their first battlefield victory by not strictly following their father's orders. They had sailed down the Irrawaddy with a flotilla of war boats to Thissein, Ava's forward garrison with 2000 troops and 50 war boats, while Thado marched with his army towards the garrison. Though they were to wait for their father, whose army was still ten marches away, the brothers decided to launch a surprise attack from the port-side of the fort. Ava forces were not expecting an attack, and withdrew in disarray. Despite the success, their father, a former co-commander-in-chief of the Ava military, would not put his eager but inexperienced sons in the vanguard again for the rest of the campaign. The brothers' next assignment came only in May as Thado's forces closed in on Ava: the brothers dutifully marched to the east of Ava (Inwa) to block a possible escape route of King Nyo but saw no action. Thado entered the royal capital unopposed on 16 May 1426. (Note: (Yazawin Thit Vol. 1 2012: 272): Thursday, the 10th waxing of Nayon 788 ME = Wednesday, 15 May 1426. The editors of the chronicle (Yazawin Thit Vol. 1 2012: 272, footnote 3) accept Thursday, 16 May 1426.)

On 20 May 1426, Thado formally ascended the throne, and made his eldest son einshei min (အိမ်ရှေ့မင်း, lit. "Lord of the Front Place", heir apparent) with the title of Minye Kyawswa, and gave Salin, Sagu, and Legaing districts (all three in modern Minbu District) in fief. The new crown prince also married his double first cousin Min Hla Nyet, daughter of his paternal aunt Shin Myat Hla and his maternal uncle Thiri Zeya Thura.

== Crown prince years ==
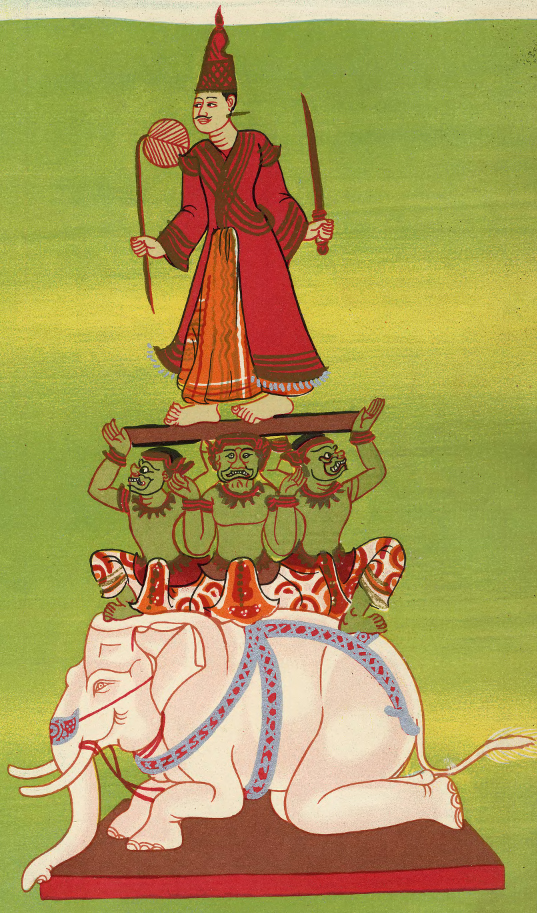
A representation of the Mahagiri nat, to which Thado's soldiers sacrificed horses and cattle to honor their lord's accession to the Ava throne in 1426

Throughout his father's 13-year reign, Minye Kyawswa would prove a loyal deputy albeit with policy differences. The royal chronicles portray the crown prince as far more distrustful of the vassal rulers, and more eager to use force against the rebel states. But he failed to significantly alter the policies of Thado, who never made a sustained effort to establish his authority outside the core zone. The first such episode took place just a few months into Thado's reign when Minye Kyawswa urged Thado to arrest the governors of Toungoo (Taungoo) and Taungdwin, who purportedly had come to Ava to pledge their allegiance. The son argued that the governors—Thinkhaya III of Toungoo and Thihapate III of Taungdwin—had probably come to assess Ava's military strength but the father disagreed. The son's suspicion soon proved correct: the two governors revolted right after they got back to their respective regions.

It was not an isolated incident. The crown prince could not get his father to take a harder stance against Prince Minye Kyawhtin either. Although the second-most senior prince of the previous dynasty had never renounced his claim to the Ava throne, and by 1427 had occupied Pinle, only 70 km away from the capital, Thado was unwilling to send the full force against the prince, grandson of his deceased lord, King Minkhaung. Indeed, Thado had even freed the prince back in August 1426, only to see him revolt again just a few months later. Even when Thado finally authorized Minye Kyawswa to lead an expedition to Pinle in late 1428, he gave his son just a small force (1500 troops, 300 cavalry, and 20 elephants). The crown prince dutifully went on to laid siege to the fortified town but the outcome was never in doubt; he had to withdraw after three months, in early 1429.

Minye Kyawswa would not get another chance for the next four years. By then, his father had essentially abandoned the reunification project; turned to religion; and began devoting much of the kingdom's resources on building Buddhist stupas and monasteries. (In all, Thado would build a total of 27 new pagodas, temples and monasteries, including one at Rajagaha (ရာဇဂြိုဟ်) in India during his reign. According to a preliminary calculation by Michael Aung-Thwin, the 27 projects may have cost the royal treasury, 1.62 million kyats (ticals) of silver, "not including the usual endowments of people and land for their subsequent upkeep.") In 1431, Thado formally ceded the southernmost districts of Tharrawaddy and Paungde to King Binnya Ran I of Hanthawaddy Pegu without putting up a fight. In late 1433, Minye Kyawswa managed to get his father's permission to lead an expedition to Pinle and other southeastern states in revolt. Although his army was larger (5000 infantry, 300 cavalry and 120 elephants), it still was not enough to take any rebel-held town. He again came back empty handed in early 1434.

The failed campaign was the last one Thado would authorize. Over the next five years, the king continued to focus on his pagoda building spree, and little else. Even when Pegu openly seized Toungoo in 1436, his response was not to launch a punitive campaign but to order a recalibration of the Burmese calendar, over the objection of the court.

== Reign ==
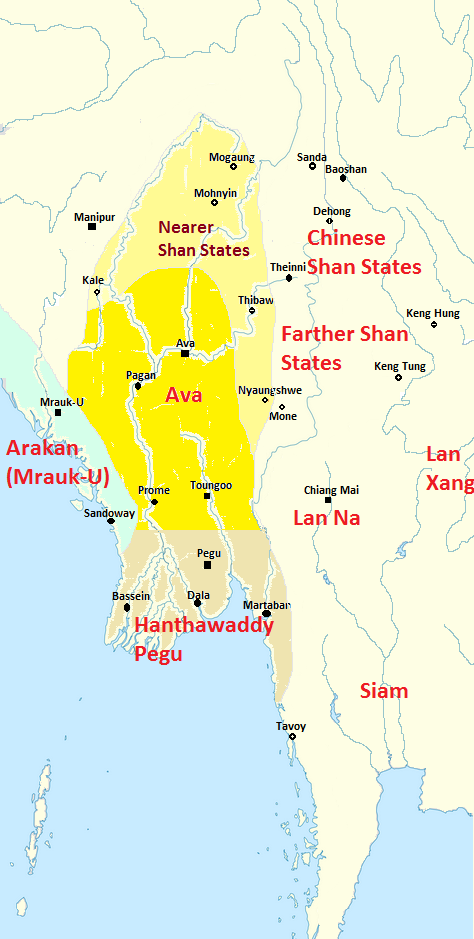
Political map of Myanmar c. 1450. The map in the first half of the century was similar except in Arakan which was disorganized until 1429. The nearer Shan states in light yellow, including Mohnyin, Mogaung, Thibaw (Hsipaw/Onbaung) and Nyaungshwe (Yawnghwe), were sometime tributaries of Ava during the first half of the 15th century.

Thado died in April 1439, and Minye Kyawswa succeeded without incident. (Note: (Aung-Thwin 2017: 88–89, 323, citing (SMK Vol. 5 1998: 4)): The main chronicles and a contemporary inscription (SMK Vol. 5 1998: 4) say King Minye Kyawswa ascended the throne in 801 ME (30 March 1439 to 29 March 1440), an (Arthein [Asvini] Year). The chronicles (Maha Yazawin Vol. 2 2006: 61, 72) and (Hmannan Vol. 2 2003: 61, 76) say King Thado died as his reign was about to turn 13, having come to power in the waxing half of Nayon of 788 ME. Thus, the latest Thado could have died would be the last waxing day of Nayon 801 ME (26 April 1439), and Minye Kyawswa would have been king by 26 April 1439.) The two key vassals who could challenge the new 28-year-old king—his brother Prince Thihathu of Prome and his uncle Gov. Nawrahta I of Myedu—both acknowledged him. Even with their support, the realm he inherited was a rump polity that extended only along the narrow north-south axis of the Irrawaddy river between Myedu in the north to Prome in the south.

The following major former vassal states remained out of Ava's orbit:

Region	Ruler	Notes
Pinle	Minye Kyawhtin	Backed by Le Than Bwa of Onbaung
Onbaung	Le Than Bwa	In revolt and supporter of Minye Kyawhtin since 1426
Toungoo (Taungoo)	Saw Oo II of Toungoo	In revolt 1426–1436 / vassal of Hanthawaddy 1436–1441
Taungdwin	Thihapate III of Taungdwin	In revolt since 1426
Yat Sauk Naung Mun	unnamed	Occupies Yamethin in 1433
Kale (Kalay)	unnamed	
Mohnyin	unnamed	Vassal of Mogaung since 1427
Mogaung	Tho Ngan Bwa of Mogaung (Si Renfa in Chinese)	In revolt since 1427

The new king immediately instituted a policy to reclaim the rebel states. (Chronicles attribute this urgency to the two competing prophecies given by the court astrologers at his accession. The story goes that all but one predicted that the new king would reign three years while a lone astrologer predicted that the new king would conquer three (unspecified) countries; Minye Kyawswa is said to have preferred the lone astrologer's prophecy. He may have believed in the larger group's prophecy as well. He as king would not go to the front in any of the campaigns during his reign although he as crown prince did so in at least three campaigns.) At any rate, Minye Kyawswa shifted much of the resources of his narrow realm, which nonetheless did include the most productive granaries of the kingdom, Mu valley, Minbu and a large portion of Kyaukse, away from his father's expensive pagoda building projects, (Note: (Yazawin Thit Vol. 1 2012: 284) and (Hmannan Vol. 2 2003: 80): He built no pagodas or stupas but three monasteries during his reign.) and ordered the court to prepare for war in the upcoming dry season.

Ming campaigns in Yunnan–Burma border, 1436–1449

His first target was not his nemesis Minye Kyawhtin at Pinle, just 70 km away from Ava, but his birthplace Mohnyin by the Chinese border, some 400 km away. It was entirely an opportunistic decision. Mohnyin's overlord Mong Mao had been under attack by the Chinese since 1436, and Mohnyin itself was in a fight with Kale (Kalay), another former vassal state of Ava. In c. November 1439, Minye Kyawswa ordered his brother-in-law Gov. Thihapate I of Pakhan to march to Mohnyin with a sizeable army (9000 men, 500 cavalry, 30 elephants). The show of force worked. The sawbwa of Mohnyin submitted without a fight, and the sawbwa of Kale also submitted soon after. Minye Kyawswa replaced the sawbwas with his brothers-in-law Thihapate (at Mohnyin) and Thiri Zeya Thura (at Kale/Kalay) to hold his new forward bases. But he decided to hold off an attack on Mogaung itself—as Tho Ngan Bwa by then had survived the first round of Chinese attacks (1436–1439). For his part, Tho Ngan Bwa did not contest Ava's takeover of Mohnyin as he remained preoccupied with the Chinese, (who would return in 1441).

In 1440, Minye Kyawswa launched a campaign to conquer the southeastern states. With the northern front still in a stalemate, he could allocate only a smaller army (7000 men, 400 cavalry, 20 elephants) to the operation, which was led by his uncle Nawrahta I of Myedu. The results were decidedly mixed. The small army still could not take heavily fortified Pinle and Yamethin. Indeed, its capture of the next two states Taungdwin and Toungoo may have been helped by the decision of the rulers of those regions to engage the army in open battle. (The Toungoo army fell apart after their leader Min Saw Oo was killed atop his war elephant by Yazathingyan, one of the commanders of the Ava army.) Gaining Toungoo in particular was a major achievement. The southeastern state was never part of his father's realm, and had been controlled by the southern Hanthawaddy kingdom since 1436. He appointed Tarabya governor of Toungoo. He also gave Taungdwin to the portfolio of his brother-in-law Thiri Zeya Thura, the sawbwa of Kale.

In the next dry season, Minye Kyawswa reopened the northern front, ordering an attack on Mogaung. (The Ming records say that the Chinese, who had resumed their attacks against Mong Mao since June 1441, had asked Ava and Hsenwi to join in on the attack, offering the Luchuan district (present-day Longchuan County, Yunnan, China) as reward for capturing Si Renfa (Tho Ngan Bwa). However, Ava apparently was not acting because of the Chinese offer as it did not exchange Luchuan for Tho Ngan Bwa. The noncompliance led the Ming court in 1445 to threaten an attack on Ava itself.) His two brothers in-law, the sawbwas of Mohnyin and Kale, went on to lay siege to Mogaung, about 90 km northeast of Mohnyin. During the siege, the king died in Ava in December 1441/January 1442, (probably in early January 1442). (Note: He likely died in January 1442. The chronicles Maha Yazawin (Maha Yazawin Vol. 2 2006: 74) and Hmannan Yazawin (Hmannan Vol. 2 2003: 80) say King Minye Kyawswa died in Tabodwe 803 ME (12 December 1441 to 10 January 1442); however, the two chronicles' narrative on the selection of the next king by the court suggests Minye Kyawswa most probably died in late Tabodwe (early January 1442). The Yazawin Thit chronicle (Yazawin Thit Vol. 1 2012: 283) does not mention Tabodwe or any specific month at all; its subsequent narrative (Yazawin Thit Vol. 1 2012: 284–285) says after a brief search by the court, the next king, Narapati, arrived at Ava at the beginning of Late Kason 803 ME (11 March 1442), suggesting a more recent death, perhaps even later than January 1442, of King Minye Kyawswa.) The 31-year-old king had reigned less than three years.

== Aftermath ==
Minye Kyawswa did not leave a male heir. In fact, he had only one daughter, Min Mya Hnit. Although his younger brother Viceroy Thihathu of Prome was next in line of succession, the court initially preferred his brother-in-law Thihapate of Mohnyin. (According to Aung-Thwin, the ministers may have preferred Thihapate because they wished to wield greater power at court, knowing that Thihathu was likely to be a stronger leader than Thihapate.) The ministers rushed a messenger on horseback to the outskirts of Mogaung, 500 km north of Ava, where Thihapate was besieging the town, to invite him to be king. But he refused, saying that he was neither a son or younger brother of the king, and that the court should give the throne to the rightful heir, Thihathu. Only then did the court send a royal flotilla down the Irrawaddy to Prome (Pyay) to invite Thihathu to Ava. Thihathu accepted, and arrived at Ava on 11 March 1442. (Note: (Yazawin Thit Vol. 2 2012: 284): Beginning of the month of Late Kason, 803 ME = Sunday, 11 March 1442) He formally ascended to the throne with the reign name of Narapati on 6 April 1442. (Note: (Yazawin Thit Vol. 1 2012: 285, and footnote 2): Date of coronation (Friday, 12th waning of Kason 804 ME) per a contemporary inscription at the Htupayon Pagoda founded by the king himself. The editors of the 1798 Yazawin Thit chronicle (Yazawin Thit Vol. 1 2012: 285, footnote 1) translated the date as 6 May 1442 which was a Sunday, not Friday as per the inscription. The reason for this error seems to be that the editors treated the previous year 803 ME as a great leap year, which added a leap day and a leap month. If 803 ME was a regular year, then the inscription date (Friday, 12th waning of Kason 804 ME) correctly translates to Friday, 6 April 1442. The 1724 Maha Yazawin Chronicle (Maha Yazawin Vol. 2 2006: 75) says that Narapati's coronation was on Friday, 1st waning of Kason 804 ME [sic], which is a copying error for the following reasons: (1) 804 ME did not begin until the 5th waning of Late Kason; and (2) 1st waning of Kason 803 ME did not fall on a Friday but on Monday, 26 March 1442. (The editors of the chronicle (Maha Yazawin Vol. 2 2006: 75, footnote 1) erroneously translated "1st waning of Kason 804 ME" to 25 April 1442, which was a Wednesday.) The 1832 Hmannan Yazawin chronicle (Hmannan Vol. 2 2003: 82) follows the Maha Yazawin's date of 1st waning of Kason, 804 ME instead of Yazawin Thit's inscription-supported date.) Meanwhile, Thihapate had captured Mogaung, and presented Tho Ngan Bwa to the new king at the coronation ceremony.

== Legacy ==
Minye Kyawswa's legacy was his policy to restore Ava's former borders. In a marked change from his father's policy, Minye Kyawswa used Ava's still considerable resources to expand his authority outside the core narrow zone he inherited. His goals of reestablishing a "miniature Pagan" were reflected in a 1440 inscription from his reign, which according to Aung-Thwin "used, perhaps for the first time, amyo-tha [အမျိုးသား] ("sons of the race, or countrymen") as a reference to the people in the Kingdom of Ava. Although it was likely a reference mainly to the dominant Burmese speakers of the kingdom, the context also suggests that it included many who were not originally born Burmese speakers, but belonged to other ethnolinguistic groups, who had become "citizens" of the kingdom." In all, in his short reign of less than three years, Minye Kyawswa successfully had brought four key vassal states (Mohnyin, Kale, Taungdwin and Toungoo) back into the fold, and begun the eventual capture of Mogaung, which was achieved shortly after his death. His expansionist policy would be continued by his brother under whose reign Ava reached its "apogee".

== Administration ==
Minye Kyawswa kept his father's court led by Chief Minister Yazathingyan. He also kept his uncle Nawrahta at Myedu and his younger brother Thihathu at Prome (Pyay). While he used his uncle to lead a major campaign, he did not involve his younger brother in any of the campaigns or any major decisions. Instead, he installed his brothers-in-law Thihapate of Mohnyin and Thiri Zeya Thura in three of the four newly conquered states (Mohnyin, Kale, Taungdwin), and appointed them to lead the 1441–1442 Mogaung campaign. He apparently trusted Thihapate as his only child Min Mya Hnit was married to Thihapate's son Thinkhaya. At any rate, the distance between the brothers may have led to the court initially selecting Thihapate to be the next king after Minye Kyawswa's death.

Vassal state	Region	Ruler (duration in office)	Notes
Pagan (Bagan)	Core	Einda Thiri (c. 1434–?)	His youngest sister Saw Hla Htut
Pakhan	Core	Thihapate I and Shin Hla Myat (1429–1450/51)	Shin Hla Myat, his older younger sister, and her husband Thihapate were co-governors.
Pyinzi	Core	Thiri Zeya Thura the younger (1434–1442?)	His first cousin and brother-in-law
Sagaing	Core	Yazathingyan (1413–1450)	
Singu	Central-North	Baya Gamani (1412–1426, 1427–c. 1450)	Older brother of Yazathingyan
Myedu	Central-North	Nawrahta I (1429–?)	His paternal younger uncle, and Commandant of the Northern Cavalry
Prome (Pyay)	South	Thihathu III of Prome (1429–1442)	His younger brother
Toungoo (Taungoo)	Southeast	Tarabya (1441–1446)	
Taungdwin	Southeast	Thiri Zeya Thura the younger (1441–1470s)	Still governor of Taungdwin in 1471/72; Also governor of Toungoo (1459–1466);
Kale (Kalay)	Northwest	Thiri Zeya Thura the younger (1439–1450/51)	
Mohnyin	North	Thihapate (1439–1450/51)	

== List of military campaigns ==
The following is a list of military campaigns in which he went to the front per the royal chronicles. The campaigns which he ordered as king but did not go to the front are not included.

Military Campaigns of Minye Kyawswa I
Campaign	Period	Troops commanded	Summary
Revolt against King Nyo	1426	unknown	He and his brother captured the Thissein garrison. The brothers led a regiment that blocked the eastern route out of Ava.
Battle of Pakhan against Tarabya II of Pakhan	1426	1 regiment	Commanded one regiment (1000 infantry, 150 cavalry, 10 elephants)
Siege of Pinle	1428–1429	5 battalions	Led a force of 1500 infantry, 300 cavalry, and 20 elephants against the fortified town of Pinle held by Prince Minye Kyawhtin
Pinle, Yamethin, Taungdwin	1433–1434	5 regiments	Led an army of 5000 infantry, 300 cavalry and 20 elephants. Failed to take a single rebel town.

== Historiography ==
The main chronicles all say that the king was an able leader who possessed good martial abilities but was also short-tempered. But with regard to the key events of his life, various chronicles provide different information. In particular, the earlier chronicles the Zatadawbon Yazawin and Maha Yazawin erroneously say the king was born in 1401; the date was corrected to 1410/1411 in the later chronicles.

Source	Birth–Death	Age	Reign	Length of reign	Reference
Zatadawbon Yazawin (List of Kings of Ava Section)	c. 30 June 1401 – 1441/42; Thursday born	39 (40th year)	1438/39 – 1441/42	3	(Note: (Zata 1906: 46): Born on a Thursday in the 4th month [First Waso] of 763 ME (i.e. 16 June 23 June, 30 June or 7 July 1401). Became king in 800 ME (1438/39) in his 37th year (at age 36). Reigned 3 years. Died in 803 ME in his 40th year (at age 39).)
Zatadawbon Yazawin (Horoscopes Section)	c. 15 December 1401 [sic] – 1441/42; Thursday born	39 (40th year)	1438 – 1441/42	3	(Note: (Zata 1906: 76): Born on a Thursday in the 10th month of 763 ME (1401/02) [sic] with 22 nekkhats (8, 15, 22, 29 December 1401).)
Maha Yazawin	c. 1401 [sic] – December 1441/January 1442; Thursday born	39 (40th year)	1439 – December 1441/January 1442	3	(Note: (Maha Yazawin Vol. 2 2006: 73–74): Thursday born; came to power in 801 ME (1439/40) in his 37th year (at age 36); reigned 3 years; and died in Tabodwe 803 ME (12 December 1441 to 10 January 1442) in his 40th year (age 39).)
Yazawin Thit	1410/11 – 1441/42; Thursday born	29 (30th year) [sic]	1439 – 1441/42 [early 1442 (late 803 ME) death implied]	3	(Note: (Yazawin Thit Vol. 1 2012: 282–284): He was born on a Thursday in 772 ME (30 March 1410 – 29 March 1411), and died in 803 ME in his 30th year [sic!] (at age 29). The age at death is a typographical error as the king must have been at least 31 (772–803 ME).)
Hmannan Yazawin	1410/11 – December 1441/January 1442; Thursday born	31 (32nd year)	1439 – December 1441/January 1442	3	(Note: Hmannan largely follows Yazawin Thit, except for correcting the mathematical error of Yazawin Thit's age at death. (Hmannan Vol. 2 2003: 78–81): He was born in 772 ME (30 March 1410 – 29 March 1411); came to power in 801 ME (1439/40) in his 29th year (at age 28); reigned 3 years; and died in Tabodwe 803 ME (12 December 1441 to 10 January 1442) in his 32nd year (age 31).)

== Bibliography ==
- Aung-Thwin, Michael A. (2017). Myanmar in the Fifteenth Century. Honolulu: University of Hawai'i Press. ISBN 978-0-8248-6783-6.
- Fernquest, Jon (Autumn 2006). "Crucible of War: Burma and the Ming in the Tai Frontier Zone (1382–1454)" (PDF). SOAS Bulletin of Burma Research. 4 (2).
- Harvey, G. E. (1925). History of Burma: From the Earliest Times to 10 March 1824. London: Frank Cass & Co. Ltd.
- Kala, U (2006) [1724]. Maha Yazawin (in Burmese). Vol. 1–3 (4th printing ed.). Yangon: Ya-Pyei Publishing.
- Maha Sithu (2012) [1798]. Myint Swe; Kyaw Win; Thein Hlaing (eds.). Yazawin Thit (in Burmese). Vol. 1–3 (2nd printing ed.). Yangon: Ya-Pyei Publishing.
- Nyein Maung, ed. (1972–1998). Shay-haung Myanma Kyauksa-mya [Ancient Burmese Stone Inscriptions] (in Burmese). Vol. 1–5. Yangon: Archaeological Department, Ministry of Culture.
- Royal Historians of Burma (1960) [c. 1680]. U Hla Tin (Hla Thamein) (ed.). Zatadawbon Yazawin. Historical Research Directorate of the Union of Burma.
- Royal Historical Commission of Burma (2003) [1832]. Hmannan Yazawin (in Burmese). Vol. 1–3. Yangon: Ministry of Information, Myanmar.
- Sein Lwin Lay, Kahtika U (2006) [1968]. Mintaya Shwe Hti and Bayinnaung: Ketumadi Taungoo Yazawin (in Burmese) (2nd printing ed.). Yangon: Yan Aung Sarpay.

Minye Kyawswa I of Ava Ava Kingdom Born: c. 11 December 1410 Died: January 1442
Regnal titles
Preceded by Mohnyin Thado	King of Ava by 26 April 1439 – January 1442	Succeeded by Narapati
Royal titles
Preceded by Min Hla	Heir to the Burmese Throne; 20 May 1426 – c. 26 April 1439	Succeeded by Narapati I
