= Shin Myat Hla =

Shin Myat Hla may refer to:

- Shin Myat Hla of Prome, early 14th century Duchess of Thayet
- Shin Myat Hla of Ava, Queen of Ava (r. 1426–39)
- Shin Myat Hla of Pakhan, Duchess of Pakhan (r. 1426–34)
