= Tarabya I of Pakhan =

Late 14th and early 15th century Burmese governor and commander

Tarabya I of Pakhan ပုခန်း တရဖျားကြီး

Governor of Pagan
- Reign: 1413 – c. 1433
- Predecessor: Uzana Thinkhaya
- Successor: Einda Thiri
- Monarch: Minkhaung I (1413–1421); Thihathu (1421–1425); Min Nyo (1425–1426); Mohnyin Thado (1426–c. 1433)

Governor of Pakhan
- Reign: by 1390 – 1413
- Predecessor: Saw Me
- Successor: Tarabya II
- Monarch: Swa Saw Ke (1390–1400); Tarabya of Ava (1400); Minkhaung I (1400–1413)
- Born: Unknown; Ava Kingdom
- Died: c. 1433; Pagan (Bagan)? Ava Kingdom
- Issue: Saw Min Hla; Tarabya of Toungoo

Tarabya I of Pakhan (Burmese: တရဖျား, pronounced [təɹəbjá]; also known as Tarabya the Elder of Pakhan, ပုခန်း တရဖျားကြီး, (Note: See (Yazawin Thit Vol. 1 2012: 291) (Hmannan Vol. 1 2003: 471)) [pəkʰáɴ təɹəbjá dʑí]; c. 1360s – c. 1433) was a Burmese governor and military commander during the early Ava period. Between 1390 and 1413, Tarabya served as governor of Pakhan and as an officer in the Ava military in several campaigns, mostly against the southern Hanthawaddy forces in the Forty Years' War. In 1413, he lost his military command and was transferred to become governor of Pagan (Bagan), the ancient royal capital. He appeared to have ended his career there c. early 1430s.

Tarabya is remembered in Burmese history for his progeny. He was the father of Queen Saw Min Hla of Ava and her younger brother Viceroy Tarabya of Toungoo; the maternal grandfather of the self-proclaimed king Minye Kyawhtin of Toungoo and King Min Hla of Ava; and the paternal grandfather of Viceroy Minkhaung I of Toungoo. He is the earliest known patrilineal ancestor of King Bayinnaung of the Toungoo dynasty. All the kings of the dynasty—Mingyi Nyo, Tabinshwehti and Bayinnaung onwards—claimed descent from Tarabya.

== Brief ==
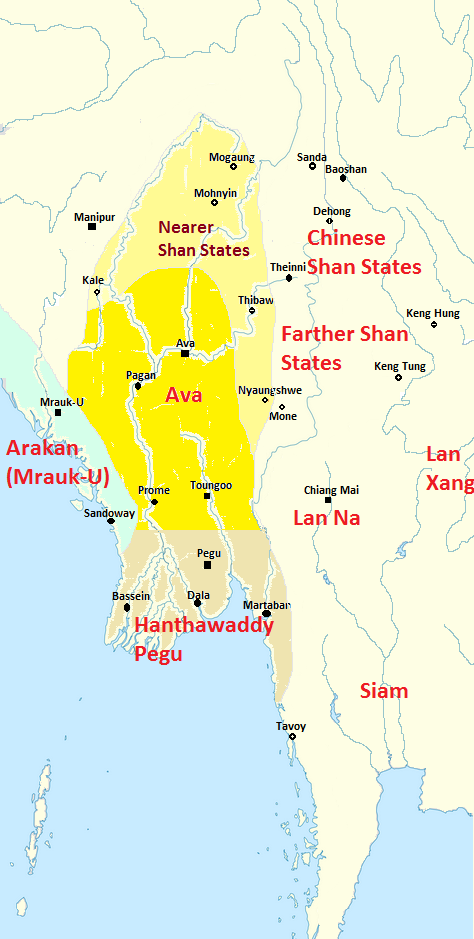
Political map of Burma in the 15th century

The first explicitly dated mention of him in the royal chronicles is in 1390–1391 (Note: Chronicles are ambiguous. The chronicle Maha Yazawin (Maha Yazawin Vol. 1 2006: 281) provides a list of the key vassals under the section "King Swa Saw Ke's Realm"; Tarabya of Pakhan is included on the list. Because the section comes right after Swa's accession, it can be construed that the list was at the time of or soon after the accession—i.e. 1367 or 1368. However, not all of the named vassals could have been governor soon after the accession since at least one of them, Sithu Thanbawa of the Five Irrigated Districts, would have been too young to have been governor, or may not yet have been born, in 1367/68. The Yazawin Thit chronicle (Yazawin Thit Vol. 1 2012: 206) points out that King Swa's daughter Minkhaung Medaw was the mother of Sithu Thanbawa and Thray Sithu of Myinsaing, who flourished in the early 15th century; and removes the list altogether. Nonetheless, the Hmannan Yazawin (Hmannan Vol. 1 2003: 405) retains the list from the Maha Yazawin. At any rate, the first mention of Tarabya of Pakhan and an explicit date is in 750 ME (1390/91).) when he commanded an Ava regiment that fought in the battle of Gu-Htut in the Forty Years' War under the command of King Swa Saw Ke (r. 1367–1400). He was then already governor of Pakhan (modern Pakokku District in central Myanmar), and would hold the post until 1413. Outside of his reappointment to the post in 1402 by King Minkhaung I (r. 1400–1421), chronicles say nothing about his record as governor of the vassal state.

In all, only his military record can be gleaned from the chronicles, and it was not particularly distinguished. Though a regimental commander, Tarabya appeared to have gained a minor advisory role in the Ava high command, especially after his daughter Saw Min Hla wedded Crown Prince Minye Kyawswa in 1406. In 1408, he and Gov. Sithu of Yamethin were a voice of caution, urging the king not to invade Hanthawaddy right before the start of the rainy season. But the king ignored their advice, and proceeded to invade the southern kingdom. The invasion ended in total disarray three months later; Tarabya was one of the commanders in the rearguard army that failed to secure an orderly withdrawal.

His last campaign was in 1412–1413 when he failed two assignments. First, early in the campaign c. November 1412, his regiment failed to capture a key Hanthawaddy stockade, defended by Commander Smin Upakaung, blocking the route to the besieged city of Prome (Pyay). Later, in May 1413, (Note: (Yazawin Thit Vol. 1 2012: 245): Nayon 775 ME (30 April to 28 May 1413)) Tarabya failed to defend the key port city of Syriam (Thanlyin), which had been captured by Crown Prince Minye Kyawswa with great difficulty just a few weeks earlier. With Minye Kyawswa pressing ahead towards the Hanthawaddy capital Pegu (Bago), Tarabya became "careless", and was unprepared when a Hanthawaddy flotilla launched a counterattack on the port. The loss of Syriam frustrated the Ava crown prince's plans to occupy the Irrawaddy delta over the rainy season (June–October), (Note: (Yazawin Thit Vol. 1 2012: 244) and (Hmannan Vol. 2 2003: 15–16): Minkhaung had ordered to pull back before the rainy season but Minye Kyawswa ignored his father's order, and planned to occupy the delta in the rainy season.) and forced him to pull back to Prome.

Back at Ava (Inwa), Tarabya, the father-in-law of the crown prince, escaped harsh punishment. King Minkhaung transferred Tarabya to become governor of Pagan, and appointed his youngest son Prince Minye Kyawhtin to take over Pakhan. His posting at Pagan (Bagan), the ancient capital, may have been a face-saving measure, as Tarabya never went to the front again as an active commander. (He did briefly return to Pakhan in 1426 with the army of Mohnyin Thado against Prince Minye Kyawhtin but not as a commander.)

Tarabya lived out his years at Pagan. He survived the unrest and civil war that ensued after the twin assassinations of his son-in-law King Thihathu (r. 1421–1425), and grandson King Min Hla (r. 1425) in 1425. He supported Thado, who overthrew King Min Nyo in 1426. It is unclear when he died. Chronicle reporting suggests that he likely died sometime during Thado's reign (1426–1439), and probably before early 1434. The Yazawin Thit chronicle states that Princess Einda Thiri succeeded the governorship at Pagan (at an unspecified date during the king's reign), meaning that Tarabya was no longer governor of Pagan sometime between 1426 and 1439, either because he had died or was replaced. Furthermore, he had apparently died by early 1434 since the king appointed Tarabya's son governor of Amyint with the title of Tarabya c. February 1434. (Note: (Yazawin Thit Vol. 1 2012: 278) (Hmannan Vol. 2 2003: 69–70): King Thado made the appointment after a series of failed campaigns to Pinle, Yamethin and Taungdwin; the campaigns began in the dry season of 1433–1434, and lasted 3 months.)

== Family ==
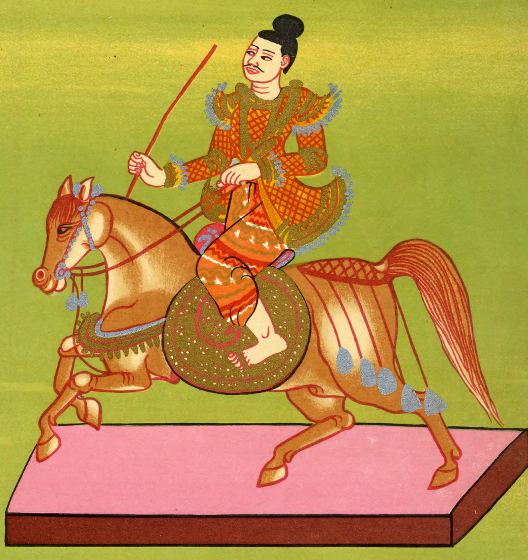
Minye Kyawswa (1391–1415)

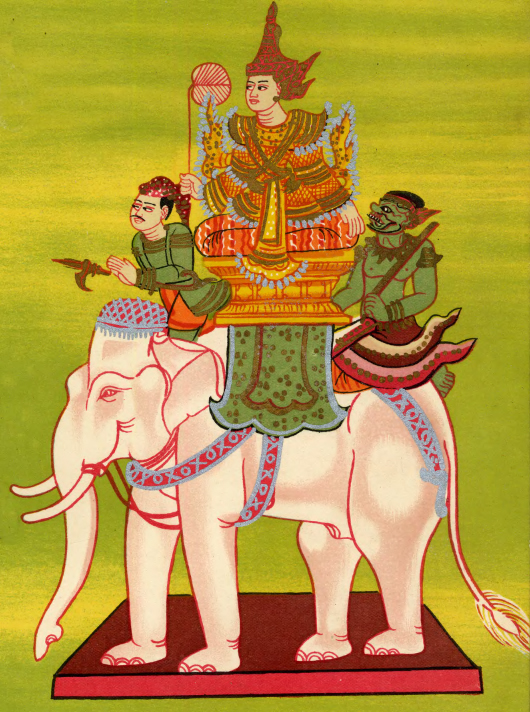
Minye Thihathu (1394–1425)

Tarabya's sons in law. His daughter Saw Min Hla was married to Minye Kyawswa from 1406 to 1415 and to Thihathu from 1416 to 1425.

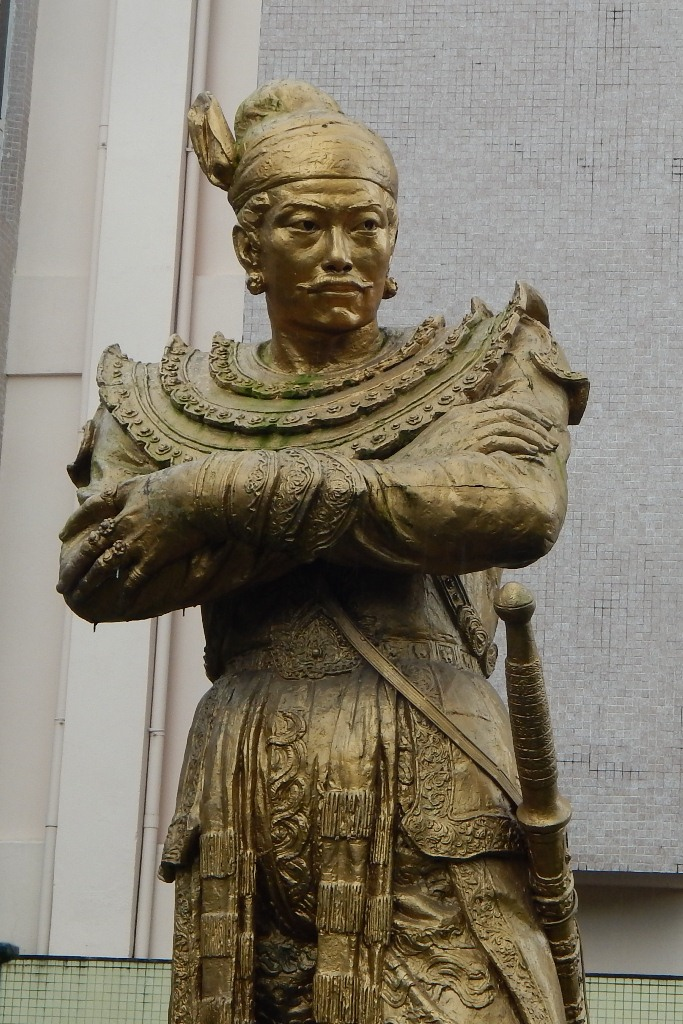
Statue of King Bayinnaung in front of the National Museum of Myanmar

Tarabya is remembered for his progeny. According to the chronicles, he had at least two children: Queen Saw Min Hla of Ava (r. 1421–1425) and her younger brother Viceroy Tarabya of Toungoo (r. 1440–1446). He was the maternal grandfather of the self-proclaimed king Minye Kyawhtin of Toungoo (r. 1452–1459) and King Min Hla of Ava (r. 1425) as well as the paternal grandfather of Viceroy Minkhaung I of Toungoo (r. 1446–1452).

Through Saw Min Hla, he was an ancestor of kings Mingyi Nyo and Tabinshwehti of the Toungoo Dynasty. Through Minkhaung I of Toungoo, the royal chronicles from the 18th century onwards trace the patrilineal ancestry of King Bayinnaung (r. 1550–1581) of the Toungoo Dynasty. According to the genealogy of the king first proclaimed in the chronicle Maha Yazawin in 1724, Tarabya is the earliest known patrilineal ancestor of Bayinnaung and all the subsequent kings of the dynasty. While Bayinnaung's maternal line traces back ultimately to the monarchs of Pagan (to the first millennium CE), the paternal line ends with Tarabya I of Pakhan in the 14th century. Given that his daughter was married to two crown princes and later became of the chief queen consort, and that he himself was made governor of the ancient royal capital of Pagan, Tarabya may likely have hailed from a not-too-distant branch of the royal family. Still, chronicles could not provide any information about Tarabya's ancestry. (Note: The Yazawin Thit chronicle (Yazawin Thit Vol. 1 2012: 209), citing the "Min Yadana" eigyin (a type of poetry) by Padethayaza, does include the ancestry of one Tarabya of Pakhan. As the eigyin poem is about King Minkhaung I and Queen Shin Mi-Nauk's family, the Tarabya of Pakhan in question refers to Prince Minye Kyawhtin (Tarabya II of Pakhan), not the Tarabya elder of Pakhan.)

Family tree of King Bayinnaung according to the Maha Yazawin chronicle

Tarabya I of Pakhan d. c. 1433	Minkhaung I of Ava; 1373–1421 r. 1400–1421	Shin Mi-Nauk of Mohnyin b. 1374	Thihathu of Pinya; 1265–1325 r. 1310–1325	Mi Saw U of Pagan
Tarabya of Toungoo d. 1446	Saw Min Hla	Minye Kyawswa; 1391–1415	Nawrahta of Kanni b. c. 1300s	Uzana I of Pinya; 1298–1356 r. 1325–1340	Kyawswa I of Pinya; 1299–1350 r. 1344–1350
Minkhaung I of Toungoo d. 1452	Thettawshay of Dabayin
Unnamed	Thray Ponnya
Kayenawaddy	Taungkha Min	Kywe Sit Min
Mingyi Swe c. 1490s–1549	Shin Myo Myat c. 1490s–1520s
Bayinnaung; 1516–1581 r. 1550–1581

== Military service ==
The following is a list of the military campaigns Tarabya I of Pakhan participated in as explicitly reported in the chronicles. Chronicles do include a "lord of Pakhan" in the order of battle lists for the first two campaigns of the Forty Years' War (1385–1386, and 1386–1387) but do not provide the name of the lord.

Campaign	Period	Troops commanded	Summary
Forty Years' War	1390−91	1 regiment (1000 troops)	Part of the 17,000-strong river-borne invasion force that attacked Gu-Htut.
Forty Years' War	1402	1 regiment	Part of the Ava army (5000 troops, 300 cavalry, 20 elephants) that tried to break the siege of Prome (Pyay) by the Hanthawaddy army. Initially driven back by Gen. Byat Za, and broke the siege only after Minkhaung arrived with 12,000 more men.
Forty Years' War	1406	1 regiment	Commanded a regiment of the Ava Army (10,000 men, 500 cavalry, 40 elephants) in the successful Arakan campaign; served under Prince Minye Kyawswa.
Forty Years' War	1408	1 regiment	Part of the disastrous invasion (with a force consisted of 22,000 men, 2000 cavalry, 80 elephants) that began at the outset of the rainy season. Also commanded a regiment in the rearguard army (8000 men, 800 cavalry, 20 elephants) in the retreat four months after.
Forty Years' War	1410–1411	1 regiment	Part of the first army (7000 troops, 600 cavalry, 40 elephants)
Hsenwi	1412	1 regiment	Part of the army (7000 troops, 300 cavalry, 40 elephants) that invaded Hswenwi
Forty Years' War	1412–13	1 regiment	His last campaign. In c. November 1412, failed to capture a key Hanthawaddy stockade blocking the route to the besieged city of Prome (Pyay). In May 1413, failed to defend the key port city of Syriam (Thanlyin).
Pakhan	1426	None?	Marched to his old fief Pakhan, then ruled by Tarabya Minye Kyawhtin, as part of the new king Mohnyin Thado's army.

== Bibliography ==
- Kala, U (2006) [1724]. Maha Yazawin (in Burmese). Vol. 1–3 (4th printing ed.). Yangon: Ya-Pyei Publishing.
- Maha Sithu (2012) [1798]. Kyaw Win; Thein Hlaing (eds.). Yazawin Thit (in Burmese). Vol. 1–3 (2nd ed.). Yangon: Ya-Pyei Publishing.
- Royal Historians of Burma (1960) [c. 1680]. U Hla Tin (Hla Thamein) (ed.). Zatadawbon Yazawin. Historical Research Directorate of the Union of Burma.
- Royal Historical Commission of Burma (2003) [1832]. Hmannan Yazawin (in Burmese). Vol. 1–3. Yangon: Ministry of Information, Myanmar.
- Sandamala Linkara, Ashin (1997–1999) [1931]. Rakhine Razawin Thit (in Burmese). Vol. 1–2. Yangon: Tetlan Sarpay.
- Thaw Kaung, U (2010). Aspects of Myanmar History and Culture. Yangon: Gangaw Myaing.

Tarabya I of Pakhan Ava Kingdom Born: c. ? Died: c. 1433
Royal titles
Preceded by Uzana Thinkhaya	Governor of Pagan; 1413–c. 1433	Succeeded by Einda Thiri
Preceded by Saw Me	Governor of Pakhan by 1390–1413	Succeeded by Tarabya II of Pakhan
