= Thiri Zeya Thura =

Thiri Zeya Thura was a Burmese royal title, and may refer to:

- Thiri Zeya Thura of Sagaing: Heir presumptive of Ava (r. 1400–1406); Governor of Sagaing (r. 1402–1407)
- Thiri Zeya Thura of Pakhan: Governor of Pakhan (r. 1426–1429)
- Thiri Zeya Thura of Taungdwin: Governor of Taungdwin (r. 1441–1470s); Governor of Toungoo (1459–1466)
- Maha Thiri Zeya Thura of Toungoo: King of Toungoo (r. 1510–1530); Governor of Toungoo (1485–1510)
