= Min Hla Nyet of Ava =

Min Hla Nyet မင်းလှညက်

Chief queen consort of Ava
- Tenure: April 1439 – c. January 1442
- Predecessor: Shin Myat Hla of Ava
- Successor: Atula Thiri Maha Yaza Dewi of Ava
- Born: c. 1410s ?
- Died: Unknown; Ava (Inwa)
- Spouse: Minye Kyawswa I of Ava
- Issue: Min Mya Hnit
- House: Mohnyin
- Father: Thiri Zeya Thura of Pakhan
- Mother: Shin Myat Hla of Pakhan
- Religion: Theravada Buddhism

Min Hla Nyet (Burmese: မင်းလှညက်, pronounced [mɪ́ɴ l̥a̰ ɲ̥ɛʔ]) was the chief queen consort of King Minye Kyawswa I of Ava from 1439 to c. 1442. The couple had one daughter, Min Mya Hnit.

== Ancestry ==
The following is her ancestry as given in the Hmannan Yazawin chronicle. Hla Nyet and her husband were double first cousins.

Ancestry of Queen Hla Nyet

8. Thihapate I of Taungdwin
4. Thihapate II of Taungdwin
9. Saw Pale of Pinya
2. Thiri Zeya Thura of Pakhan
10. Thettawshay of Myinsaing
5. Princess of Myinsaing
11. unnamed
1. Hla Nyet
12. Min Pale of Paukmyaing
6. Saw Diga of Mye-Ne
13. Shwe Einthe of Paukmyaing
3. Shin Myat Hla of Pakhan
14. Saw Mon Nit of Nyaungyan
7. Saw Pale of Nyaungyan
15. unnamed

== Bibliography ==
- Royal Historical Commission of Burma (2003) [1832]. Hmannan Yazawin (in Burmese). Vol. 1–3. Yangon: Ministry of Information, Myanmar.

Min Hla Nyet of Ava Ava Kingdom Born: 1410s Died: ?
Royal titles
| Preceded by Shin Myat Hla of Ava | Chief queen consort of Ava; April 1439 – c. January 1442 | Succeeded by Atula Thiri Maha Yaza Dewi of Ava |
