= Shin Myat Hla of Ava =

Shin Myat Hla; ရှင်မြတ်လှ

Chief queen consort of Ava
- Tenure: 16 May 1426 – c. April 1439
- Coronation: 20 May 1426
- Predecessor: Shin Bo-Me
- Successor: Min Hla Nyet

Duchess of Mohnyin
- Tenure: c. April 1410 – 16 May 1426
- Predecessor: vacant
- Successor: unknown

Queen consort of Ava
- Tenure: c. October 1409 – March 1410
- Born: c. April 1388 c. Kason 750 ME; Taungdwin; Ava Kingdom
- Died: Ava (Inwa); Ava Kingdom
- Spouse: Minkhaung I (m. 1409; div. 1410) Mohnyin Thado (m. 1410; died 1439)
- Issue: Minye Kyawswa I of Ava; Narapati I of Ava; Shin Hla Myat of Pakhan; Einda Thiri Saw Hla Htut of Pagan
- House: Mohnyin
- Father: Thihapate II of Taungdwin
- Religion: Theravada Buddhism

Shin Myat Hla (Burmese: ရှင်မြတ်လှ, pronounced [ʃɪ̀ɴ mjaʔ l̥a̰]; also known as Shin Mi-Myat or Me Myat Hla) was the chief queen consort of King Mohnyin Thado of Ava (now Burma) from 1426 to 1439. She was also a junior queen of King Minkhaung I of Ava for five months in 1409–10. She was the mother of kings Minye Kyawswa I and Narapati I of Ava. She was also an eight-times great-grandmother of King Alaungpaya of the Konbaung dynasty.

== Brief ==
Shin Myat Hla was descended from Pinya and Pagan royal lines. Her father Thihapate II was a grandson of King Thihathu of Ava, and her mother was a great-great-granddaughter of King Kyawswa of Pagan. She was born in early 1388. (Note: (Yazawin Thit Vol. 1 2012: 236): According to the inscription at the Pagan Shwe Kyaung (Golden Monastery) donated by the queen herself, she was 22 (in her 23rd year) when she was married to Thado who was 30 (31st year); and she was 50 (51st year) when her husband of 29 years Thado died at age 59 (60th year). Since they were married in c. March 1410 (at the end of the 1409–10 campaign) and Thado died in 1439, she was born c. April 1388.) She grew up in Taungdwin which her father had ruled since at least 1364. (Note: (Hmannan Vol. 1 2003: 398, 400): Her father declared himself king with the title of Thettawshay Thihapate when the Pinya Kingdom collapsed in 1364. He submitted to the new king, Thado Minbya, in the dry season of 1366–67, only after the latter had laid siege to Taungdwin. According to inscriptional evidence, Thihapate was still governor of Taungdwin in 1402 per (Hmannan Vol. 2 2003: 63).) She had at least one full younger brother, Thiri Zeya Thura.

Her cloistered upbringing changed drastically in 1409. She was married off to King Minkhaung I of Ava. (She was following in the footsteps of her niece Shin Bo-Me, who became a queen of Minkhaung in 1407.) But five months into the marriage, c. March 1410, the king gave her to Thado, then a commander in his army, as a reward for the commander's performance in then ongoing war with Pegu. Furthermore, the couple was sent off to Mohnyin, a rebellion-prone Shan state (in present-day Kachin State), where her new husband was appointed sawbwa ("lord governor"). Over the next 16 years, her husband came to be known as "Mohnyin Thado". The couple had four children (two sons and two daughters): Minye Kyawswa, Narapati, Shin Hla Myat, and Saw Hla Htut.

Myat Hla became queen of Ava again—this time as the chief queen, succeeding her niece Bo-Me—in 1426 when Mohnyin Thado seized the Ava throne. She remained the chief queen for the entire duration of Mohnyin's reign (1426–39). (Note: The obituary section of King Mohnyin in (Hmannan Vol. 2 2003: 75–77) states only her as the chief queen. Furthermore, she was still alive in 1438 per (Hmannan Vol. 2 2003: 75).)

Her two sons became kings of Ava. Her eldest child Minye Kyawswa reigned from 1439 to 1442 while her second child Narapati reigned from 1442 to 1468. In all, her descendants ruled Ava until 1527. King Alaungpaya, the founder of the Konbaung dynasty, was an 11th generation descendant of the queen.

== Ancestry ==
The following is her ancestry as given in the Yazawin Thit and Hmannan Yazawin chronicles. (Note: The chronicles cite contemporary frescoes at the Shwe Kyaung Monastery in Pagan (Bagan), donated by the queen herself to describe her ancestry.)

Ancestry of Queen Shin Myat Hla

8. Thray Sithu
4. Thihapate I of Taungdwin
9. unnamed
2. Thihapate II of Taungdwin
10. Thettawshay of Myinsaing
5. unnamed
22. Kyawswa I of Pinya
11. unnamed
23. Atula Sanda Dewi of Pinya
1. Myat Hla

== Bibliography ==
- Htin Aung, Maung (1967). A History of Burma. New York and London: Cambridge University Press.
- Kala, U (2006) [1724]. Maha Yazawin (in Burmese). Vol. 1–3 (4th printing ed.). Yangon: Ya-Pyei Publishing.
- Letwe Nawrahta and Twinthin Taikwun (c. 1770). Hla Thamein (ed.). Alaungpaya Ayedawbon (in Burmese) (1961 ed.). Ministry of Culture, Union of Burma.
- Maha Sithu (2012) [1798]. Myint Swe (1st ed.); Kyaw Win; Thein Hlaing (eds.). Yazawin Thit (in Burmese). Vol. 1–3 (2nd ed.). Yangon: Ya-Pyei Publishing.
- Royal Historical Commission of Burma (1832). Hmannan Yazawin (in Burmese). Vol. 1–3 (2003 ed.). Yangon: Ministry of Information, Myanmar.

Shin Myat Hla of Ava Ava Kingdom Born: 1388 Died: ?
Royal titles
Preceded by Shin Bo-Me	Chief queen consort of Ava; 16 May 1426 – April 1439	Succeeded by Min Hla Nyet
