= Shin Myat Hla of Pakhan =

Shin Myat Hla ရှင်မြတ်လှ

Duchess of Pakhan
- Tenure: August 1426 – c. August 1429
- Predecessor: Shin Saw Pu
- Successor: Shin Hla Myat of Pakhan
- Born: 1380s Nyaungyan? Ava Kingdom
- Died: ? Ava Kingdom
- Spouse: Thiri Zeya Thura of Pakhan
- Issue: Thihapate of Mohnyin? Min Hla Nyet of Ava; Thiri Zeya Thura of Taungdwin
- Father: Saw Diga of Mye-Ne
- Mother: Saw Pale of Nyaungyan
- Religion: Theravada Buddhism

Shin Myat Hla (Burmese: ရှင်မြတ်လှ, pronounced [ʃɪ̀ɴ mjaʔ l̥a̰]) was Duchess of Pakhan from 1426 to c. 1434. She was the only sister of King Mohnyin Thado (r. 1426–1439), and the mother of Queen Min Hla Nyet of Ava. She had the same name as her sister-in-law Queen Shin Myat Hla of Ava. (Note: (Maha Yazawin Vol. 2 2006: 61) gives the personal name of King Thado's only sister as Min Hla Myat. (Yazawin Thit Vol. 1 2012: 272) corrects the name as Shin Myat Hla, the same personal name as Thado's chief queen's. (Hmannan Vol. 2 2003: 63) accepts Yazawin Thit's correction.)

== Ancestry ==
Shin Myat Hla was descended from the Pinya and ultimately Pagan royal lines.

Ancestry of Shin Myat Hla

16. Min Pe Nge of Myittha
8. Yandathu of Lanbu
17. Khin Hpone
4. Min Pale of Paukmyaing
18. Uzana I of Pinya
9. Mway Medaw of Lanbu
19. Atula Maha Dhamma Dewi of Pinya
2. Saw Diga of Mye-Ne
20. Thihathu
10. (=26) Kyawswa I of Pinya
21. Mi Saw U
5. Shwe Einthe of Paukmyaing
22. Saw Hnit of Pagan
11. Atula Sanda Dewi of Pinya
23. unnamed
1. Myat Hla
24. Min Letya of Nyaungyan
12. Min Maha of Nyaungyan
6. Saw Mun Nit of Nyaungyan
26. (=10) Kyawswa I of Pinya
13. Saw Min Hla of Nyaungyan
27. Mway Medaw of Pinya
3. Saw Pale of Nyaungyan
7. unnamed

== Bibliography ==
- Kala, U (2006) [1724]. Maha Yazawin (in Burmese). Vol. 1–3 (4th printing ed.). Yangon: Ya-Pyei Publishing.
- Maha Sithu (2012) [1798]. Myint Swe; Kyaw Win; Thein Hlaing (eds.). Yazawin Thit (in Burmese). Vol. 1–3 (2nd printing ed.). Yangon: Ya-Pyei Publishing.
- Royal Historical Commission of Burma (1832). Hmannan Yazawin (in Burmese). Vol. 1–3 (2003 ed.). Yangon: Ministry of Information, Myanmar.
