= Einda Thiri =

First female governor of Pagan

Einda Thiri Saw Hla Htut ဣန္ဒသီရိ စောလှထွတ်

Governor of Pagan
- Reign: c. 1433/34 – ?
- Predecessor: Tarabya
- Successor: ?
- Monarch: Mohnyin Thado (c. 1433/34–1439); Minye Kyawswa I of Ava (1439–?)
- Born: c. mid-1410s Ava Kingdom
- Died: Ava Kingdom
- Spouses: Thiha Zeya Thu
- Father: Mohnyin Thado

Einda Thiri (Burmese: ဣန္ဒသီရိ, pronounced [ʔèiɴda̰ θìɹḭ]; Pali: Indasīri; also known as Saw Hla Htut, Burmese: စောလှထွတ်) was a daughter of King Mohnyin Thado of Ava, and governor of Pagan. The princess was the first known female ruler of the Pagan (Bagan) capital region. Her tenure at the ancient capital city of Pagan (Bagan) probably began c. 1433. (Note: (Yazawin Thit Vol. 1 2012: 282) only says she was governor in her father's reign (1426–1439) without providing when exactly she was appointed. But based chronicle reporting elsewhere, she may have succeeded c. 1433/34. (Yazawin Thit Vol. 1 2012: 278) and (Hmannan Vol. 2 2003: 69–70) say Thado appointed her predecessor Tarabya's son governor of Amyint with his father's title in early 1434. This means Tarabya the elder may have died by then.) Chronicles do not say when her tenure at Pagan ended.

== Bibliography ==
- Maha Sithu (2012) [1798]. Myint Swe; Kyaw Win; Thein Hlaing (eds.). Yazawin Thit (in Burmese). Vol. 1–3 (2nd printing ed.). Yangon: Ya-Pyei Publishing.
- Royal Historical Commission of Burma (2003) [1832]. Hmannan Yazawin (in Burmese). Vol. 1–3. Yangon: Ministry of Information, Myanmar.

Einda Thiri Ava Kingdom Born: c. 1410s Died: ?
Royal titles
Preceded by Tarabya	Governor of Pagan c. 1433/34–?	Succeeded by ?
