= Thihapate II of Taungdwin =

Thihapate II of Taungdwin; သက်တော်ရှည် သီဟပတေ့

Governor of Taungdwin
- Reign: by 1364 – c. 1401
- Predecessor: Thihapate I of Taungdwin
- Successor: Thihapate III of Taungdwin
- Monarch: Narathu of Pinya (?–1364?); Uzana II of Pinya (1364); Thado Minbya (1366–1367); Swa Saw Ke (1367–1400); Tarabya (1400)
- Born: c. 1330s Pinya Kingdom
- Died: Unknown; Ava Kingdom
- Issue: Shin Myat Hla of Ava; Thiri Zeya Thura of Pakhan
- House: Pinya
- Father: Thihapate I of Taungdwin
- Mother: daughter of Thettawshay of Myinsaing
- Religion: Theravada Buddhism

Thettawshay Thihapate (Burmese: သက်တော်ရှည် သီဟပတေ့, [θɛʔdɔ̀ʃè θìha̰pətḛ]) was governor of Taungdwin from the 1360s to c. 1401 during the late Pinya and early Ava periods. After Pinya fell to King Thado Minbya of Sagaing in 1364, he became one of several Pinya vassals that refused to submit to the new king, who went on to found the Ava Kingdom in 1365. He finally submitted to Thado Minbya in 1366 after his town came under siege by Ava forces. He became a loyal vassal of Ava afterwards, and participated in Ava's military campaigns to the early 1390s. He was the father of Queen Shin Myat Hla, the chief queen consort of King Mohnyin Thado.

== Brief ==
Thettawshay Thihapate made his first appearance in the royal chronicles as the governor of Taungdwin, then a vassal state of Pinya, in 1364. He was one of the several vassal rulers of Pinya that refused to submit to Thado Minbya of Sagaing, who had captured Pinya in 1364, and founded the Ava Kingdom in 1365 as the successor state of the Pinya and Sagaing kingdoms. Although his small fief was located only about 240 km (150 mi) south of Thado Minbya's newly built capital of Ava (Inwa), Thihapate proclaimed himself independent with a royal title of "Bawa-Shin Thettawshay Thihapate" (ဘဝရှင် သက်တော်ရှည် သီဟပတေ့), (Note: According to (Aung-Thwin 2017: 58), Thihapate was a descendant of the royal family of Pagan, and "therefore had legitimate and genealogical claims to the throne.") and went on to fortify Taungdwin with a moat and high walls.

His independent rule lasted until late 1366 when Thado Minbya showed up with an army. Thihapate had prepared for a long siege since Thado Minbya took Nganwegon (modern Pyinmana), southeast of Taungdwin, earlier in the year. Confident of his defenses, Thihapate still refused to submit. Initially the defenses held; Taungdwin's skilled archers behind the high walls repeatedly held off charges by Ava forces. However, the Ava command was able to assassinate the commander of Taungdwin's archery battalion. (The assassination was carried out by Nga Tet Pya, an accomplished thief-turned-commander, who had breached the Taungdwin army's quarters after having scaled the walls at night.) The assassination broke the morale of Taungdwin's defenses. The rebel governor subsequently agreed to submit to Thado Minbya in exchange for keeping his office at Taungdwin.

Thihapate would remain a loyal vassal afterwards. He readily submitted to the next king of Ava, Swa Saw Ke, after Thado Minbya's sudden death in 1367, and was reappointed to his post by the new king in 1368. He dutifully participated in Ava's military campaigns between 1385 and 1393, leading his own Taungdwin regiment. His long tenure ended c. 1401 when the new king Minkhaung I appointed a new governor at Taungdwin. (Note: Chronicles are ambiguous as to whether Minkhaung appointed a new governor with the same title, or reappointed the same Thihapate at Taungdwin in 1401/02. However, that a new governor was appointed can be inferred from their subsequent narratives. The Maha Yazawin chronicle (1724) (Maha Yazawin Vol. 1 2006: 308) says King Minkhaung appointed one Theinpate (သိန်ပတေ့) (not Thihapate (သီဟပတေ့)) at Taungdwin in 764 ME (1402/03), a year after his accession. The Yazawin Thit chronicle (1798) (Yazawin Thit Vol. 1 2012: 212) says Minkhaung appointed someone titled Thihapate at Taungdwin soon after his accession in 762 ME (1400/1401). The Hmannan Yazawin chronicle (1832) (Hmannan Vol. 1 2003: 443) follows the Maha Yazawin's narrative: i.e. Theinpate in 764 ME (1402/03). However, the spelling သိန်ပတေ့ (Theinpate) appears to be an alternative (archaic) spelling of သီဟပတေ့ (Thihapate) as evidenced in a 15th century inscription (Yazawin Thit Vol. 1 2012: 273), which refers to the Thihapate of this article as သိန်ပတေ့ (Theinpate). Indeed, both Maha Yazawin and Hmannan Yazawin subsequently switched to "Thihapate" as the governor of Taungdwin in the military campaigns of the 1400s as seen in (Maha Yazawin Vol. 1 2006: 334) and (Hmannan Vol. 1 2003: 458) for example. Therefore, it is not conclusive one way or the other that the appointment by Minkhaung (in 1400/01 or 1402/03) refers to a new governor with the same title Thihapate/Theinpate, or a reappointment of the same Thihapate. All three chronicles' subsequent narratives to the 1420s show that one Thihapate of Taungdwin actively participated in several military campaigns to the 1420s. Thus, this Thihapate most probably was not the Thihapate of this article who would have been too old to be going to the front. Although the Maha Yazawin never identifies who the new Thihapate was, (Yazawin Thit Vol. 1 2012: 275) eventually identifies this Thihapate (in 1426) as a younger brother of Sithu of Myinsaing, son-in-law of King Swa Saw Ke. (Hmannan Vol. 2 2003: 65) accepts Yazawin Thit's account. Furthermore, the appointment by Minkhaung likely took place in late 1400 or early 1401. According to the inscriptional evidence, per (Than Tun 1959: 128), Minkhaung became king on 25 November 1400, which agrees with the Yazawin Thit's accession date of 762 ME (1400/1401).) He was still alive in 1402/03 according to a contemporary inscription at the Myazigon Pagoda in Kyaukpadaung, describing his donation at the pagoda. It is unclear if he was still alive in 1409/10 when his daughter Shin Myat Hla briefly became a junior queen of Minkhaung for five months, or in 1410 when she was married off to Commander Thado by the king himself.

The governor of Taungdwin is remembered through his progeny. Through Myat Hla, who became the chief queen consort of Ava in 1426, all the kings of Ava from 1439 to 1527 were his descendants. Also through Myat Hla, Thihapate was a nine times great-grandfather of King Alaungpaya, the founder of Konbaung dynasty.

== List of military campaigns ==
The following is a list of military campaigns in which he went to the front as part of the Ava armed forces. His 1364–1366/67 rebellion against King Thado Minbya is not included.

| Campaign | Duration | Troops commanded | Notes |
|---|---|---|---|
| Ava–Hanthawaddy War (1385–1391) | 1385–86 | 1 regiment | Commanded a regiment in the First Army (7000 men in 9 regiments) that invaded Hanthawaddy via Toungoo |
| Ava–Hanthawaddy War (1385–1391) | 1386–87 | 1 regiment | Commanded a regiment in the riverine force (12,000 men in 11 regiments) |
| Ava–Hanthawaddy War (1385–1391) | 1390–91 | 1 regiment | Commanded a regiment in the riverine force (12,000 men in 12 regiments) |
| Mohnyin–Ava War | 1392–93 | 1 regiment | Commanded a regiment; fought in the Battle of Shangon |

== Bibliography ==
- Aung-Thwin, Michael A. (2017). Myanmar in the Fifteenth Century. Honolulu: University of Hawai'i Press. ISBN 978-0-8248-6783-6.
- Kala, U (2006) [1724]. Maha Yazawin (in Burmese). Vol. 1–3 (4th printing ed.). Yangon: Ya-Pyei Publishing.
- Letwe Nawrahta; Maha Sithu (1961) [c. 1770]. Hla Thamein (ed.). Alaungpaya Ayedawbon (in Burmese). Ministry of Culture, Union of Burma.
- Maha Sithu (2012) [1798]. Kyaw Win; Thein Hlaing (eds.). Yazawin Thit (in Burmese). Vol. 1–3 (2nd ed.). Yangon: Ya-Pyei Publishing.
- Royal Historical Commission of Burma (2003) [1832]. Hmannan Yazawin (in Burmese). Vol. 1–3. Yangon: Ministry of Information, Myanmar.
- Than Tun (December 1959). "History of Burma: A.D. 1300–1400". Journal of Burma Research Society. XLII (II).

Thihapate II of Taungdwin Pinya and Ava Born: c. 1330s Died: ?
| Preceded by Thihapate I of Taungdwin | Governor of Taungdwin by 1364 – c. 1401 | Succeeded by Thihapate III of Taungdwin |
