= Minye Kyawhtin of Toungoo =

Pretender to Ava throne (1426–1459)

Minye Kyawhtin မင်းရဲကျော်ထင်

Self Proclaimed King of Toungoo
- Reign: c. February 1452 – c. February 1459
- Predecessor: Minkhaung I of Toungoo (as governor)
- Successor: Thiri Zeya Thura (as governor)

Ruler of Pinle
- Reign: c. early 1428 – c. December 1445
- Predecessor: Thray Thinkhaya of Pinle
- Born: c. early 1408; Saturday, late 769 ME or early 770 ME; Ava (Inwa); Ava Kingdom
- Died: c. February 1459 (aged ~51) c. Tabaung 820 ME; Toungoo (Taungoo); Ava Kingdom
- Spouses: Princess of Yamethin
- Issue: Minye Teittha; unnamed daughter; Minye Aung Naing
- Father: Minye Kyawswa
- Mother: Saw Min Hla
- Religion: Theravada Buddhism

Minye Kyawhtin (Burmese: မင်းရဲ ကျော်ထင်, pronounced [mɪ́ɴ.jɛ́ tɕɔ̀.dɪ̀ɴ]; also known as Min-nge Kyawhtin (မင်းငယ် ကျော်ထင်), [mɪ́ɴ.ŋɛ̀ tɕɔ̀.dɪ̀ɴ]; 1408–1459) was a pretender to the Ava throne from 1426 to 1459. The eldest son of Crown Prince Minye Kyawswa, Minye Kyawhtin raised a long-running rebellion against King Mohnyin Thado (r. 1426–1439) and his successors, kings Minye Kyawswa I (r. 1439–1442) and Narapati I of Ava (r. 1442–1468).

Despite his claim to the throne, the prince found support only in one former vassal state, Onbaung (Hsipaw/Thibaw). Except for a brief period in 1427–1428, his rebellion never posed a real threat to Ava. He did hold on to Pinle, a well-fortified outpost at the edge of the Ava (Inwa) capital region, until the mid-1440s. He was finally driven out in 1445, a year after Onbaung sided with Ava during the Chinese invasions of present-day northern Myanmar. He reemerged in 1452 by staging a successful coup against his cousin Gov. Minkhaung I of Toungoo, and gaining control of Ava's main vassal state in the southeast. Styled as "King of Toungoo", Kyawhtin ruled the southeastern region like a sovereign. He was assassinated by one of his men in 1459.

== Early life ==
Born c. early 1408, (Note: (Hmannan Vol. 2 2003: 21, 63): Minye Kyawhtin was in his 6th year (at age 5) in 775 ME (30 March 1413 to 29 March 1414), and in his 19th year (at age 18) when he was captured by Mohnyin Thado's forces in Tawthalin 788 ME (2–31 August 1426). Since his parents were married only c. December 1406, he was born in late 1407 at the earliest, or more probably in or before August/September 1408 (Tawthalin 770 ME). Per (Yazawin Thit Vol. 1 2012: 274) and (Hmannan Vol. 2 2003: 65), he was born on a Saturday.) Minye Kyawhtin was the eldest child of Princess Saw Min Hla and Crown Prince Minye Kyawswa of Ava. He and his three younger siblings—Min Hla Htut, Minye Aung Naing and Saw Min Phyu—grew up in the royal capital of Ava (Inwa). After their father fell in action on a campaign against Hanthawaddy Pegu in March 1415, Kyawhtin accompanied his grandfather King Minkhaung I (r. 1400–1421), who immediately marched to the battle site in the south. The young prince witnessed his father's bones being exhumed, and dropped in a solemn ceremony at the river mouth near Twante.

Kyawhtin steadily lost his position in the line of succession afterwards. In 1416, Minkhaung appointed his middle son Minye Thihathu heir-apparent, and wedded Thihathu and Saw Min Hla. In 1417, the union produced a son Min Hla (Kyawhtin's half brother), who became second in the line of succession. Min Hla subsequently became the heir presumptive in 1421 when Thihathu succeeded Minkhaung.

== Ava succession crisis (1425–1426) ==
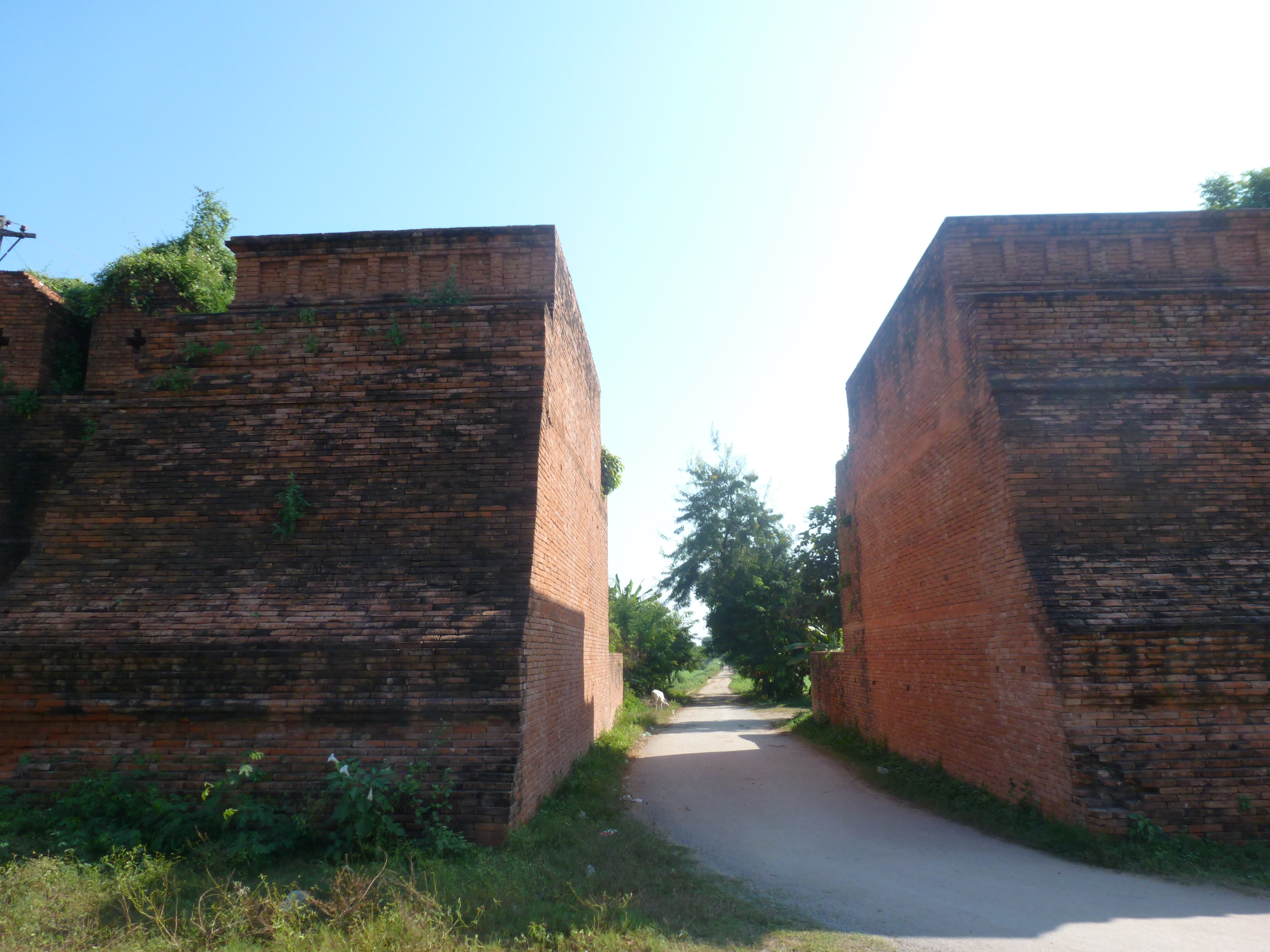
Remains of the outer walls of Ava today

Minye Kyawhtin faded into the background until 1425. That year, Ava was rocked by twin assassinations of kings Thihathu (r. 1421–1425) and his successor Min Hla (r. 1425), three months apart. The assassinations were engineered by Queen Shin Bo-Me and Prince Min Nyo of Kale (r. 1425–1426), who seized the throne in November 1425. Kyawhtin and his uncle Prince Tarabya Minye Kyawhtin of Pakhan submitted to Nyo, who was the only son of King Tarabya of Ava (r. 1400) and a senior general in the military. But in May 1426 when Nyo was about to lose the subsequent civil war to Gov. Thado of Mohnyin, Tarabya declared himself independent, not recognizing either Nyo or Thado. Kyawhtin sided with his uncle, and joined him in Pakhan.

But their rebellion was short-lived. Tarabya could not get any vassal rulers, even those near Pakhan, to support him. Pakhan easily fell to Thado's forces in August 1426, and both Tarabya and Kyawhtin were captured. King Thado (r. 1426–1439), who began his career as a page for Prince Min Swe (later King Minkhaung), had a soft side for the only living son and the eldest grandson of his deceased lord. Instead of executing the royals with the strongest claim to the throne, the new king sent Tarabya to live in an estate near the Shwezigon Pagoda in Pagan (Bagan), and Kyawhtin to Thissein (modern Shwebo District).

== Early campaigns to Ava (1426–1428) ==
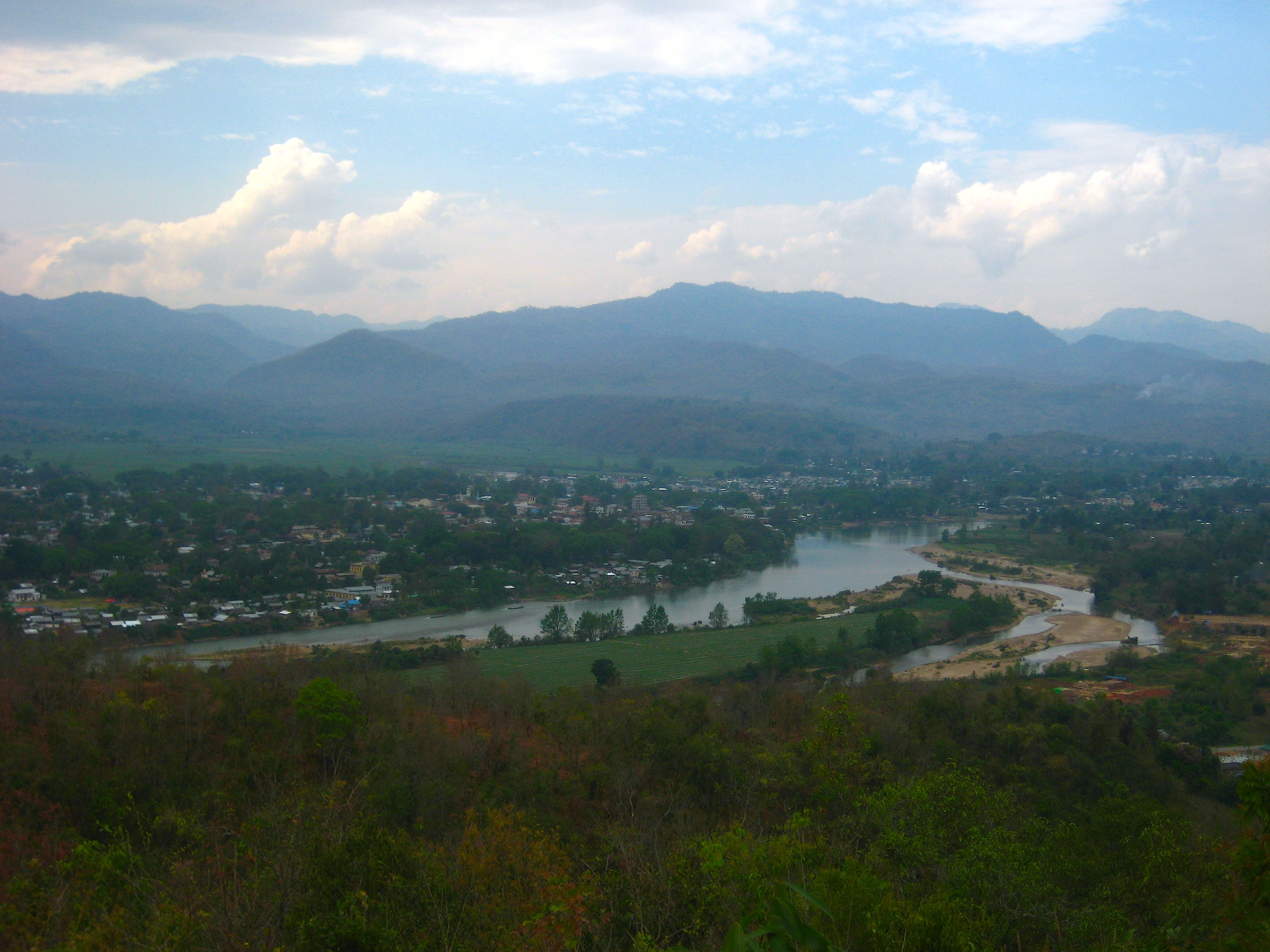
Onbaung, present day Hsipaw (Thibaw)

Thado would soon come to rue his decision to spare the princes' lives. Although Tarabya is not heard from again in the chronicles, Minye Kyawhtin never gave up his claim to the throne. The young prince promptly fled Thissein, and soon found a backer in Le Than Bwa, the sawbwa of Onbaung (modern Hsipaw/Thibaw), a major Shan-speaking vassal state in the northeast. Kyawhtin then raised a rebellion that would last until 1459.

=== First campaign (1426–1427) ===
His rebellion was one of many insurrections that sprang up around the kingdom in 1426–1427. Many vassals simply refused to acknowledge Thado, who did not hail from the founding house of the dynasty. Unlike other vassals however, Kyawhtin claimed the throne outright, and planned to conquer Ava itself. His first campaign came in late 1426 right after Toungoo, a major vassal state in the southeast, declared independence. He occupied Yenantha (modern northern Mandalay Region), about 60 km northeast of the royal capital. But his timing was not right. Thado had not diverted his troops to the Toungoo front, and a 15,000-strong Ava army promptly drove Kyawhtin back to Onbaung.

But the army could not follow him to Onbaung. More serious rebellions—by Thado's hitherto allies–arose. In January 1427, the sawbwa (governor) of Mogaung in the north revolted after being passed over for the governorship of Mohnyin. (Note: (Yazawin Thit Vol. 1 2012: 274–275) and (Hmannan Vol. 2 2003: 64–65): The Sawbwa of Mogaung was a supporter of Thado, and had fought alongside Thado. He returned to Mogaung after spending eight months in Ava—i.e. c. January 1427, expecting the governorship of Mohnyin, Thado's old post. But when Thado gave the governorship to someone else, the sawbwa revolted soon after.) More ominously for Thado, the rebel governors of Toungoo and Taungdwin made a pact with King Binnya Ran I of Hanthawaddy Pegu to take over Prome (Pyay). By early 1427, Ran's forces had occupied Tharrawaddy, a southernmost district of Prome, and threatened Prome itself.

=== Second campaign (1427–1428) ===
Kyawhtin decided to strike again in late 1427, but this time only after the main Ava forces had left for the southern front. Backed by nine battalions from Onbaung, he found little initial resistance, and quickly advanced as far as Tabetswe, just 25 km southeast of Ava. Thado was caught off guard, and had to scramble to organize a defensive force to hold Kyawhtin at Tabetswe. The force, led by Gen. Baya Gamani, eventually pushed Kyawhtin back to Pinle (modern Myittha Township), about 70 km southeast of Ava.

== Ruler of Pinle (1428–1445) ==
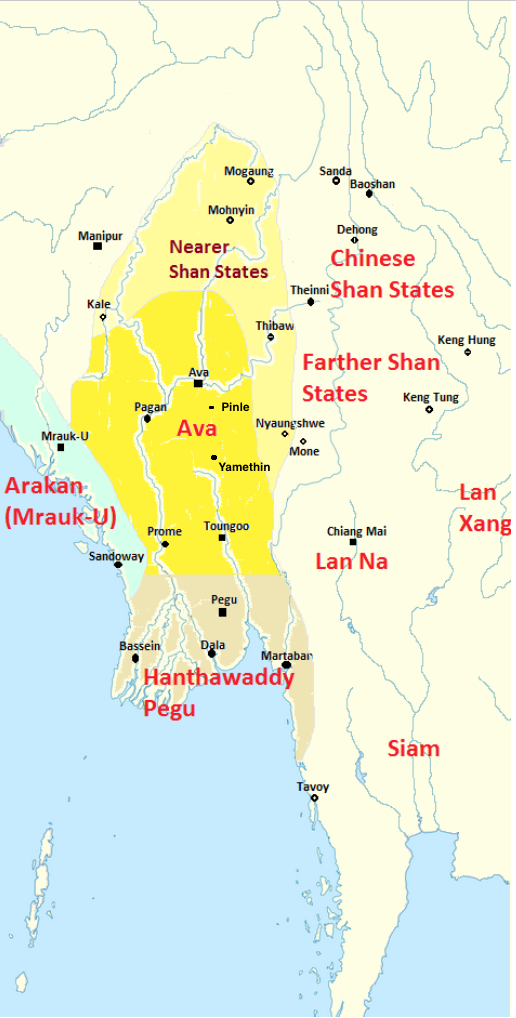
Minye Kyawhtin's Pinle was supported by Onbaung (Hsipaw/Thibaw). He later took over Yamethin in 1443.

The campaign turned out to be the closest Kyawhtin came to capturing Ava. The prince would not be able to launch another serious campaign of any kind that threatened the capital. Still, with Onbaung's assistance, he was strong just enough to hold on to Pinle at the edge of the capital region until 1445.

=== Ava's sieges of Pinle (1428–1429, 1433–1434) ===
Ava did try to drive him out of Pinle by using both military and diplomatic means. (The town was one of the "original eleven districts" (khayaing) since the Pagan period, and was well defended by high brick walls.) In 1428–1429, the prince outlasted a three-month siege by a small Ava army (1500 troops, 300 cavalry, 20 elephants). Unable to break through, the Ava court sent a mission to Onbaung to persuade Le Than Bwa to withdraw the sawbwa's support of Kyawhtin. (Thado also sent a similar mission to Yat Sauk Naung Mun (modern Lawksawk Township), a backer of the Taungdwin and Yemethin rebellions.) Both missions failed, and the rebellions continued.

Despite Le Than Bwa's continued support, Kyawhtin could not get the backing of any other vassals. He could not muster enough manpower to be a viable threat to Ava. Indeed, he managed to survive because Ava had bigger concerns elsewhere. Ava had been preoccupied by Pegu's designs on Prome since 1427, and fought a losing war against the southern kingdom in 1430–1431. Ava turned its attention to the rebel states only in 1433, sending an army (5000 troops, 300 cavalry, 12 elephants) to Pinle, Yamethin and Taungdwin. But the feeble expedition failed to take a single town.

It was the last time Thado tried to take the rebel regions by force. Frustrated by the failures, the king, a former general, became increasingly withdrawn, and turned to building/renovating pagodas and resetting the Burmese calendar's epochal year to 1436. He famously did nothing in 1437 when Ran blatantly placed his nominee Saw Oo in Toungoo.

=== Resumption of Ava attacks (1440–1441, 1442–1443, 1445) ===
The unofficial ceasefire ended with Thado's death in 1439. Thado's eldest son Minye Kyawswa I (r. 1439–1442) succeeded, and immediately set out to reclaim the rebel regions. After a successful campaign in 1439–1440 that recaptured Kale (Kalay) and Mohnyin, Ava forces (7000 troops, 400 cavalry, 20 elephants) attacked the southern rebel regions in 1440–1441. The reinvigorated Ava forces captured Taungdwin and Toungoo in succession; Pinle and Yamethin survived only because they were not the main targets of the campaign. (Note: Hmannan (Hmannan Vol. 2 2003: 79) contains a typographical error as to when Toungoo was taken. It says Minye Kyawswa sent an army in 802 ME to Toungoo, Taungdwin, Yamethin and Pinle. Then in the next paragraph on the same page says Toungoo was conquered in 804 ME (1442/43); the next page, p. 80, then says Minye Kyawswa died in 803 ME (1441/42). Other chronicles Yazawin Thit (Yazawin Thit Vol. 1 2012: 283) and Toungoo Yazawin (Sein Lwin Lay 2006: 30) say Ava regained Toungoo in 802 ME (1440/41).)

Kyawhtin got a breather in 1441–1442 as Ava forces were back in the north to reclaim Mogaung. The northernmost Shan state fell in April 1442 as a new king, Narapati I (r. 1442–1468), came to power in Ava. Buoyed by the success, the new king sent an 8000-strong army to Yamethin and Pinle, the only holdouts in the southeast, in November 1442. Yamethin surrendered without a fight but Kyawhtin refused. Ava forces laid siege to Pinle but the prince would be bailed out yet again. In March 1443, a Chinese army invaded from the north, and the Ava army withdrew from Pinle. (According to Chinese records, the expedition was to demand the return of Si Renfa (Tho Ngan Bwa), the rebel chief of Mong Mao, who had taken refuge in Ava.)

With Ava forces in the north, Kyawhtin promptly occupied Yamethin. His wife was a daughter of the famed governor of Yamethin, Thilawa. But his success was temporary. Ava troops successfully held off the Chinese. More importantly, the Chinese invasion forced Onbaung, (Note: (Fernquest 2005: 297): The Shan states of Hsenwi and Hsipaw (Onbaung) defined a boundary between Chinese and Burmese spheres of influence in the Shan realm.) the long-time backer of Kyawhtin, to side with Ava in 1444. Kyawhtin did not follow Onbaung, and remained defiant. After Ava and Ming governments reached a truce in late 1445, (Note: (Hmannan Vol. 2 2003: 86–87): The truce was reached a few days after Tuesday, 3rd waxing of Nadaw 847 ME (2 November 1445).) Narapati ordered an all out attack on Kyawhtin. According to the Burmese chronicles, the Chinese agreed to help with the campaign to dislodge Kyawhtin in exchange for the Burmese delivering the renegade sawbwa the Chinese were after. Kyawhtin had planned to make his stand at Yamethin but when he heard about an overwhelming force coming his way, he fled.

== Ruler of Toungoo (1452–1459) ==
Minye Kyawhtin was to reemerge, however, as the ruler of a far more strategic state, Toungoo (Taungoo), in 1452. He would remain there unchallenged by Ava for the next seven years until his assassination in 1459.

=== Takeover of Toungoo (1452) ===
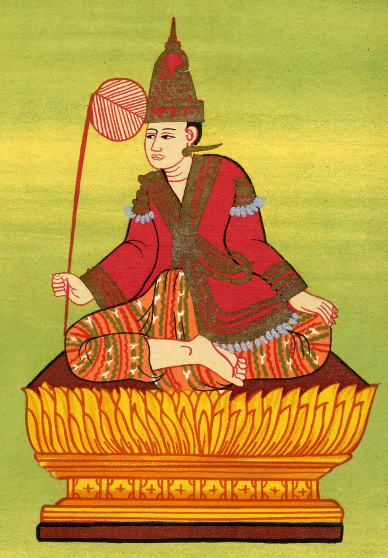
Governor Minkhaung I represented as a nat (spirit)

After Yamethin, Minye Kyawhtin and his family went into hiding. Out of a village, apparently in or close to modern Taungoo District, Kyawhtin plotted to take over the region, which was ruled by his second cousin Gov. Minkhaung I of Toungoo. In early 1452, (Note: Chronicles (Yazawin Thit Vol. 1 2012: 291–293) (Hmannan Vol. 2 2003: 91, 94) simply say that Kyawhtin came to power in 813 ME (30 March 1451 to 29 March 1452), and died in late 820 ME, before turning 821 ME—i.e. c. March 1459, having ruled for seven years. This means he probably came to power in early 1452.) with the help of an inside man—Minkhaung's head of the elephant stables— who was loyal to him, Kyawhtin and his hundred followers slipped inside the city, and stormed the governor's residence, killing Minkhaung. Kyawhtin took over the provincial capital, and proclaimed himself "king" of Toungoo.

The fall of Toungoo was a major blow to Ava. Kyawhtin had now gained control of a major vassal state. With the Chinese threat still lurking in the north, King Narapati did not respond to the takeover. For his part, Kyawhtin did not attack Ava or try to take over other nearby vassal states. Chronicles say that it was only then that Kyawhtin had essentially given up his claim to the Ava throne, and was now content to be "king" of a province.

=== Death ===
In any case, no fighting took place between Ava and Toungoo in the next seven years. Minye Kyawhtin ruled the region like a sovereign. He apparently conducted his own diplomacy as one of his sons was married to a princess from Hanthawaddy Pegu. His rule is not remembered kindly, however. The local chronicle Toungoo Yazawin harshly remembers him as a tyrant and a womanizer, who terrorized the populace. In the end, his demise came not from Ava's machinations but from his own doing. According to the Toungoo Yazawin, seven years into his rule, he sexually assaulted a young woman, who happened to be a younger sister of Kyawhtin's bodyguard Nga Tan-Si, a grandson of Gov. Thinkhaya III of Toungoo; "overcome by shame" Tan-Si is said to have cut down Kyawhtin with his sword at once. The main chronicles simply say that Kyawhtin was assassinated by Nga Tan-Si, grandson of Thinkhaya III of Toungoo.

After Kyawhtin's death, Narapati sent an army led by Crown Prince Maha Thihathura to Toungoo. The city offered no resistance. In April 1459, the king appointed Gov. Thiri Zeya Thura of Taungdwin to assume the governorship of Toungoo. (Thiri Zeya Thura was the husband of Saw Pyei Chantha, one of Kyawhtin's younger half sisters.)

== Family ==
According to the Hmannan Yazawin, Minye Kyawhtin's principal wife was the youngest daughter of Gov. Thilawa of Yamethin, (Note: Since Thilawa died in 1395/96 per (Hmannan Vol. 1 2003: 434), his youngest daughter was born in 1395/96 at the latest. This means: (1) she was at least 12 years older than Minye Kyawhtin; (2) she was his second cousin, once removed; King Swa Saw Ke (r. 1367–1400) was her maternal grandfather, and his paternal great grandfather.) and the couple had a daughter, who was married to Mingyi Swa of Prome, and a son named Minye Teittha, who died in Ava.

However, the local chronicle of Toungoo, the Toungoo Yazawin says Minye Kyawhtin had three children by his principal wife:

- Minye Teittha — brought back to Ava
- unnamed daughter — wife of Mingyi Swa of Prome
- Minye Aung Naing — husband of Princess Mwei Ma Ni of Hanthawaddy Pegu

== Bibliography ==
- Aung-Thwin, Michael A. (2017). Myanmar in the Fifteenth Century. Honolulu: University of Hawai'i Press. ISBN 978-0-8248-6783-6.
- Fernquest, Jon (Autumn 2005). "Min-gyi-nyo, the Shan Invasions of Ava (1524–27), and the Beginnings of Expansionary Warfare in Toungoo Burma: 1486–1539" (PDF). SOAS Bulletin of Burma Research. 3 (2).
- Harvey, G. E. (1925). History of Burma: From the Earliest Times to 10 March 1824. London: Frank Cass & Co. Ltd.
- Liew, Foon Ming (1996). "The Luchuan-Pingmian Campaigns (1436–1449) in the Light of Official Chinese Historiography". Oriens Extremus. 39 (2). Harrassowitz Verlag: 162–203. JSTOR 24047471.
- Kala, U (2006) [1724]. Maha Yazawin (in Burmese). Vol. 1–3 (4th ed.). Yangon: Ya-Pyei Publishing.
- Maha Sithu (2012) [1798]. Kyaw Win; Thein Hlaing (eds.). Yazawin Thit (in Burmese). Vol. 1–3 (2nd ed.). Yangon: Ya-Pyei Publishing.
- Royal Historians of Burma (1960) [c. 1680]. Hla Thamein (ed.). Zatadawbon Yazawin. Historical Research Directorate of the Union of Burma.
- Royal Historical Commission of Burma (2003) [1832]. Hmannan Yazawin (in Burmese). Vol. 1–3. Yangon: Ministry of Information, Myanmar.
- Sein Lwin Lay, Kahtika U (2006) [1968]. Mintaya Shwe Hti and Bayinnaung: Ketumadi Taungoo Yazawin (in Burmese) (2nd ed.). Yangon: Yan Aung Sarpay.

Minye Kyawhtin of Toungoo Ava Kingdom Born: c. early 1408 Died: c. February 1459
Royal titles
Preceded by Minkhaung I as governor	King of Toungoo; 1452–1459	Succeeded by Thiri Zeya Thura as governor
Preceded by Thray Thinkhaya of Pinle as governor	Ruler of Pinle; 1428–1445	Succeeded by
