= Min Pale of Paukmyaing =

Min Pale of Paukmyaing; ပေါက်မြိုင် မင်းပုလဲ

Governor of Paukmyaing
- Reign: c. 1347 – c. 1402
- Successor: Sithu
- King: Kyawswa I of Pinya; Kyawswa II of Pinya; Narathu of Pinya; Uzana II of Pinya; Swa Saw Ke; Tarabya; Minkhaung I
- Born: c. 1330
- Died: c. 1402
- Spouse: Shwe Einthe of Pinya
- Issue: Saw Diga of Mye-Ne
- House: Pinya
- Father: Yandathu I of Lanbu
- Mother: Mway Medaw of Lanbu
- Religion: Theravada Buddhism

Min Pale (Burmese: မင်းပုလဲ, pronounced [mɪ́ɴ pəlɛ́]; c. 1330 – c. 1402) was governor of Paukmyaing in the Kingdom of Ava in the late 14th century. He was a grandson of King Uzana I of Pinya, and was one of the four top commanders of King Swa Saw Ke of Ava. He was the paternal grandfather of King Mohnyin Thado. All the kings of the Konbaung Dynasty claimed descent from him.

== Brief ==
According to the 18th century Alaungpaya Ayedawbon chronicle, Min Pale's father Yandathu was descended from kings Naratheinkha and Sithu II of Pagan Dynasty while his mother Mway Medaw was a daughter of King Uzana I of Pinya. The 19th century Hmannan Yazawin chronicle identifies his personal name as Nga Shwe. He had at least one younger sister named Saw Chit Ke, who was the wife of Min Letya of Nyaungyan. Pale was married to Shwe Einthe, daughter of King Kyawswa I of Pinya (r. 1344–50). (Note: Hmannan (Hmannan Vol. 1 2003: 380) gratuitously states that Shwe Einthe married late because her face was full of scars from chickenpox, and that her parents were resigned her to be single until Min Pale came along.) The couple had at least one son, Saw Diga.

Kyawswa I appointed his son-in-law governor of Paukmyaing, a small town in modern Kyaukse Township. He was reappointed at the position at the accession ceremony of King Swa Saw Ke. Pale rose to become one of the four highest ranking generals (Note: (MSK Vol. 13 1973: 134–135) and (Hmannan Vol. 1 2003: 435): The other three top generals were Thilawa of Yamethin, Theinkhathu Saw Hnaung and Tuyin of Inyi.) in the Royal Army although his ascent to the top echelon came late in his life. He was first mentioned as a commander only in 1390.

Pale most probably had died by 1402 when King Minkhaung I appointed Sithu as the new governor of Paukmyaing. He was the paternal grandfather of King Mohnyin Thado (r. 1426–39). King Alaungpaya, the founder of Konbaung Dynasty, claimed descent from him.

== Military service ==
The following is his military service as a commander.

Campaign	Duration	Troops commanded	Notes
Ava–Hanthawaddy War (1385–1391)	1390–91	1 regiment	Commanded a regiment in the riverine force (12,000 men in 12 regiments)
Mohnyin–Ava War	1392–93	1 regiment	Commander of armored infantry corps

== Ancestry ==
The governor was descended ultimately from the Pagan royalty.

Ancestry of Governor-General Min Pale

8. Min Pe Gyi
4. Min Pe Nge of Myittha
9. Pwa Gyi of Pagan
2. Yandathu of Lanbu
10. Yanda Pyissi
5. Khin Hpone
11. (unnamed)
1. Pale
12. Kyawswa of Pagan
6. Uzana I of Pinya
13. Mi Saw U
3. Mway Medaw of Lanbu
14. Kyawswa of Pagan
7. Atula Maha Dhamma Dewi of Pinya
15. Saw Soe of Pagan

== Bibliography ==
- Letwe Nawrahta & Twinthin Taikwun (1961) [c. 1770]. Hla Thamein (ed.). Alaungpaya Ayedawbon (in Burmese). Ministry of Culture, Union of Burma.
- Maha Sithu (2012) [1798]. Kyaw Win; Thein Hlaing (eds.). Yazawin Thit (in Burmese). Vol. 1–3 (2nd ed.). Yangon: Ya-Pyei Publishing.
- Royal Historical Commission of Burma (2003) [1832]. Hmannan Yazawin (in Burmese). Vol. 1–3. Yangon: Ministry of Information, Myanmar.

Min Pale of Paukmyaing Ava Kingdom Born: c. 1330 Died: c. 1402
Royal titles
Preceded by	Governor of Paukmyaing c. 1347–1402	Succeeded by Sithu
