= Thiri Zeya Thura of Pakhan =

Thiri Zeya Thura သီရိဇေယျသူရ

Governor of Pakhan
- Reign: August 1426 – c. August 1429
- Predecessor: Tarabya Minye Kyawhtin
- Successor: Thihapate
- Born: 1389 or later Taungdwin; Ava Kingdom
- Died: c. August 1429; Pakhan? Ava Kingdom
- Spouse: Shin Myat Hla of Pakhan
- Issue: Thihapate of Mohnyin? Min Hla Nyet of Ava; Thiri Zeya Thura of Taungdwin
- House: Pinya
- Father: Thihapate II of Taungdwin
- Mother: daughter of Thettawshay of Myinsaing

Thiri Zeya Thura (Burmese: သီရိဇေယျသူရ, pronounced [θìɹḭ zèja̰ θùɹa̰]) was governor of Pakhan from 1426 to 1429. A younger brother of Queen Shin Myat Hla of Ava, he was posted at Pakhan in August 1426 by his brother-in-law King Mohnyin Thado. He was the father of Queen Min Hla Nyet of Ava.

== Ancestry ==
The following is his older sister Queen Shin Myat Hla's ancestry as given in the Hmannan Yazawin chronicle. (Note: (Hmannan Vol. 2 2003: 62–63): Queen Mya Hla's fresco writings from the Shwe Kyaung Monastery in Pagan (Bagan), her paternal grandfather was Thray Sithu, and her maternal grandfather was Thettawshay. The writers of Hmannan identified the Thettawshay as Thettawshay of Myinsaing, who was a son-in-law of King Thihathu. Since King Thihathu died in 1325, the maternal grandmother was unlikely to have been Thihathu's daughter. It is likely that Queen Myat Hla and Thiri Zeya Thura's maternal grandmother was another wife of Thet-taw-shay.) His father was governor of Taungdwin from the 1360s to at least until 1402. (Note: (Hmannan Vol. 1 2003: 398, 400): His father declared himself king with the title of Thet-taw-shay Thihapate when the Pinya Kingdom collapsed in 1364. He submitted to the new king, Thado Minbya, in the dry season of 1366–67, only after the latter had laid siege to Taungdwin. According to inscriptional evidence, Thihapate was still governor of Taungdwin in 1402 per (Hmannan Vol. 2 2003: 63).)

Ancestry of Thiri Zeya Thura

4. Thray Sithu
2. Thihapate II of Taungdwin
5.
1. Thiri Zeya Thura
6. Thettawshay of Myinsaing
3. unnamed
7. unnamed

== Bibliography ==
- Kala, U (2006) [1724]. Maha Yazawin (in Burmese). Vol. 1–3 (4th printing ed.). Yangon: Ya-Pyei Publishing.
- Maha Sithu (2012) [1798]. Myint Swe; Kyaw Win; Thein Hlaing (eds.). Yazawin Thit (in Burmese). Vol. 1–3 (2nd printing ed.). Yangon: Ya-Pyei Publishing.
- Royal Historical Commission of Burma (1832). Hmannan Yazawin (in Burmese). Vol. 1–3 (2003 ed.). Yangon: Ministry of Information, Myanmar.

Thiri Zeya Thura of Pakhan Ava Kingdom Born: c. 1389 or later Died: 1429
Royal titles
Preceded by Tarabya Minye Kyawhtin	Governor of Pakhan; 1426–1429	Succeeded by Thihapate I of Pakhan
