= Taungdwingyi =

Taungdwingyi တောင်တွင်းကြီး Ponnawaddy
- Town
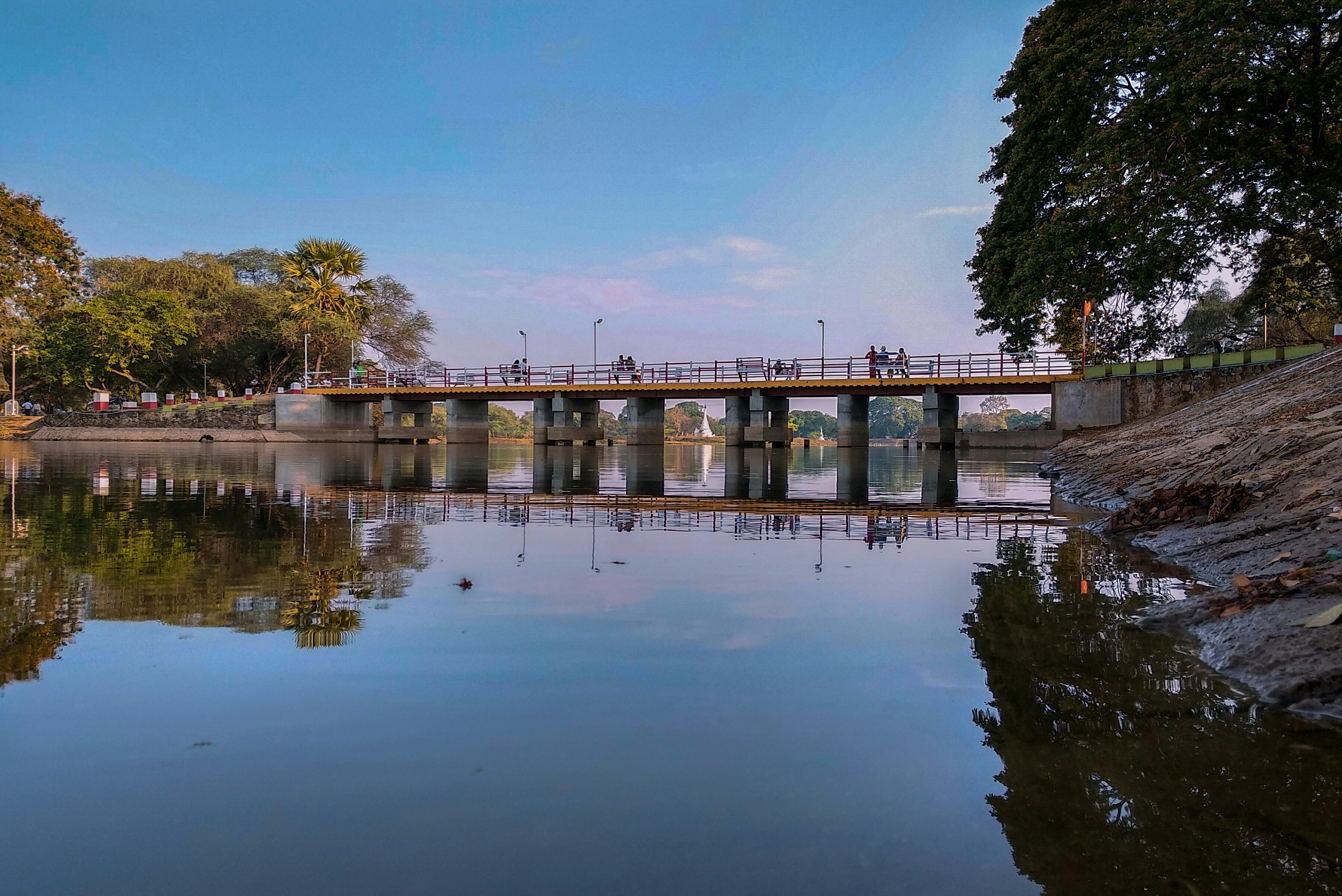
- Kandawgyi Lake of Taungdwingyi
- Nickname: Taungdwin
- Location within Myanmar
- Coordinates: 20°00′06″N 95°32′46″E
- Country: Myanmar
- Division: Magway Region
- District: Magway District
- Township: Taungdwingyi Township
- Elevation: 138 m (453 ft)

Population
  - Total: 145,909

Demographics
  - Ethnicities: chiefly Bamar
- Time zone: UTC+06:30 (MST)
- Area Code: 063
- Geocode: MMR009004

Taungdwingyi (Burmese: တောင်တွင်းကြီး [tàʊɰ̃dwɪ́ɰ̃dʑí]) is a specific town located in Magway Region, Myanmar. Its known for Rakhine Pagoda a massive pagoda siiting in Central Taungdwingyi. The pagoda underwent the extensive renovations, which were completed in 2013. The town has a natural landmark and landscape.

== Town scape ==
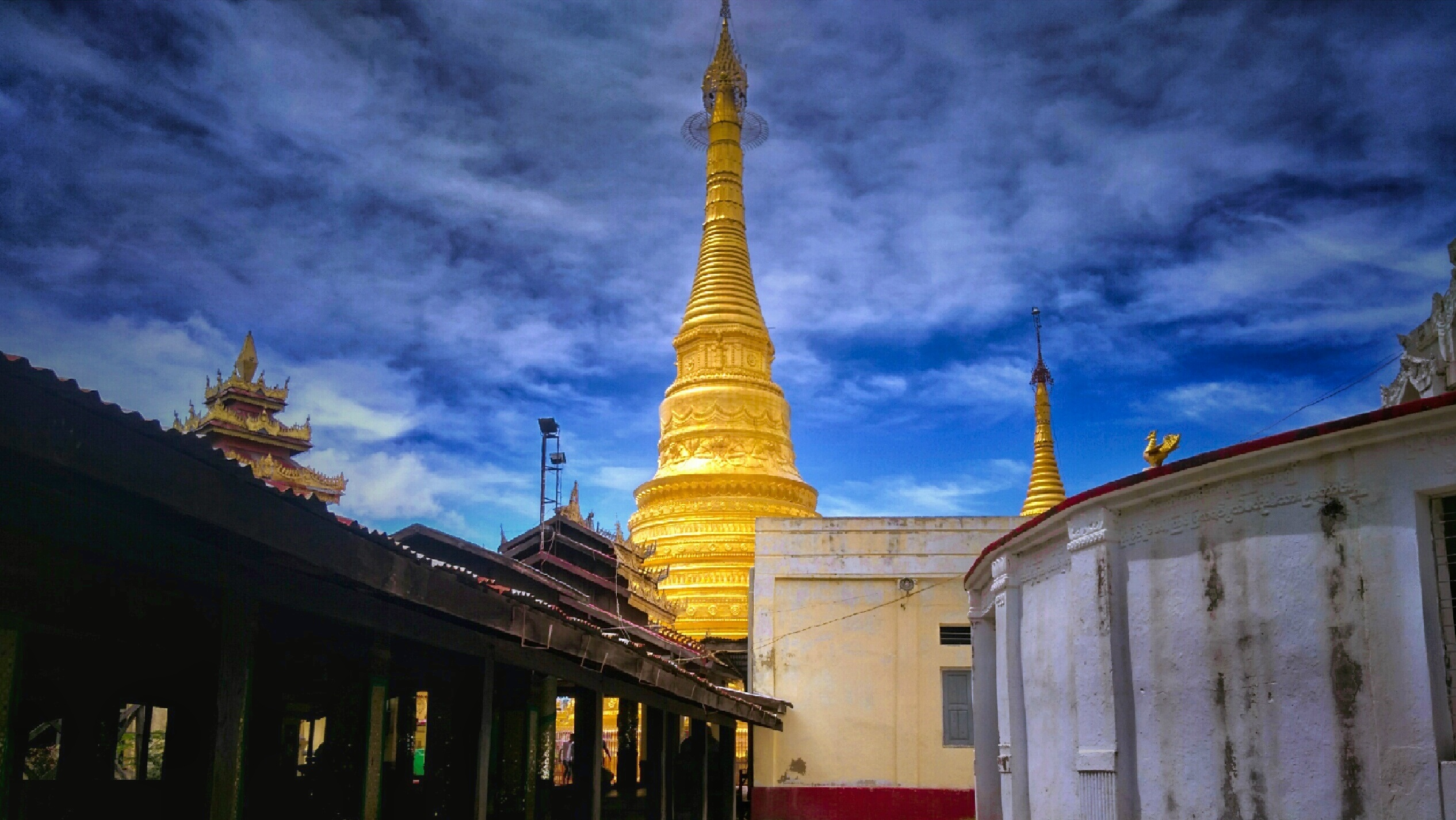
Zeya Mingala Shweindaung Pagoda

The town is divided into ten main quarters. They are Ohndaw Quarter 1, Ohndaw Quarter 2, Taungbyin Quarter 1, Taungbyin Quarter 2, Shwe-oh Quarter 1, Shwe-oh Quarter 2, Maungdaing Quarter 1, Maungdaing Quarter 2, Shwe Kya-in Quarter 1 and Shwe Kya-in Quarter 2. At the center of the town are the Myoma Zay central market, and the Independence Park. The Kandawgyi Lake, which used to be a weir in ancient times, is located on the east side, and is ringed by a number of historic Buddhist monasteries. Zeya Mingala Shweindaung is the most sacred pagoda in the township. The Aung Myin Zeya Rakhine Pagoda located at the western part of the town is the largest pagoda in the township. Once, it was in a state of decay and renovation was finished in 2013.

== Economy ==
Economic of this town is based on agriculture and trading agricultural products. Onion, rice, beans, grains, and sugarcane are grown. Peanut oil is also a major product of the town.

== Transportation ==
Taungdwingyi is connected to Magway (68 km (42 mi)) to the West, Pyay (162 km (101 mi)) to the South and Naypyidaw (68 km (42 mi)) to the East, by means of territorial roads and railways. By the territorial roads, it is 227 km (141 mi) to Mandalay and 365 km (227 mi) to Yangon. The closest major airport is the Magway Airport (MWQ).

== History ==
The Taungdwingyi region is one of the earliest inhabited regions in Myanmar. The Pyu city of Beikthano was founded around 200 BCE. During the Ava period (1364–1555), the region produced a number of famous poets and writers such as Shin Ohnnyo, Shin Khayma, Shin Uttama and Shin Maha Thilawuntha, Shin Nyeinme and Khingyi Phyaw.

== Weather ==
April is warmest with an average temperature of 39 °C (102 °F) at noon. January is coldest with an average temperature of 14 °C (57 °F) at night. Temperatures drop sharply at night. January is on average the month with most sunshine. The wet season has a rainfall peak around August, the dry season is around the month of March.

== Nature ==
Taungdwingyi has a humid (> 0.65 p/pet) climate. The climate is classified as a tropical monsoon (short dry season, monsoon rains other months), with a subtropical dry forest biozone . The soil in the area is high in nitosols, andosols (nt), soil with deep, clay-enriched lower horizon with shiny ped surfaces.

== List of rulers of Taungdwin ==
=== Pinya and Ava periods ===
Name	Term From	Term Until	Relationship to predecessor(s)	Overlord(s)	Notes
Thihapate I	by 1317	?	Appointed	Thihathu; ?	Son of Uzana I of Pinya
Thihapate II	by 1364	c. 1401	?	Thado Minbya; Swa Saw Ke; Tarabya of Ava; Minkhaung I	
Thihapate III	c. 1401	c. 1441	Appointed	Minkhaung I; Thihathu of Ava; Min Hla of Ava; Mohnyin Thado (1426)	In rebellion (1426–c. 1441)
Thiri Zeya Thura	1441	1472/73 or later	Appointed	Minye Kyawswa I of Ava; Narapati I of Ava; Thihathura of Ava	
...
Min Sit-Tha	by February/March 1502 (Note: Tabaung 863 ME (6 February 1502–7 March 1502))	1524/25 (Note: 886 ME (1524/25))	Son	Narapati II of Ava	Driven out of Taungdwin in 1524/25 by Thado Minsaw of Prome
Prome rule (1524/25–1542)

=== Konbaung period ===
The following is a list of feudal lords who held Taungdwin as their fief. These lords did not have the day-to-day administrative duties, which were handled by a myothugyi (mayor).

Name	Term From	Term Until	Relationship to predecessor(s)	Overlord(s)	Notes
...
Thiri Maha Tilawka Yadana Dewi	30 May 1782 (Note: Thursday, 4th waning of Nayon 1144 ME = 30 May 1782)	?	Appointed	Bodawpaya	Daughter of King Bodawpaya
Bagyidaw	?	1819	Son	Bodawpaya	Lord of the 16 fiefs and Commander of the Southern Cavalry and the Northern Cavalry (Note: The 16 fiefs and the two cavalry regiments include: Sagaing, Ava (Inwa), Yadana Theinga (Shwebo), Myedu, Pyinsala, Nga Singu, Myinsaing, Pinle, Pyinsi, Kyauksauk, Taungdwingyi, Shwegyin; Commander of Southern Cavalry and Northern Cavalry)
Thiri Yadana Sanda Dewi		?	Younger sister		
...

== Gallery ==
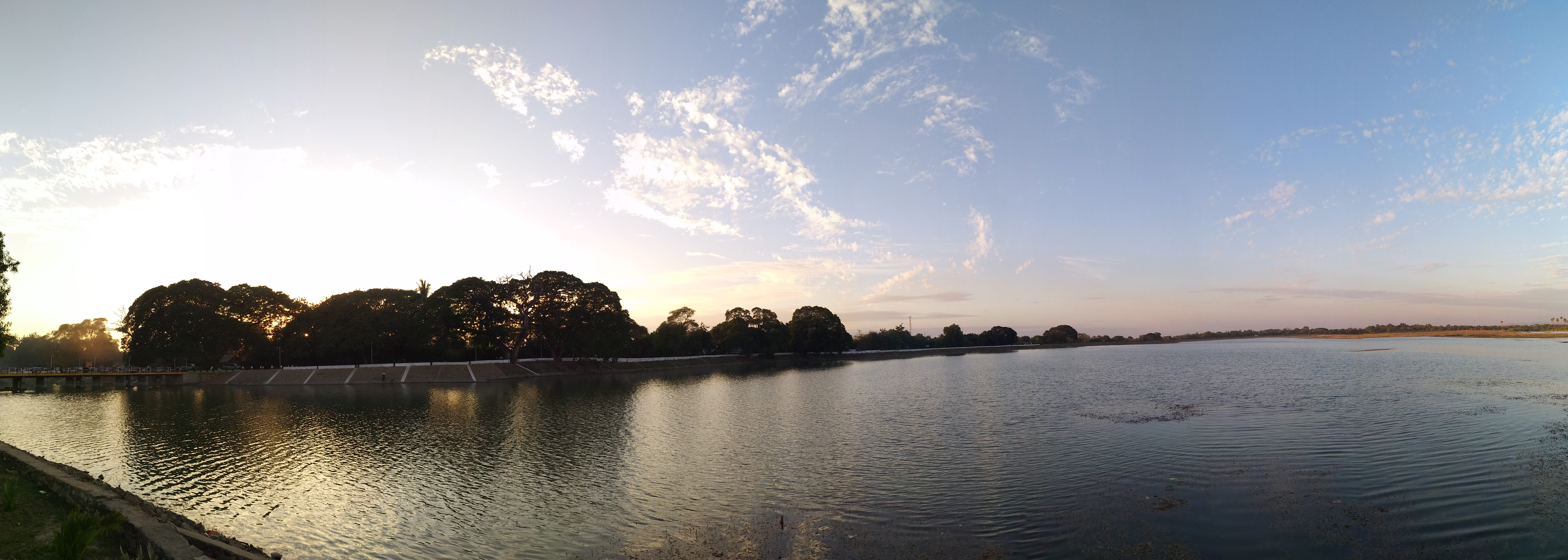
Kandawgyi Lake, Taungdwingyi, Myanmar.

== See also ==
- Taungdwingyi Cultural Museum

== Bibliography ==
- Kala, U (2006) [1724]. Maha Yazawin (in Burmese). Vol. 1–3 (4th printing ed.). Yangon: Ya-Pyei Publishing.
- Maha Sithu (2012) [1798]. Myint Swe; Kyaw Win; Thein Hlaing (eds.). Yazawin Thit (in Burmese). Vol. 1–3 (2nd printing ed.). Yangon: Ya-Pyei Publishing.
- Maung Maung Tin, U (2004) [1905]. Konbaung Set Maha Yazawin (in Burmese). Vol. 1–3. Yangon: Department of Universities History Research, University of Yangon.
- Royal Historical Commission of Burma (2003) [1832]. Hmannan Yazawin (in Burmese). Vol. 1–3. Yangon: Ministry of Information, Myanmar.
