= Saw Pale of Nyaungyan =

Saw Pale စောပုလဲ

Duchess of Nyaungyan
- Born: c. 1360s Nyaungyan
- Died: ?
- Spouse: Saw Diga of Mye-Ne
- Issue: Mohnyin Thado; Nawrahta I of Myedu; Shin Myat Hla of Pakhan
- Father: Saw Mun-Hnit of Nyaungyan
- Mother: unnamed
- Religion: Theravada Buddhism

Saw Pale (Burmese: စောပုလဲ, pronounced [sɔ́ pəlɛ́]) was the mother of King Mohnyin Thado of Ava. She was a great-granddaughter of King Kyawswa I of Pinya from her father's side. Her descendants became kings of Ava down to 1527. She was also a nine-times great-grandmother of King Alaungpaya of the Konbaung dynasty.

== Bibliography ==
- Htin Aung, Maung (1967). A History of Burma. New York and London: Cambridge University Press.
- Letwe Nawrahta and Twinthin Taikwun (c. 1770). Hla Thamein (ed.). Alaungpaya Ayedawbon (in Burmese) (1961 ed.). Ministry of Culture, Union of Burma.
- Royal Historical Commission of Burma (1832). Hmannan Yazawin (in Burmese). Vol. 1–3 (2003 ed.). Yangon: Ministry of Information, Myanmar.

Saw Pale of Nyaungyan Ava Kingdom Born: c. 1360s Died: ?
Royal titles
Preceded by	Duchess of Nyaungyan	Succeeded by
