= Saw Diga of Mye-Ne =

Saw Diga စောဒီကာ

Governor of Mye Ne
- Born: c. 1360s
- Spouse: Saw Pale of Nyaungyan
- Issue: Mohnyin Thado; Nawrahta of Myedu; Shin Myat Hla of Pakhan
- Father: Min Pale of Paukmyaing
- Mother: Shwe Einthe of Paukmyaing
- Religion: Theravada Buddhism

Saw Diga (Burmese: စောဒီကာ, pronounced [sɔ́ dìgà]) was the father of King Mohnyin Thado of Ava. He was a 14th-century governor of Mye-Ne (present-day Nyaung U in central Myanmar). His descendants became kings of Ava down to 1527. He was also a nine-times great-grandfather of King Alaungpaya of the Konbaung dynasty.

== Ancestry ==
The following is his ancestry according to the Alaungpaya Ayedawbon chronicle. Note that his two times great-grandmother Pwa Gyi was a daughter of King Uzana of Pagan, and his two times great-grandfather Yanda Pyissi was a son of Yazathingyan, the chief minister of Pagan.

Ancestry of Saw Diga

16. Min Pe Gyi
8. Min Pe Nge of Myittha
17. Pwa Gyi of Pagan
4. Yandathu of Lanbu
18. Yanda Pyissi
9. Khin Hpone
19. unnamed
2. Min Pale of Paukmyaing
20. Kyawswa of Pagan
10. Uzana I of Pinya
21. Mi Saw U
5. Mway Medaw of Lanbu
22. Kyawswa of Pagan
11. Atula Maha Dhamma Dewi of Pinya
23. Saw Soe
1. Diga
24. Theinkha Bo
12. Thihathu
25. Lady Myinsaing
6. Kyawswa I of Pinya
26. Narathihapate
13. Mi Saw U
27. Shin Shwe
3. Shwe Einthe of Paukmyaing
28. Kyawswa of Pagan
14. Saw Hnit of Pagan
29. Saw Soe
7. Atula Sanda Dewi of Pinya
15. unnamed

== Bibliography ==
- Htin Aung, Maung (1967). A History of Burma. New York and London: Cambridge University Press.
- Letwe Nawrahta and Twinthin Taikwun (c. 1770). Hla Thamein (ed.). Alaungpaya Ayedawbon (in Burmese) (1961 ed.). Ministry of Culture, Union of Burma.
- Royal Historical Commission of Burma (1832). Hmannan Yazawin (in Burmese). Vol. 1–3 (2003 ed.). Yangon: Ministry of Information, Myanmar.

Saw Diga of Mye-Ne Ava Kingdom Born: c. 1360s Died: ?
Royal titles
| Preceded by | Governor of Mye-Ne | Succeeded by |
