= Alaungpaya Ayedawbon =

Burmese historical chronicle

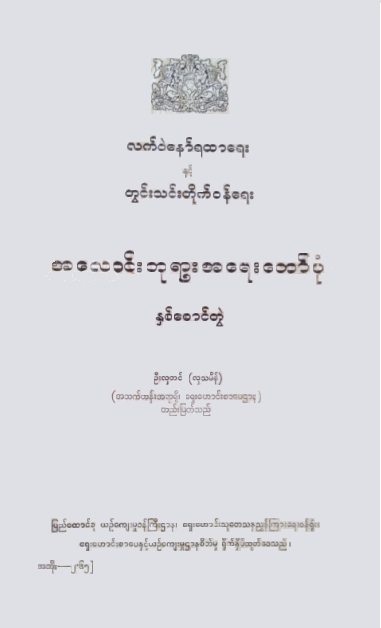
- Cover of 1961 publication of both versions
- Author: Letwe Nawrahta or Twinthin Taikwun Maha Sithu
- Original title: အလောင်းဘုရား အရေးတော်ပုံ
- Language: Burmese
- Series: Burmese chronicles
- Genre: Chronicle, History
- Publication date: 1752–1760; 1883 (first publication)
- Publication place: Kingdom of Burma

Alaungpaya Ayedawbon (Burmese: အလောင်းဘုရား အရေးတော်ပုံ), also known as Alaung Mintayagyi Ayedawbon (Burmese: အလောင်း မင်းတရားကြီး အရေးတော်ပုံ), is one of two biographic chronicles of King Alaungpaya of Konbaung Dynasty. Both versions trace the king's life from his purported ancestry from King Sithu II of Pagan Dynasty down to his death from an illness from his campaign against Siam in 1760. Both contains many details, though not all the same, of the king's 8-year reign.

== Names ==
The first published version in 1883 was named Alaungpaya Ayedawbon but subsequent editions of the chronicle were titled Alaungpaya Ayedawbon or Alaung Mintayagyi Ayedawbon. Confusion arose when the second version was published for the first time in 1961, together with the first version. They both were published under the name Alaung Mintayagyi Ayedawbon.

== Authorship ==
Scholarship agrees that both chronicles are contemporary accounts of the king by his ministers but does not agree on the authorship. Both versions were kept at the Royal Library of the last two Konbaung kings, Mindon and Thibaw. According to U Yan, the Royal Librarian, one version is by Letwe Nawrahta and the other is by Twinthin Taikwun Maha Sithu. One of the versions was published in 1883, and again in 1900 as Alaungpaya Ayedawbon.

The first two publications did not explicitly state the author's name, leaving it as "a wise man from the time of Alaungpaya". When it was published again together with other chronicles in 1923, the authorship was attributed to Twinthin Taikwun Maha Sithu. But colonial period historians Pe Maung Tin and Maung Maung Gyi both later corrected the author to Letwe Nawrahta. However, more recent scholars Hla Thamein (the editor of the 1961 publication of both versions), Yi Yi and Kyauk Taing all say the 1883 version was written by Twinthin Taikwun, while Thaw Kaung sides with earlier historians, and says it was Letwe Nawrahta.

== Bibliography ==
- Thaw Kaung, U (2010). Aspects of Myanmar History and Culture. Yangon: Gangaw Myaing.
- Letwe Nawrahta and Twinthin Taikwun (c. 1760). Hla Thamein (ed.). Alaungpaya Ayedawbon (in Burmese) (1961 ed.). Ministry of Culture, Union of Burma.
