= Twinthin Taikwun Maha Sithu =

Burmese statesman and historian

Twinthin Taikwun Maha Sithu (1726-1806), also known as U Tun Nyo or U Nyo, was a Burmese historian and government minister. He compiled the Yazawin Thit.

== Early life ==
Twinthin Taikwun Maha Sithu was born U Tun Nyo in 1726 in Maung Htaung, a town in northwest Burma. He trained to become a monk, becoming one at the age of 20 and being given the title of Shin Lingathara. As a monk, he wrote poetry and dhammasattha texts. When he was 26, Twinthin Taikwun Maha Sithu abandoned his life as a monk, having fallen in love with a regular to his monastery. Getting married, he traveled with his new wife to the capital of Burma to find work at the court of King Alaungpaya.

During his monkhood, Twinthin Taikwun Maha Sithu was the teacher of the only guardian of Śāsana in the realm, Nanabhivamsa, who came from the same village as him. When Twinthin Taikwun Maha Sithu eventually became a government minister, Nanabhivamsa's loyalty to the throne was increased.

== Court official ==
Twinthin Taikwun Maha Sithu was given the job of being a tutor to the prince who would later become King Bodawpaya, who gave him the title of Maha Thinkhayar and then Maha Sithu as well as the position of Twinthin Taikwun upon his coronation. Twinthin Taikwun Maha Sithu, the most powerful Maha Sithu, acted as a key advisor to the new king. In 1793, he was tasked with the job of restoring the stone inscriptions from monasteries across the realm. One theory for how he took up an interest with Burmese history is that upon seeing contradicting historical information on the stones and in the Maha Yazawin, he reported them to the king, who called on him to make a new national chronicle based on the sources of the stones. He thus wrote the Yazawin Thit between 1780 and 1794.

Twinthin Taikwun Maha Sithu also wrote a biography of the life of the King Alaungpaya called Alaungpaya Ayedawbon.

Twinthin Taikwun Maha Sithu died in 1806 at Mingun, having followed the king during the construction of the pagoda there.
