= Kyaukthittar Pagoda =

Buddhist temple in Kyaukse, Myanmar

- Location within Myanmar

Religion
- Affiliation: Theravada Buddhism

Location
- Location: Kyaukse, Mandalay Region
- Country: Myanmar
- Coordinates: 21°36′7.28″N 96°8′43.01″E

Architecture
- Founder: Alaungsithu or Swa Saw Ke
- Groundbreaking: 11th century or 14th century

Specifications
- Length: around 60 feet
- Width: around 60 feet

Kyaukthittar Pagoda (ကျောက်သေတ္တာစေတီ; lit. 'The Stone Chest Pagoda') is a stone-based Buddhist stupa situated at an elevation of approximately 350 feet on the slope of Kyaukse Hill in Myanmar. The pagoda is constructed atop a large rock formation that resembles the famous Kyaiktiyo Pagoda. The stone has a circumference of about 60 feet. Its stone base and elevated position make it a notable religious and cultural site in the region.

== History ==
The Kyaukse Yazawin (ကျောက်ဆည်မှတ်တမ်း) records that King Alaungsithu of the Pagan dynasty (r. 1113–1167) ordered the construction of the pagoda after a divine omen. During his royal tour, while paying homage to the Shwethalyaung Pagoda, he witnessed a miraculous sign—the sacred rays of Buddha relics paused and rested upon the legendary stone chest. Interpreting this as a divine message, the king declared, "At this sacred spot where the relics have manifested, I shall build a pagoda to honor my faith," and proceeded to erect the stupa directly atop the relic chest.

An alternative account suggests that the pagoda was constructed in the 14th century by King Swa Saw Ke (r. 1367–1400), a monarch of the Ava Kingdom. Initially, the stupa and the stone were white, but they were later gilded and are now venerated as a golden-hued stone. It is said that although the pagoda originally stood at 9 taung (approximately 4.5 meters) when first built, subsequent devotees and merit-seekers gradually renovated and expanded the structure to its current height of 13 taung (about 6.5 meters) over time.

The pagoda was damaged, and the casket pagoda tilted approximately 30 degrees following the powerful 2025 Myanmar earthquake. Due to the risk of the stone chest pagoda collapsing from the impact, the local government planned its demolition using dynamite and urgently notified nearby residents to evacuate the area to prevent any potential harm.

On April 15, 2025, Senior General Min Aung Hlaing, Prime Minister of Myanmar, visited the pagoda to inspect its condition. He issued directives to preserve the sacred site without resorting to demolition or the use of explosives, instead recommending structural reinforcement using poured concrete.

== Legend ==
According to tradition, in ancient times, local villagers would visit the great stone chest during festivals and celebrations. They could borrow gold, silver, and jeweled ornaments stored inside the chest to wear during the festivities. After the events concluded, the treasures had to be returned and placed back into the stone chest. It is said that the people strictly honored this practice as a sacred vow (ကတိသစ္စာ), ensuring the treasures remained protected for future Buddha Maitreya. However, due to human greed, the local villagers failed to return the treasures, and as a result, the stone chest was forever locked.

According to local folklore, there was a time when the great stone chest stood slightly open. A young herdboy, upon glimpsing the gold, silver, and jeweled treasures inside, was overcome with greed and attempted to steal them. Miraculously, the stone chest slammed shut on its own, severing the boy’s hand and thwarting the theft.

== Story from Manusari novel ==
Min Thein Kha's celebrated novel Manusari (မနုစာရီ) draws from the legends surrounding Kyaukthittar Pagoda. The story centers on Manusari, a sage and legal scholar who is eventually appointed as the chief judge of the Thettha Kingdom (believed to correspond to present-day Pandaung or Minbu).

She falls in love with Atida, the crown prince, which sparks the jealousy of his consort, Batda Kalaya. Batda Kalaya makes several attempts to discredit Manusari but fails. Eventually, she abandons her rivalry and becomes one of Manusari's students. However, during a war campaign led by Prince Atida, Batda Kalaya seizes the opportunity to accuse Manusari of being a witch, convincing King Thakayit to order her arrest.

Following the arrest, Batda Kalaya assumes the role of chief judge and presides over Manusari's trial. In a display of jealousy and injustice, she sentences Manusari to have her right hand severed and orders her imprisonment. In an attempt to destroy the severed hand, Batda Kalaya casts it into a furnace, but the act causes a massive explosion that engulfs the kingdom in flames.

When Prince Atida returns from battle, he finds the kingdom in ruins and discovers Manusari's severed hand. He preserves it along with his treasures in a great stone chest and ultimately takes his own life. The novel later identifies the location of the stone chest as Kyaukse. It is believed by locals that Manusari remains at Kyaukthittar Pagoda, guarding it to this day.
