= Eleven Agricultural Districts =

Administrative divisions in medieval Burma

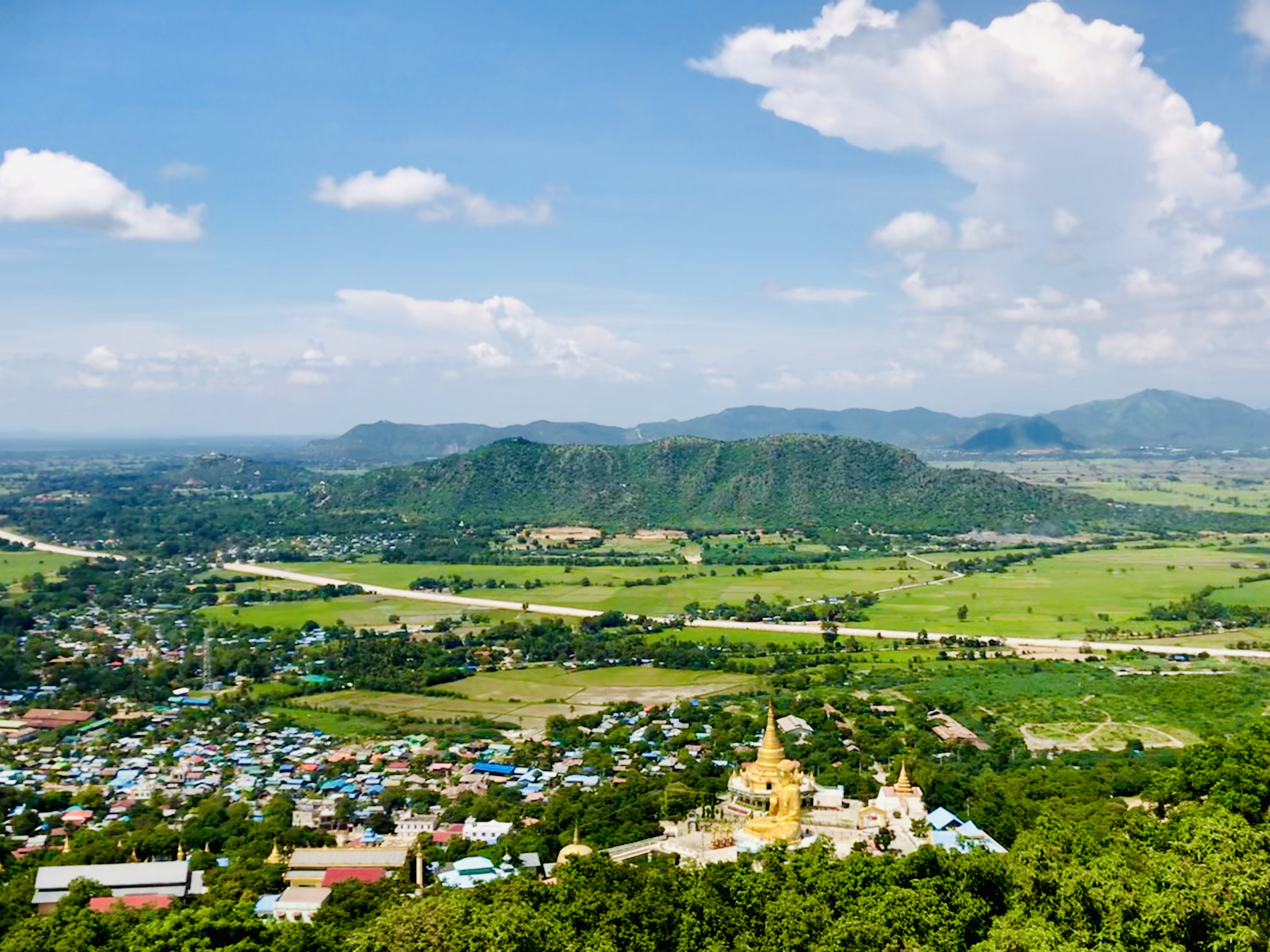
Kyaukse Plain

The Eleven Agricultural Districts (Burmese: လယ်တွင်း ဆယ့်တစ်ခရိုင်) were a historic agricultural administrative division established during the reign of King Anawrahta (r. 1044–1077), the founder of the First Burmese Empire. Located in the modern-day Kyaukse district in Mandalay Region, these districts served as the heartland of rice cultivation and irrigation development in medieval Burma (now Myanmar), playing a crucial role in the growth and centralization of the Pagan state. This fertile districts became the "Granary of Pagan", ensuring food security for the empire.

== Geographical composition ==
The Eleven Agricultural Districts encompassed areas that now fall within three present-day townships in the Dry Zone: the eastern part of Myittha Township, the western part of Kyaukse Township, and portions of Sintgaing Township. Geographically, the region extended from the southern foothills of Pyetkhaywe Mountain to the Dutthawadi River in the north, and from the eastern edge of the Shan Hills to the Samone River in the west. Positioned between these major river systems, the area offered optimal conditions for the establishment of extensive irrigation networks initiated by King Anawrahta, aimed at enhancing large-scale rice production.

The specified area lies between latitudes 21°17′N and 21°47′N, and longitudes 96°01′E and 96°10′E.

== History ==
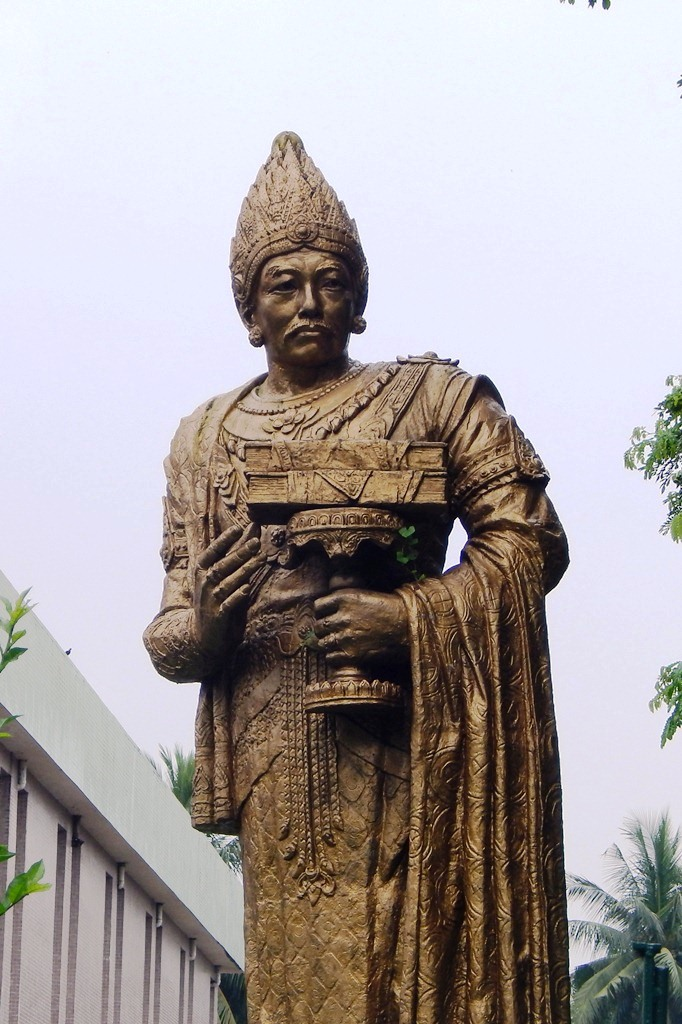
King Anawrahta, the founder of the first Burmese empire.

King Anawrahta initiated large-scale irrigation projects as part of his broader effort to consolidate power and strengthen the Pagan economy. He ordered the construction of numerous irrigation systems, including dams, reservoirs, and canals throughout the region of present-day Myanmar.

Upon arriving in the southern agricultural plains, Anawrahta ascended Thalyaung Hill to survey the surrounding landscape. From this vantage point, he observed that the waters flowing from Mount Kayut could be dammed to support extensive agricultural activity. Recognizing the potential to improve the livelihoods of countless subjects across the Pagan Empire, he directed the construction of key irrigation works.

Along the Panlaung River, he commissioned the following dams:

- Kintar Dam
- Nganaint Thay Dam
- Pyoungpya Dam
- Gume Dam

Similarly, along the Zawgyi River (also known as the Mekkhaya River), he ordered the construction of:

- Nwartat Dam
- Kunhsay Dam
- Ngapyoung Dam (also known as Gudaw Dam)

Additionally, King Anawrahta established the Eleven Agricultural Districts. These districts were strategically organized to support large-scale rice cultivation and water management.

The eleven agricultural districts were:

- Pinle
- Myitmana
- Myittha
- Myinkhontaing
- Yamon
- Panan
- Mekkhaya
- Tapyattha
- Thindaung
- Tamok
- Khanlu

These eleven districts are also known as the Eleven Myittha Districts. By actively promoting agricultural growth and supporting irrigation efforts, these districts became the kingdom's central granary, serving as the primary storage for food supplies. Successive monarchs appointed officials and laborers to maintain and improve the irrigation canals and weirs, ensuring the region’s agricultural productivity and stability.

Throughout Myanmar's history, the governors of the eleven agricultural districts wielded significant manpower. As a result, Burmese kings consistently favored and safeguarded these districts. Importantly, the major royal capitals of Upper Myanmar were always located in close proximity to or within these agricultural districts.

According to historical accounts, after King Thalun ascended the throne, around 4-5 years into his reign, the kingdom likely faced widespread famine and food shortages. To overcome this crisis, King Thalun moved the royal capital to Ava and subsequently focused on revitalizing the "Letwin Districts" (also known as the Eleven Agricultural Districts).

== Nine Agricultural Districts ==
During the Konbaung period, under the reign of King Bodawpaya, the entire Eleven Agricultural Districts were restructured into nine districts, known as the Nine Agricultural Districts.

On the 8th waxing day of Tawthalin, 1145 ME (1783 CE), King Bodawpaya conducted a kingdom-wide census across all of Burma and had the records stored in the royal treasury.

During this administrative restructuring:

- Myittha district (Panlaung River Basin) was divided into four districts: Sawhla, Pinle, Myittha and Myitmana.
- Kyaukse district (Zawgyi River Basin) was divided into five districts: Myaunghla, Myinkhontaing, Mekkhaya, Panan and Myinsaing.

Together, these formed the Nine Districts (Ko Khayaing), which became the official administrative designation for Kyaukse.

The methods of land taxation and agricultural labor in the Nine Agricultural District varied significantly. Governor's lands (မြို့စားမြေ), temple lands (ကျောင်းဘုရားဝတ်မြေ), and service lands (အစုအမှုထမ်းမြေ) were taxed at 100 kyats per "pai" (a unit of land area), with an additional 25 kyats for scribe fees (ရေးစား) and 1 basket (တင်း) of paddy. Under the lamaing system (contract farming), farmers received 1 pair of oxen, 10 baskets of seed paddy, and 3.5 "pai" (1 pai is equal to 1.75 acres) of land for rent. In return, they were required to deliver 25 baskets of paddy to the royal granary (ကျီတော်).

In the present day, the Kyaukse District is referred to as the Nine Agricultural Districts. It consists of Kyaukse Township, Sintgaing Township, Tada-U Township, and Myittha Township.
