= Kyaukse =

Town in Mandalay Region, Myanmar

Kyaukse ကျောက်ဆည်
- Town
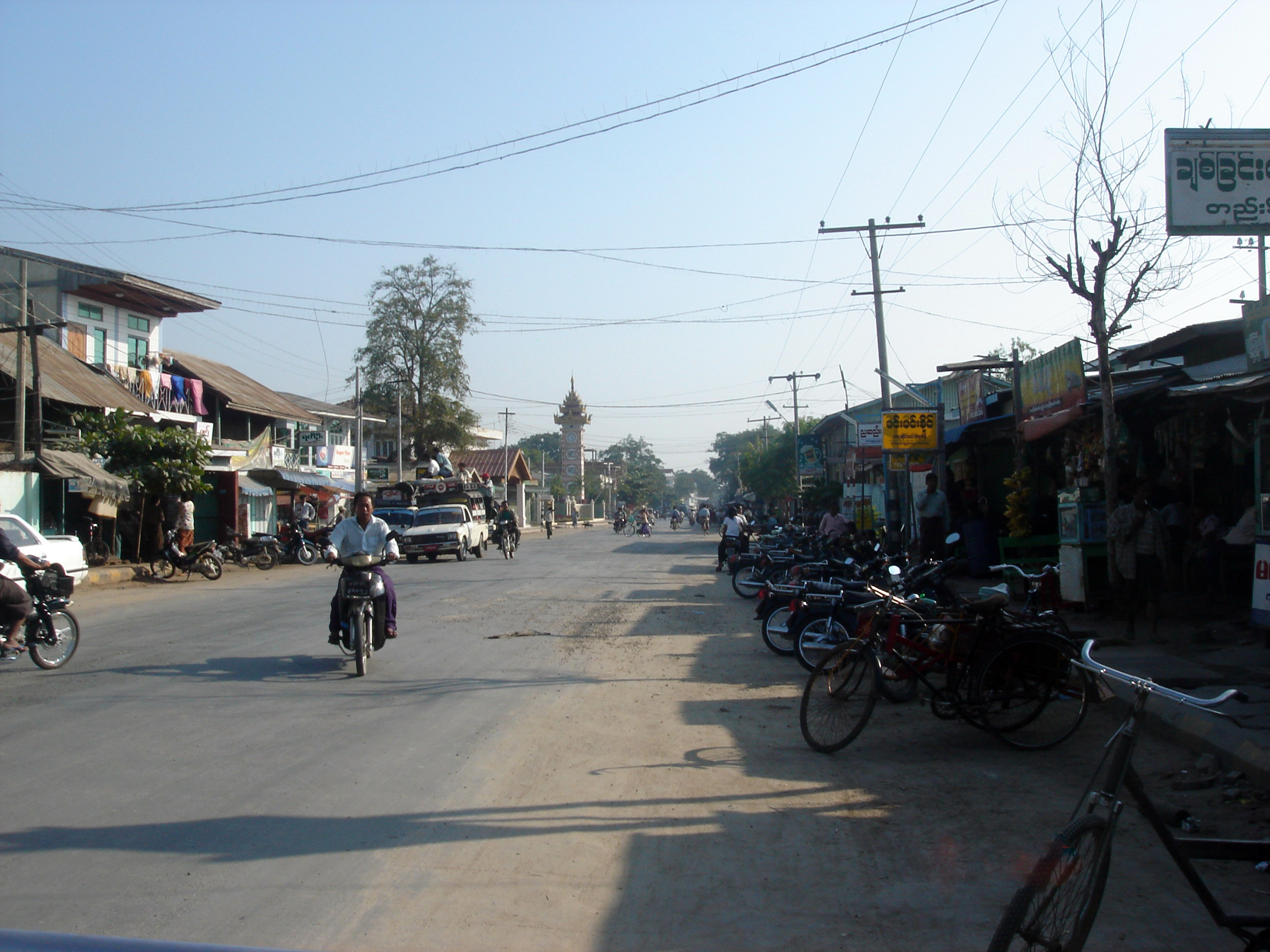
- Downtown Kyaukse, the Main Road, and Clock Tower

- Location in Burma
- Coordinates: 21°36′47″N 96°7′49″E
- Country: Myanmar
- Division: Mandalay Region
- District: Kyaukse District
- Township: Kyaukse Township

Population (2014)
  - Total: 741,071
  - Ethnicities: Burman
  - Religions: Theravada Buddhism
- Time zone: UTC+6.30 (MST)

Kyaukse (Burmese: ကျောက်ဆည် မြို့, pronounced [tɕaʊʔ sʰɛ̀ mjo̰]) is a town and the capital of Kyaukse District in Mandalay Region, Myanmar. Lying on the Zawgyi River, 25 miles (40 km) south of Mandalay, it is served by the Mandalay-Yangon (Rangoon) railway. The first Myanmar probably settled in the area about 800, and local 12th- and 13th-century inscriptions refer to Kyaukse as “the first home”. Remains of pagodas and old cities are found throughout the area. The Shwethalyaung Pagoda, built by King Anawrahta (1044–77), is located in Kyaukse.

Kyaukse is famous for the Kyaukse elephant dance festival, and for being the home town of former dictator Senior General Than Shwe. The town's industrial zone is one of more than 30 across the country.

== Geography ==
The surrounding area consists of a level strip running south from Mandalay along the foothills of the Shan Plateau. The area is located in the heart of Myanmar’s dry zone but is drained by the Panlaung and Zawgyi rivers, which were used for an ancient irrigation-canal system that predates Myanmar settlement in the area.

== History ==
=== Pagan era ===
Kyaukse has been an important area in Myanmar history. It is well irrigated and lush, and has been ever since the Pagan era when it was known as the granary of the kingdom.

King Anawrahta built numerous fortresses along his kingdom's borders, as well as along the rivers flowing within his lands. Tamote was one of nine fortresses along the rivers of Kyaukse region, erected because he needed protection against invasion by water.

The origin of the name "Kyaukse" remains a subject of scholarly debate. During the Pagan dynasty, the Kyaukse Plains were known as "Letwin Satit Khayaing" (လယ်တွင်း ဆယ့်တစ်ခရိုင်; lit. "the Elevn Agricultural Districts"). According to historical records, the name "Kyaukse" (lit. "stone dam") is believed to derive from the stone-reinforced embankments constructed along the Zawgyi River to control flooding and enhance irrigation. An alternative theory suggests that the name originated from one of King Narapati Sithu's (r. 1174–1211) royal irrigation projects—the "Min Ye Dam" (မင်းရဲဆည်), also known as "Kyaukse Taw" (ကျောက်ဆည်တော်, meaning "royal stone dam").

The Eleven Agricultural Districts have held the elephant dance festival since the reign of King Anawrahta, to honor his royal elephants. The origin of the festival dates back to when King Anawrahta of Pagan obtained several Buddhist relics during a trip to China. Upon his return to Pagan, he decided to build a pagoda to house the precious relics. He strapped a replica of the Buddha's teeth to the back of his white elephant, Sinma Yintha, and instructed the elephant to choose a suitable spot for the new pagoda. When the elephant stopped between two hills, named Thalyaung and Pyetkhaywe, the monarch ordered the construction of pagodas on each summit and enshrined the relic at the Shwethalyaung Pagoda. To honor the royal elephants, a festival is held every year at the foot of Shwethalyaung Hill.

=== Konbaung era ===
During the Konbaung dynasty (1752–1885), the Nine Districts of Kyaukse (ကိုးခရိုင် ကျောက်ဆည်) served as a key administrative and agricultural hub. The Kyaukse wun (ကျောက်ဆည်ဝန်, lit. "royal governor") office was established from the reign of King Bodawpaya (r. 1782–1819) onward, with historical records documenting several notable governors.

List of Kyaukse Governors (wuns) by reign,

- King Bodawpaya's Reign (1782–1819): Maha Siri Zeya Thura (မဟာသီရိဇေယျသူရ) and Naymyo Maha Thinkyan (နေမျိုးမဟာသင်္ကြန်)
- King Bagyidaw's Reign (1819–1837): Maha Mingaung Thihathu (မဟာမင်းခေါင်သီဟသူ)
- King Mindon's Reign (1853–1878): Naymyo Minhtin Yan Phyo (နေမျိုးမင်းထင်ရန်ဖြိုး) and Thuye Wungyi Maha Thamein Babyatza U Shwe Lone (သူရဲဝန်ကြီး မဟာသမိန်ဗဗြတ်ဇ ဦးရွှေလုံး)
- King Thibaw's Reign (1878–1885): U Pe Gyi (ဦးပေကြီး) who is the last recorded Kyaukse wun before British annexation

According to some records, it is noted that the Kyaukse wun's jurisdiction was divided, with the Panlaung River district overseen by the Panlaung Four Districts wun and the Zawgyi River district overseen by the Zawgyi Five Districts wun, both appointed under the Kyaukse wun.

During the late Konbaung period, before the British annexation of Mandalay, Kyaukse served as a vital commercial and transit hub connecting Upper Burma's trade networks. The site of the Mingone Monastery (မင်းကုန်းကျောင်း) was used as the residence of the Kyaukse wun and royal officials. The location of the Kyaukse Municipal Office once housed the royal granaries (ဘုရင့်စပါးကျီကြီးများ) and the residence of the Granary Minister (ကျီဝန်).

=== Modern era ===
Historian Gordon Luce, a leading authority on Burmese history, proposed that the origins of Burmese civilization can be traced to the Kyaukse irrigation zone. He supported the theory known as "Myanmar origins lie in Kyaukse" (မြန်မာအစ ကျောက်ဆည်က) by publishing a research paper titled "Old Kyaukse and the Coming of the Burmans". In it, he suggested that in the 8th century CE, some Nanzhao groups migrated on horseback from southern China, passing through the Yunnan–Shan Highlands before eventually settling in the fertile Kyaukse Plains. However, other Burmese historians, such as Dr. Htin Aung, Phoe Latt and Thein Maung, have disagreed with Luce's claim.

Dr. Than Tun and Gordon Luce also argued that the Mon people, rather than the Pyu, were one of the earliest settled groups in Myanmar. They based this claim on evidence from a Mon-language stone inscription discovered in Poungywa, Kyaukse, which records a Mon monk from Kyaukse requesting permission from the Thathanabaing of Pagan to construct an ordination hall.

When Than Shwe was in power at the head of the military regime, a heavy industrial zone was established in Kyaukse – supposedly to provide employment, though its population is relatively small. Kyaukse Township is now constituted with one town, 10 wards and 223 villages of 87 village-tracts.

== Earthquake ==
Following the powerful 2025 Myanmar earthquake, Kyaukse was one of the most damaged towns. More than 170 people were reported dead, and 732 others were injured.

== Economy ==
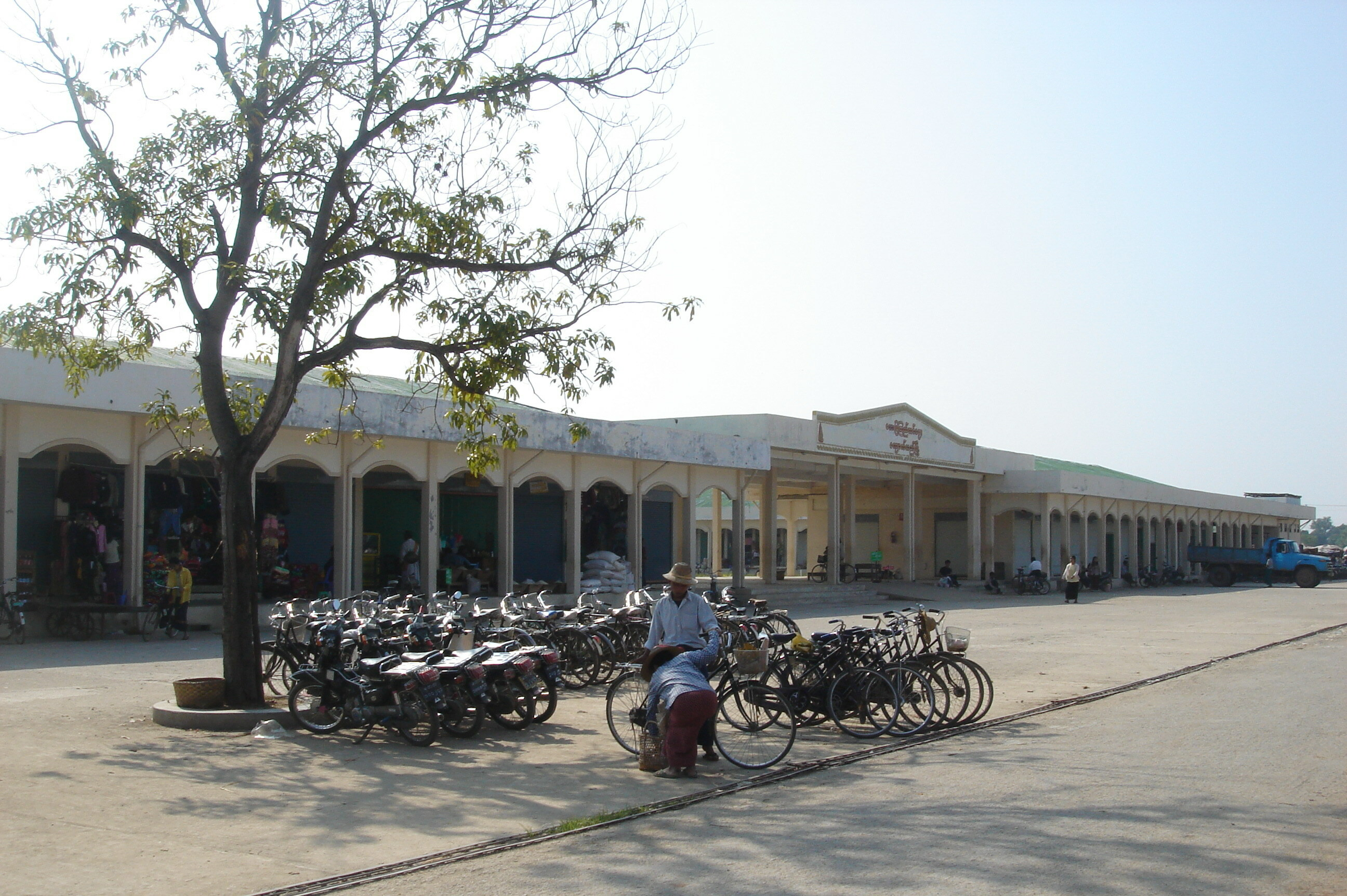
Aye Mya Kyi Lin Market

The Kyaukse area is known for its turmeric, mango and onions. The town has a relatively large shopping centre, Aye Mya Kyi Lin Market.

== Education ==
Kyaukse is home to the

- Basic Education High School No. 1 Kyaukse,
- Basic Education High School No. 2 Kyaukse,
- Basic Education High School No. 3 Kyaukse,
- Technological University, Kyaukse,
- Kyaukse University.

== Notable people ==
- Than Shwe, Myanmar's dictator and Chairman of the State Law and Order Restoration Council
- Saw Tun, a former Minister for Construction of Myanmar
- U Thaung, a former Minister for Science and Technology of Myanmar and former member of parliament in the Pyithu Hluttaw
- Ashin Wirathu, a nationalist Buddhist monk
- Ledwintha Saw Chit, an author
- Shwe Sin, an actress and model
- Than Khe, Chairman of the All Burma Students' Democratic Front (ABSDF)

== Sights of interest ==
- Shwethalyaung Pagoda
- Shwethalyaung Hill
- Kyaukthittar Pagoda
- Maha Shwe Thein Daw Pagoda
- Tamote Shinpin Shwegugyi Temple
- Shinbin Hsat-Thwa Pagoda
- Shwemuhtaw Pagoda
- Laymyethna Pagoda
- Shwe Taung Htee Pagoda
- Shwebontha Pagoda
- Deedok Waterfall
- Sunye Lake
- Shwehylan Taung Pagoda
- Dattaw Taung Cave Pagoda
- Nan Oo Pagoda, Myinsaing

== Gallery ==
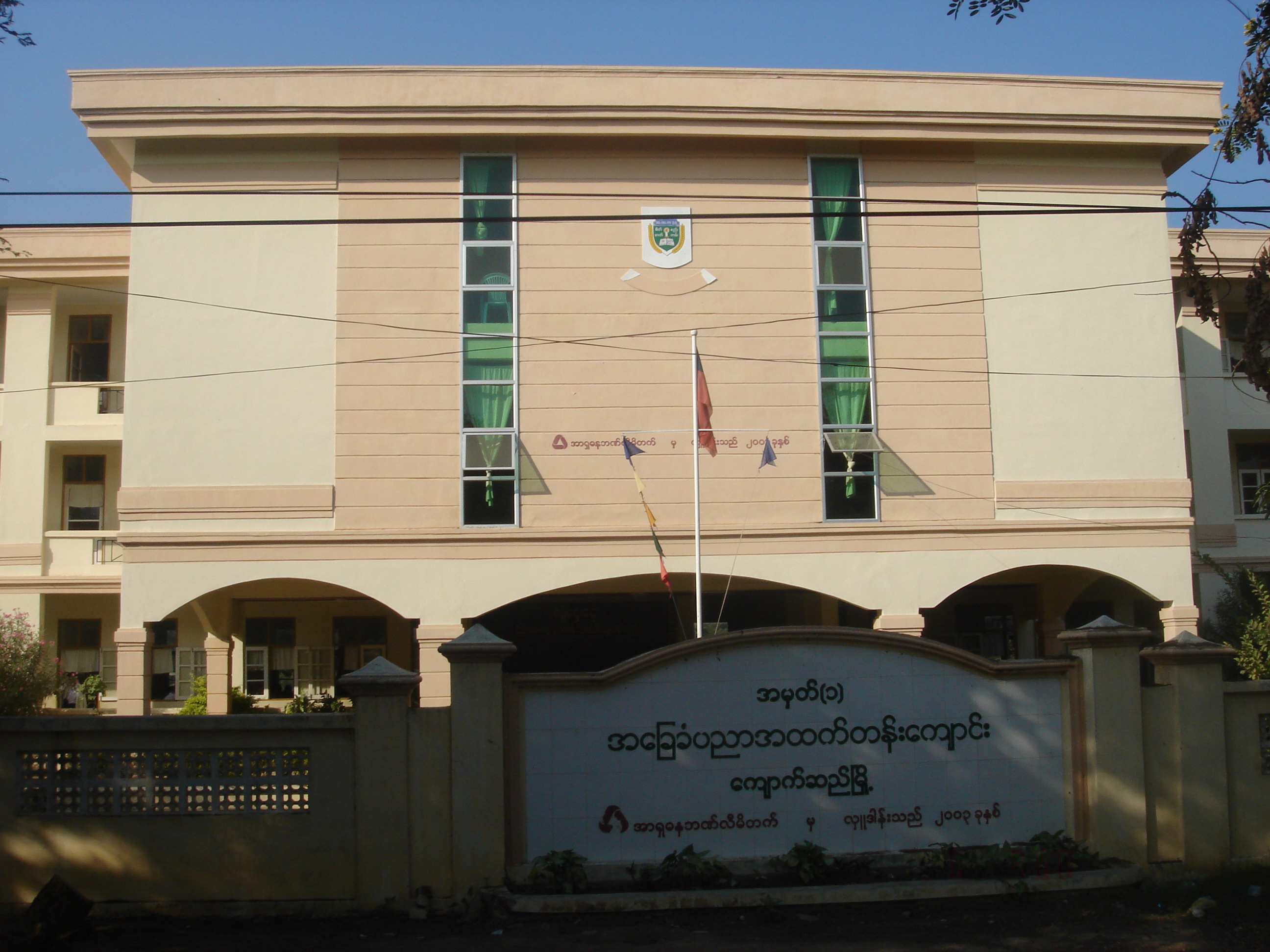
BEHS 1 Kyaukse

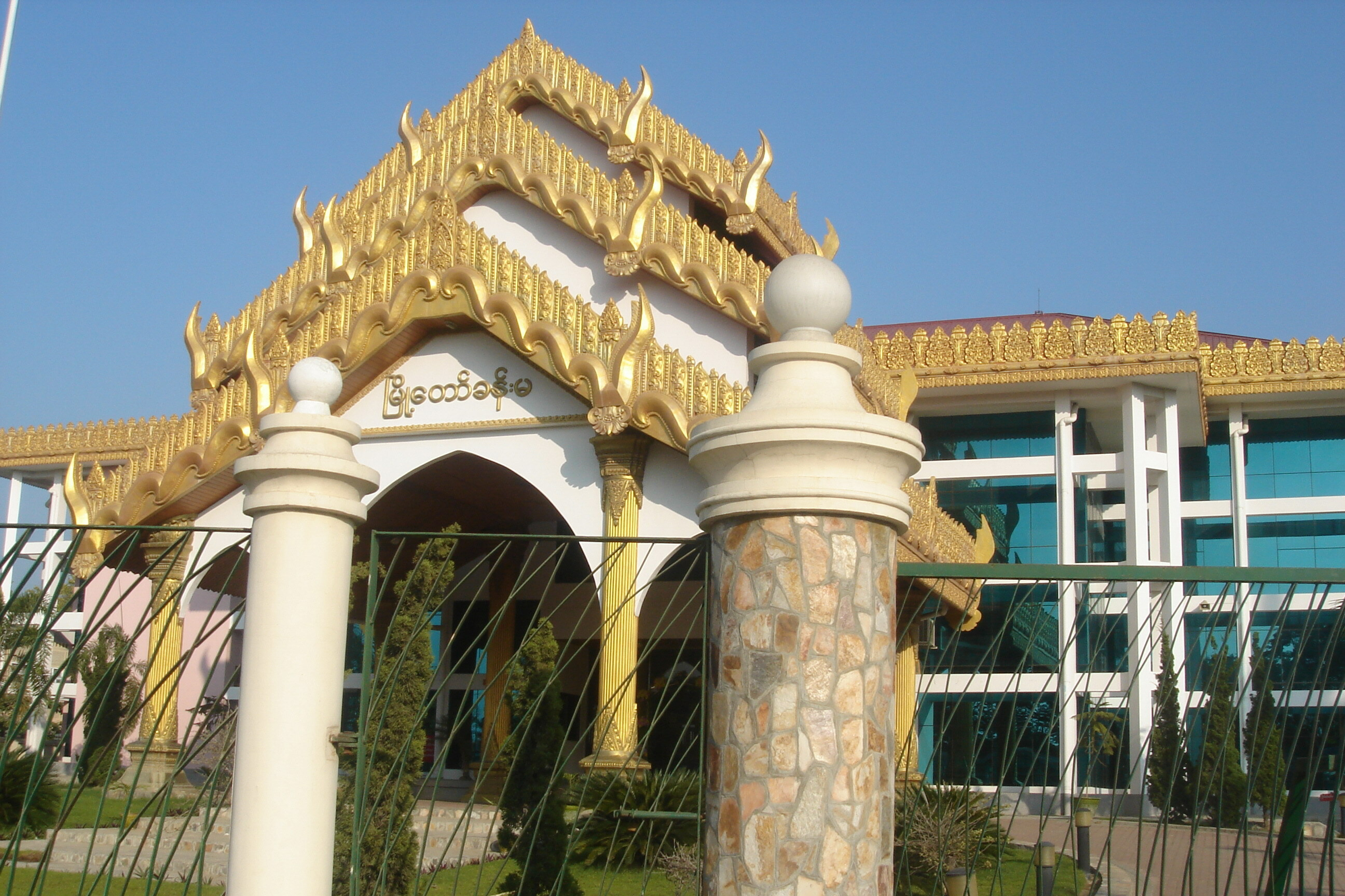
Kyaukse City Hall

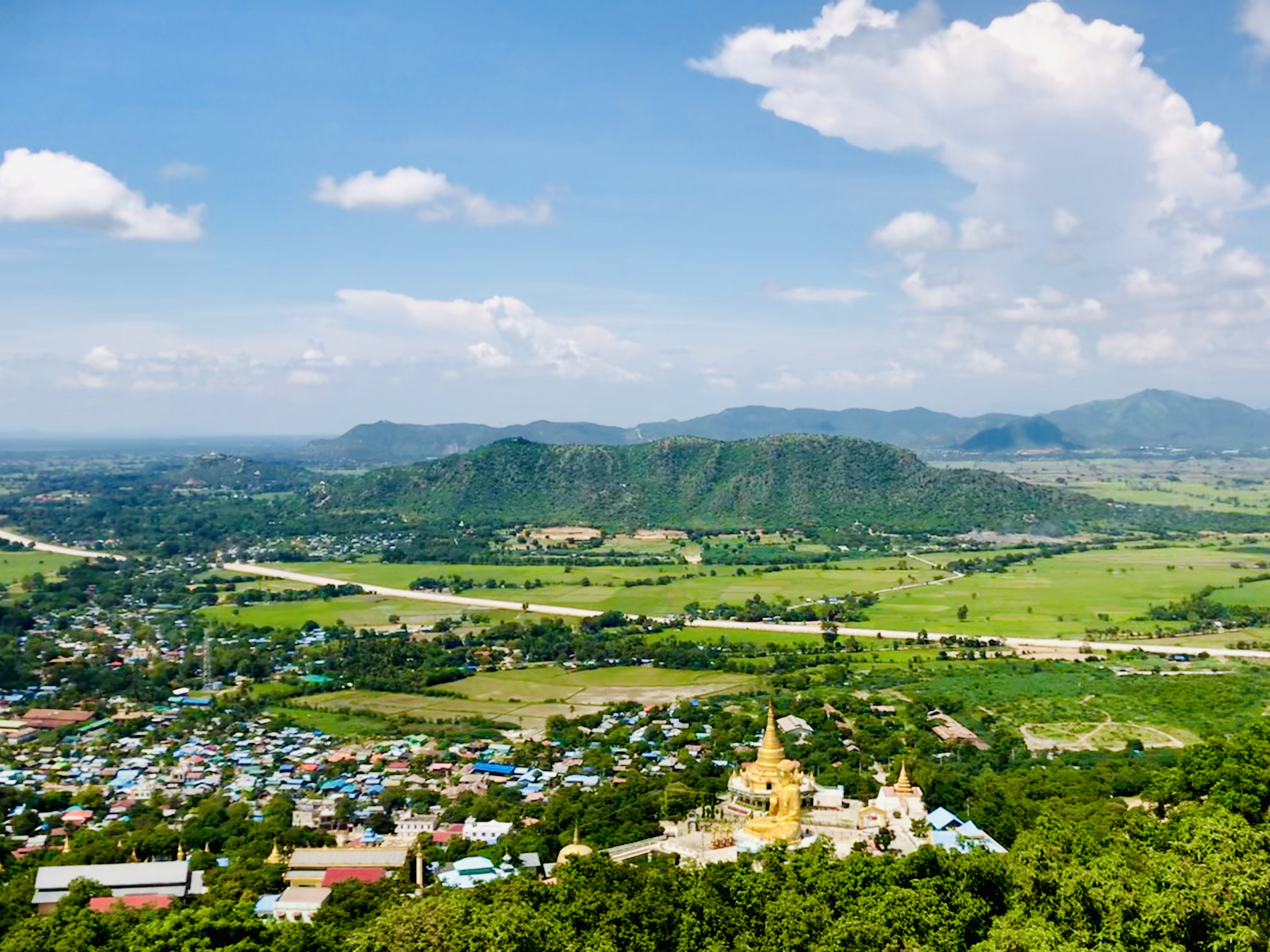
View from Kyaukse hill

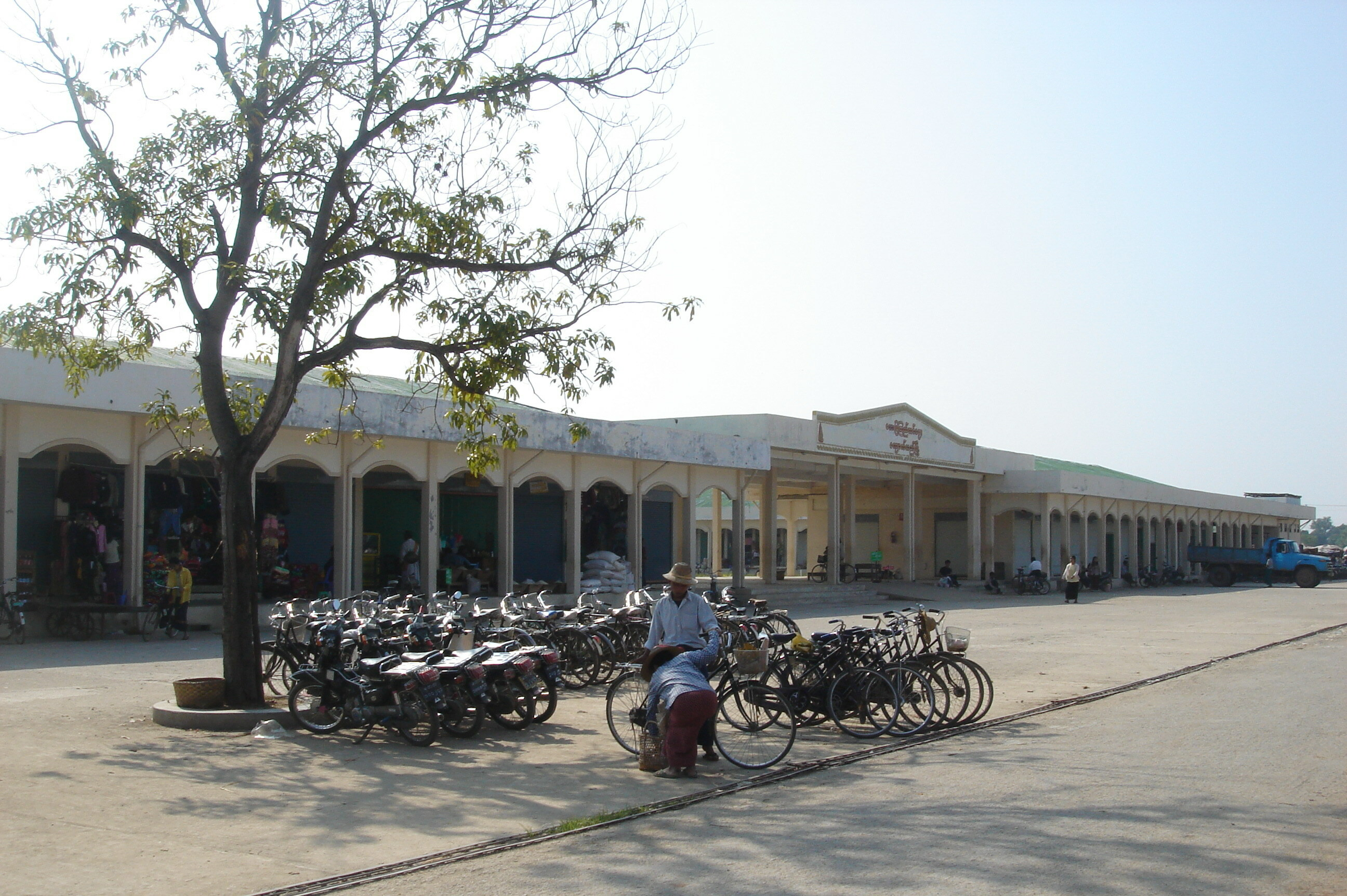
Aye Mya Kyi Lin Market
