= U Thaung (politician) =

Burmese politician (born 1937)

- ဦးသောင်း

Pyithu Hluttaw MP
- In office 31 January 2011 – 29 January 2016
- Preceded by: Constituency established
- Succeeded by: Tin Aung
- Constituency: Kyaukse Township
- Majority: 116,178 (83.99%)

Minister for Science and Technology of Myanmar
- In office 1 November 1998 – 30 March 2011

Ambassador of Burma to the United States
- In office 1991–1996

Personal details
- Born: 6 July 1937 (age 88) Kyaukse, Burma
- Party: Union Solidarity and Development Party
- Spouse: May Kyi Sein

U Thaung (Burmese: ဦးသောင်း) is a Burmese politician who served as Minister for Science and Technology of Myanmar from 1 November 1998 to 30 March 2011. He previously served as an MP in the House of Representatives for Kyaukse Township constituency. He contested the Kyaukse Township in the 2010 Burmese general election and won a seat. However, doubts were raised on the validity of ballot counting and transparency during polling, issues that National Democratic Force candidate Khin Maung Than, reiterated to the Union Election Commission.
