= Kyaukse elephant dance festival =

Kyaukse elephant dance festival (Burmese: ကျောက်ဆည်ဆင်ပွဲ) is an annual major traditional dance festival in Myanmar. It is held is on the day before full moon day of the Burmese lunar month of Thadingyut and the full moon day in Kyaukse, near Mandalay. The festival has been celebrated every year since Pagan period and also grown in popularity among the growing number of foreign tourists visiting Myanmar.

The colourful competition sees teams and individuals wearing elephant costumes perform various traditional dances.

== History ==
King Anawratha of Pagan obtained several Buddhist relics on a trip to China. Upon his return to Pagan, he decided to build a pagoda to house the precious relics. He strapped the replica of the Buddha's teeth to the back of his white elephant Sinma Yintha and told the elephant to choose a suitable spot for the new pagoda. When the elephant stopped in the two hills, named Thalyaung and Pyetkhaywe, the monarch ordered the construction of pagodas on each summit and enshrined the relic at Shwethalyaung Pagoda. To honor the royal elephants a festival is held every year at the foot of Shwethalyaung Hill.

== Held ==
Since the days of King Anawratha, Kyaukse town upon Shwethalyaung Hill has celebrated the elephant dance festival. Traditionally locals don a colourfully decorated, life-size elephant costume, welcoming the end of Thadingyut with a unique array of dance and acrobats. The festival is held every year on the day before full moon day of Thadingut with a total of 29 elephants gracing the stage – 17 traditional, six sequined, and six baby elephants, according to the committee.

A huge elephant figure is made from bamboo and paper. The competition teams from various wards of Kyaukse. Men take their places inside the figure and dance around the town to the accompanied by drums, oboe, cymbals, brass gongs and bamboo clappers. The elephant dancers circles three times at the foot of the hill to pay homage to the Shwethalyaung Pagoda and then compete in front of a panel of judges. It is a dance that requires precise rhythm and timing in order for the elephant dancers to maintain unity inside the elephant figure. People from far and near come to visit Kyaukse and watch the elephant dance.

Awards are given out to each distinct elephant group, for those that show the most convincing and traditional portrayal of the elephant dance. Winners get to take home a sum of cash prizes for their deft performances and hours of training. First-place winners of the traditional elephant contest receive K1 million; second place, K800,000; and third K600,000. Prizes are given out for the sequined and baby elephant competition as well, with financial support from the committee.

On the full moon day, thousands of pilgrims carry small paper elephants 900 feet (275 metres) uphill to the pagoda on top of the Tha Lyaung hill. At the top, they walk around the pagoda three times clockwise and present their donations.
