= Maha Shwe Thein Daw Pagoda =

Buddhist temple in Thin Taung Gyi village

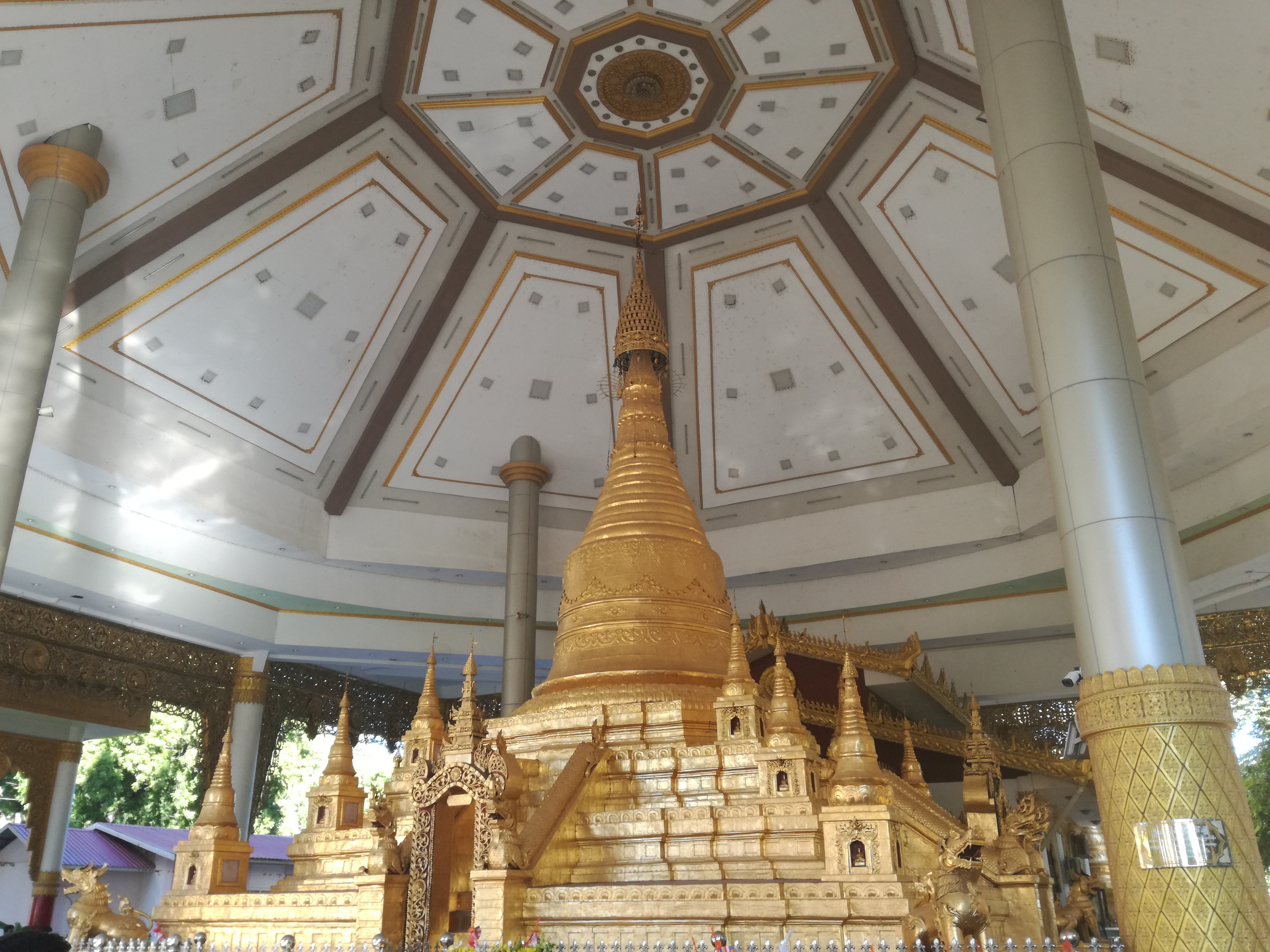
- Maha Shwe Thein Daw Pagoda

- Location within Myanmar

Religion
- Affiliation: Theravada Buddhism

Location
- Location: Kyaukse, Mandalay Region
- Country: Myanmar
- Interactive map of Maha Shwe Thein Daw Pagoda
- Coordinates: 21°38′41.78″N 96°7′51.07″E

Architecture
- Founder: Anawrahta
- Groundbreaking: 11th century

The Maha Shwe Thein Daw Pagoda (Burmese: မဟာ ရွှေသိမ်တော် ဘုရား, also known as the Shwetheindaw Pagoda) is a Buddhist temple in Thindaunggyi village, about two miles north of Kyaukse, Mandalay Region, Myanmar. The Maha Shwe Thein Daw Buddha image is enshrined in this temple, and is believed to grant the wishes of its worshippers. Students from nearby regions come and pray at this pagoda for blessings before their exams.

== History ==
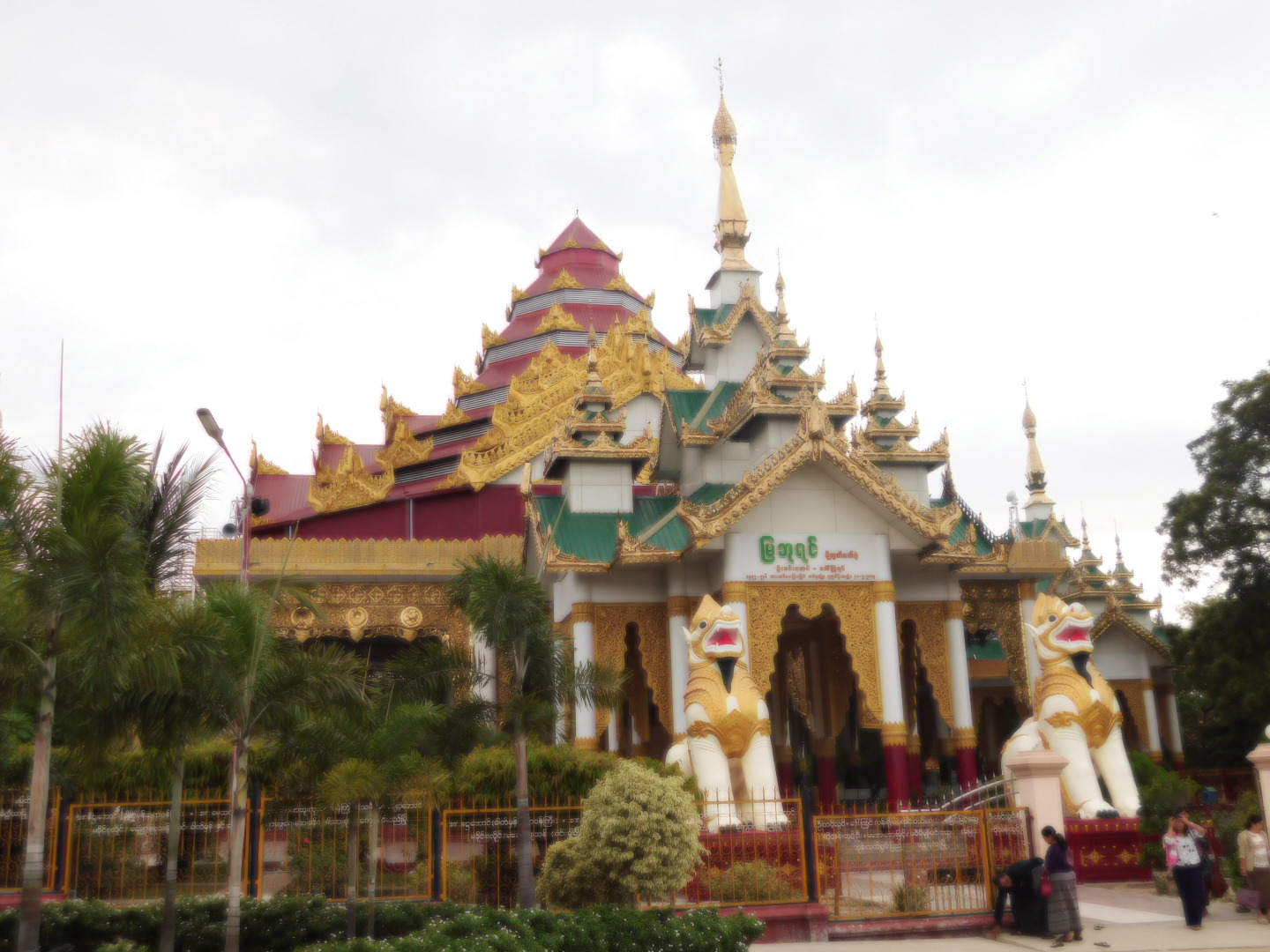
Maha Shwe Thein Daw Pagoda

The Pagoda was built by King Anawrahta of Pagan. Shin Arahan set the consecrated ground for the pagoda. The pagoda was originally named the Shwe Thein Daw by Anawrahta. The board of pagoda trustees renamed it to Maha Shwe Thein Daw. The pagoda used to have an inscription, but the contents of the inscription are no longer known because the inscription was lost when Prime Minister U Nu was in power.

Although the pagoda had been worshipped for generations after Anawrahta, some historians say that the pagoda was covered in bushes about 100 years ago due to the negligence of the villagers. During that time an epidemic hit the village, and those who had fled the village cleared the bushes near the pagoda. Legend says that the clearing of the pagoda keeps the local village clear of epidemics.

== Bibliography ==
- Takahashi, Akio (2024). "Revitalising a Village Through Buddhism: Thindaunggyi Village and Shwetheindaw Paya". Regime Changes and Socio-Economic History of Rural Myanmar, 1986–2019. Singapore: Springer. ISBN 978-981-99-3271-9.
