= Than Khae =

Burmese political leader

Ye Baw Than Khae
- သံခဲ
- Yebaw Than Khe during a 2013 interview with VOA

Chairman of the All Burma Students' Democratic Front
- Incumbent
- Assumed office 10 April 2001
- Preceded by: Dr. Naing Aung

Personal details
- Born: Kyaukse, Burma

Military service
- Allegiance: Myanmar
- Branch/service: All Burma Students' Democratic Front
- Years of service: 1988-

Ye Baw Than Khae (also spelt Than Khe, Burmese: သံခဲ) is the current leader and chairman of the All Burma Students' Democratic Front (ABSDF), an insurgent group based in Kayin State, Myanmar (Burma). He was elected chairman of All Burma Students' Democratic Front on 10 April 2001 at the sixth general conference.

Than Khae signed a state-level ceasefire agreement with Kayin State Government representatives on 5 August 2013. On 10 August 2013, he met with the Union Peace Working Committee (UPWC) and signed the Union-level ceasefire agreement at the Myanmar Peace Center in Yangon.

Than Khae signed the Nationwide Ceasefire Agreement (NCA) as ABSDF's representative with the government of Myanmar on 15 October 2015.

== See also ==
- All Burma Students' Democratic Front
