= Tamote Shinpin Shwegugyi Temple =

Theravada Buddhist temple in Kyaukse

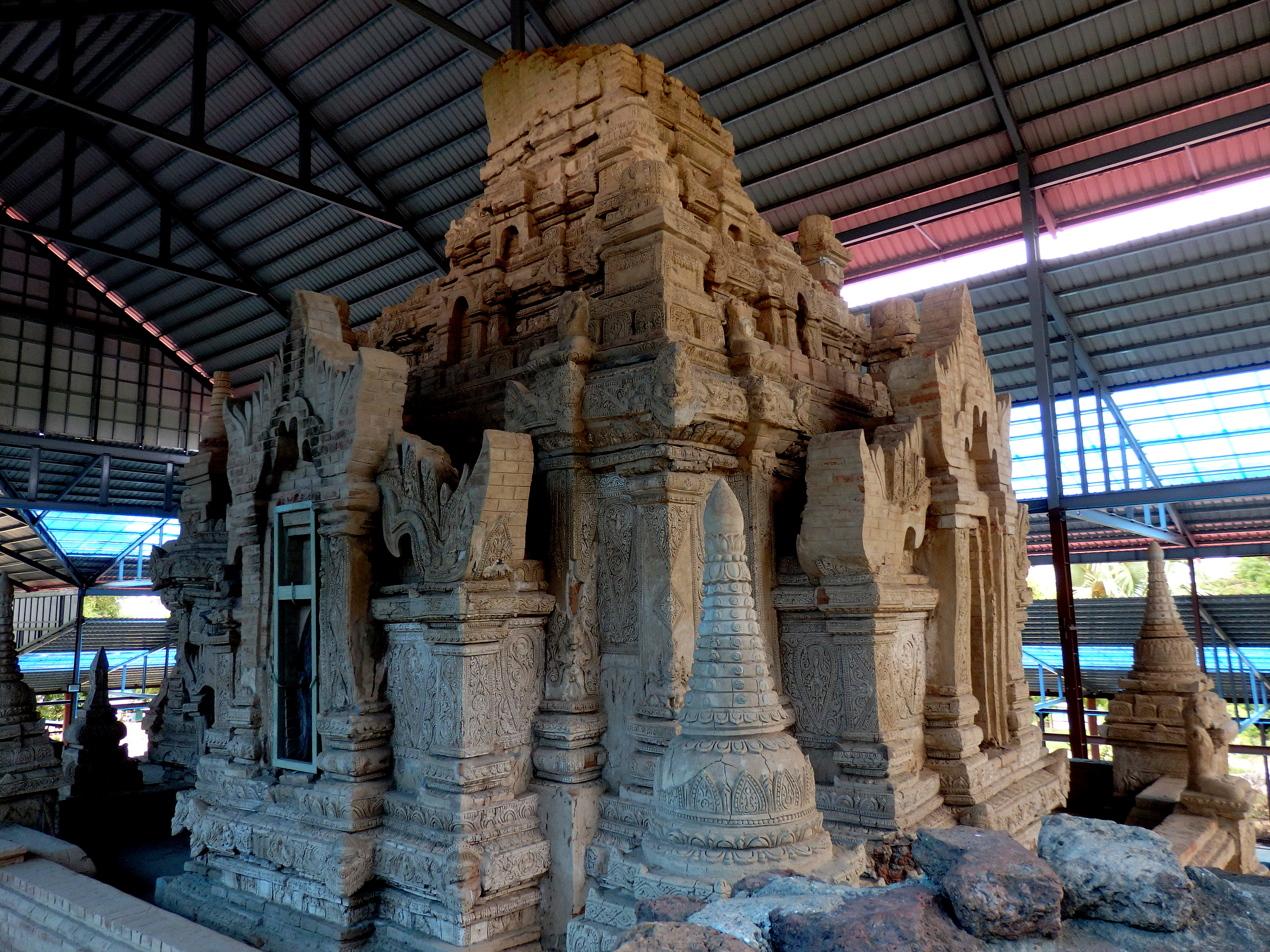
- Tamote Shinpin Shwegugyi Temple

- Location within Myanmar

Religion
- Affiliation: Theravada Buddhism

Location
- Location: Kyaukse, Mandalay Region
- Country: Myanmar
- Coordinates: 21°38′32.7″N 96°03′17.06″E

Architecture
- Founder: Anawrahta
- Groundbreaking: 11th century
- Completed: 14th century

The Tamote Shinpin Shwegugyi Temple (Burmese: တမုတ်ရှင်ပင်ရွှေဂူကြီးဘုရား) is a Buddhist temple in Kyaukse, Mandalay Region, Myanmar. It was originally built by King Anawrahta of Pagan, and the second storey added by King Narapatisithu, and both were encased inside a huge stupa built by King Uzana of the Pinya dynasty. It was one of nine pagodas outside the ancient city that denoted the extent of the Bagan Empire. The pagoda on top of the temple was discovered to be hiding another pagoda inside, which in turn encased a two-storey temple.

== Location ==
The temple is located northwest of Kyaukse on the road leading to the town of Tada-U. It is near Kyaung Pangon and Nyaung Pin Sauk villages.

== History ==
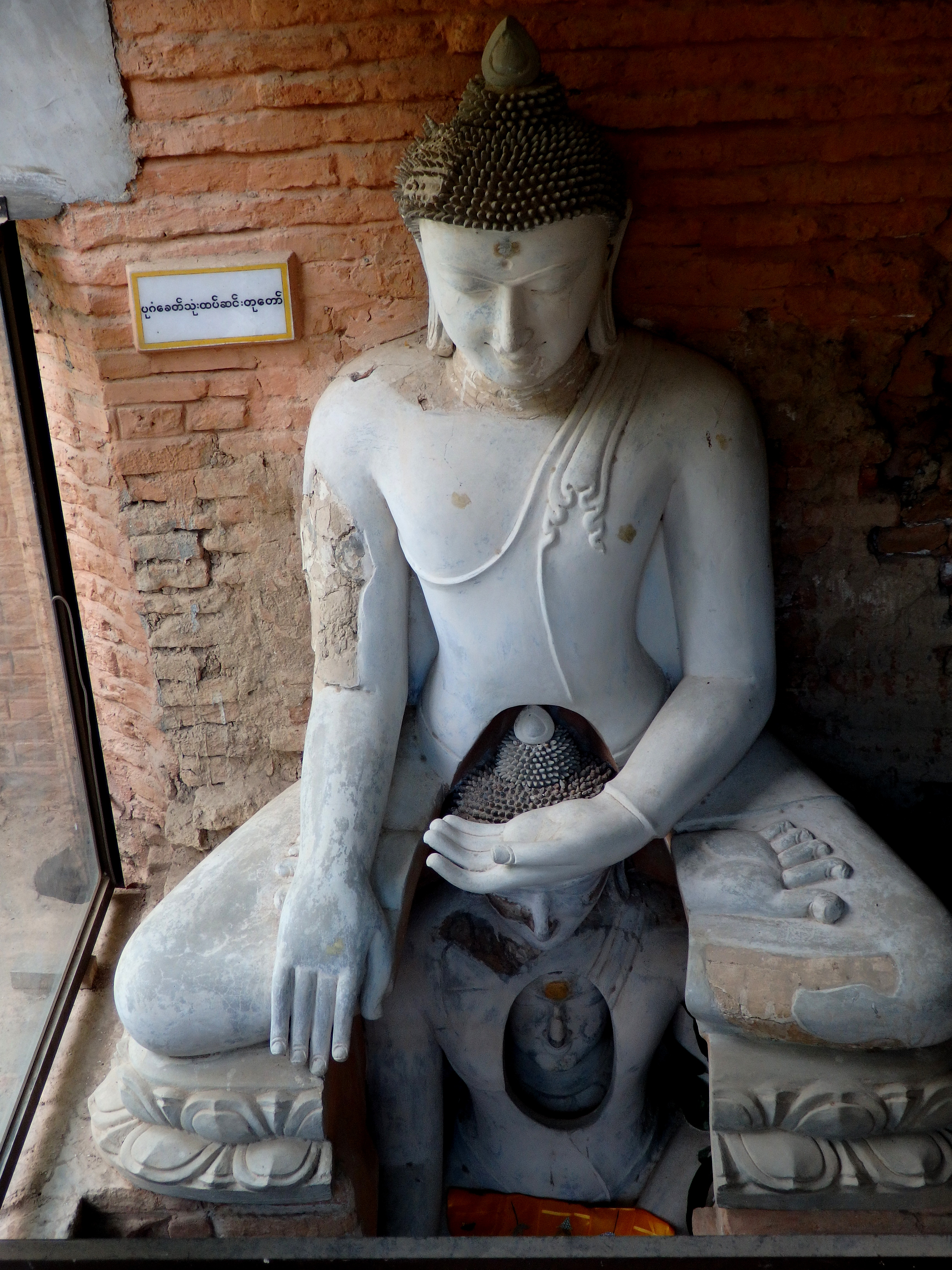
Three encased Buddha images

The first one-storey temple was built by King Anawrahta in the 11th century, and his grandson King Narapatisithu expanded it into a double-storey cave temple decorated with Jataka stories on the upper terrace in the 12th century. Finally, the entire structure was encased in the 14th century by King Uzana, and further protected by nature. Over the years this became hidden underneath a hill, which in 1915 was topped by a new stupa. In 1993 some traces of an ancient brick structure were detected at the foot of the hill, but permission to excavate was only granted in 2008 due to concerns that doing so would damage the encasing stupa.

In 2015, the Ministry of Religious Affairs and Culture designated Tamote Shinpin Shwegugyi Temple as an ancient heritage site of Myanmar.

The pagoda was damaged during the 2025 Myanmar earthquake.

== Gallery ==
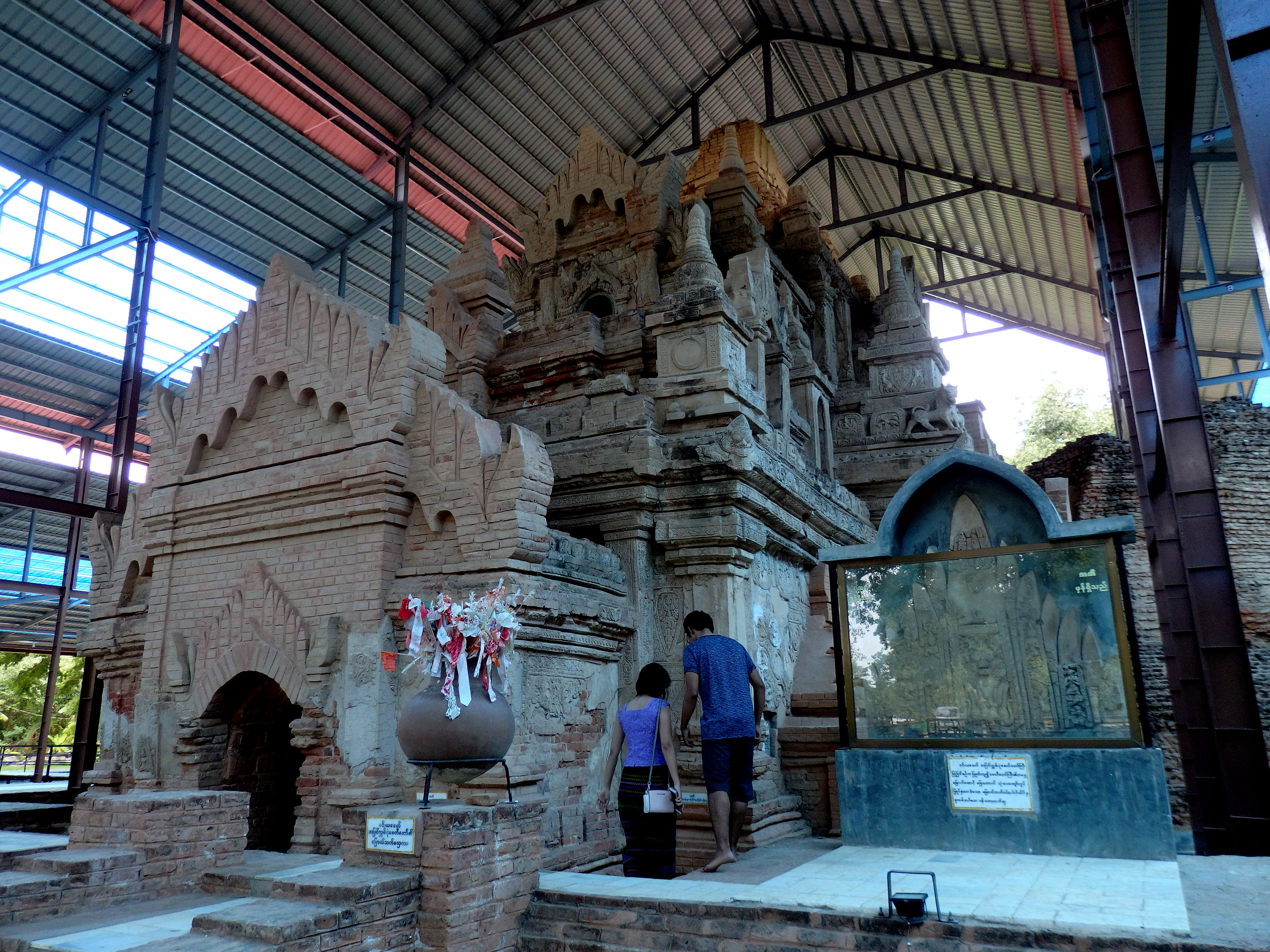
Tamote Shinpin Shwegugyi Temple.

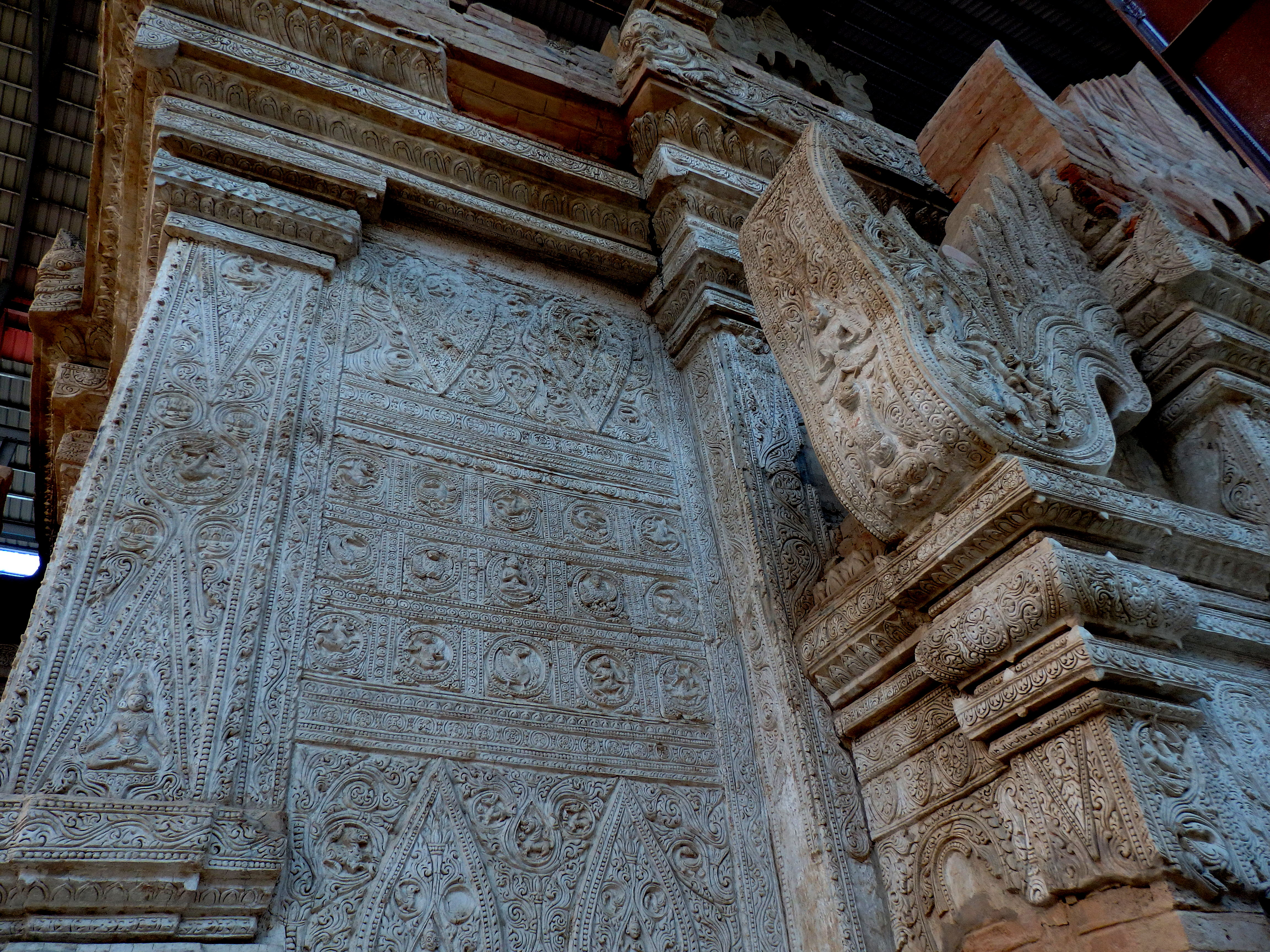
Stone images featuring flora and mythical creature motifs in relief, similar in craftsmanship to those found in Bagan.

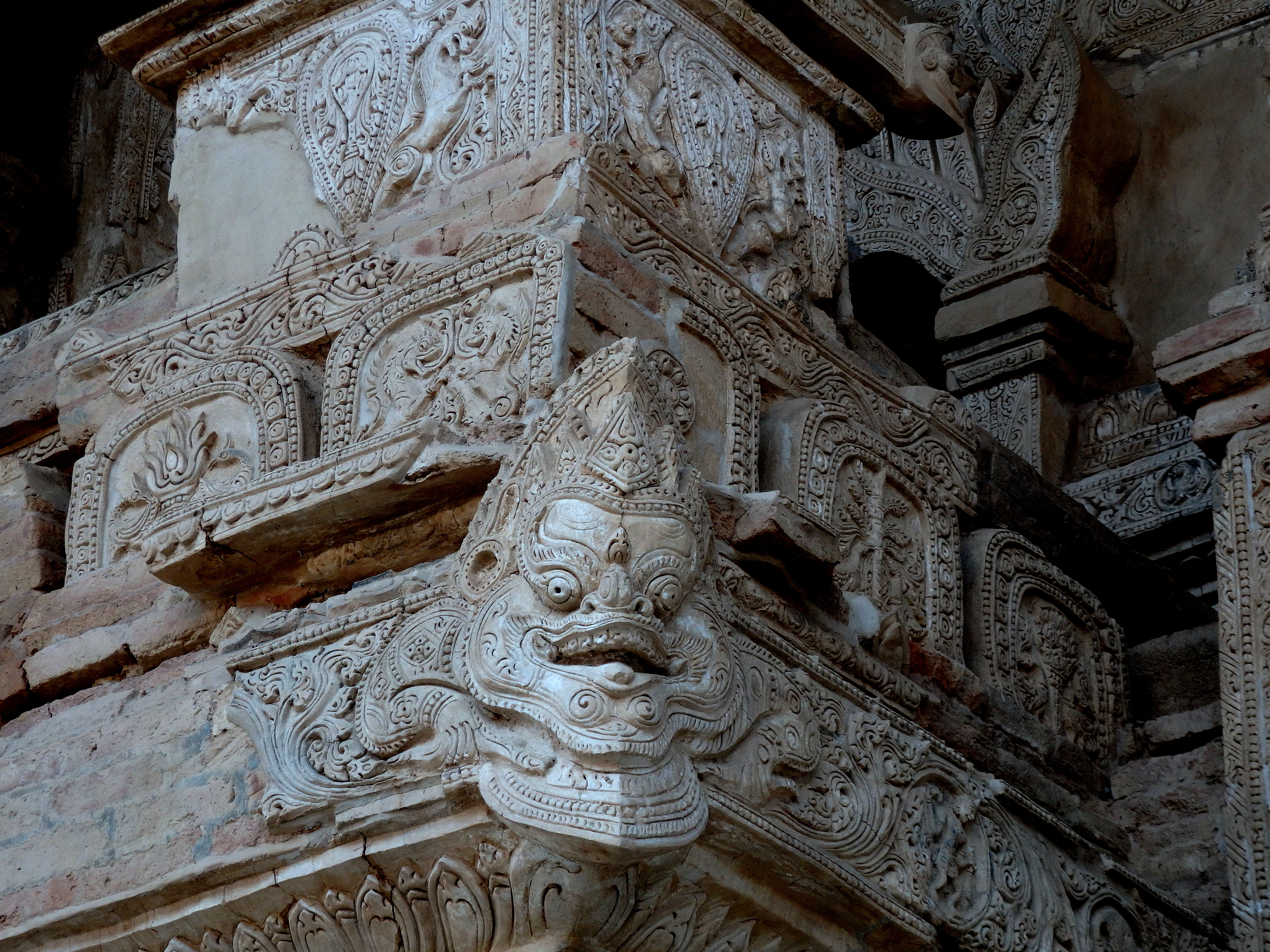
Stone-carved images

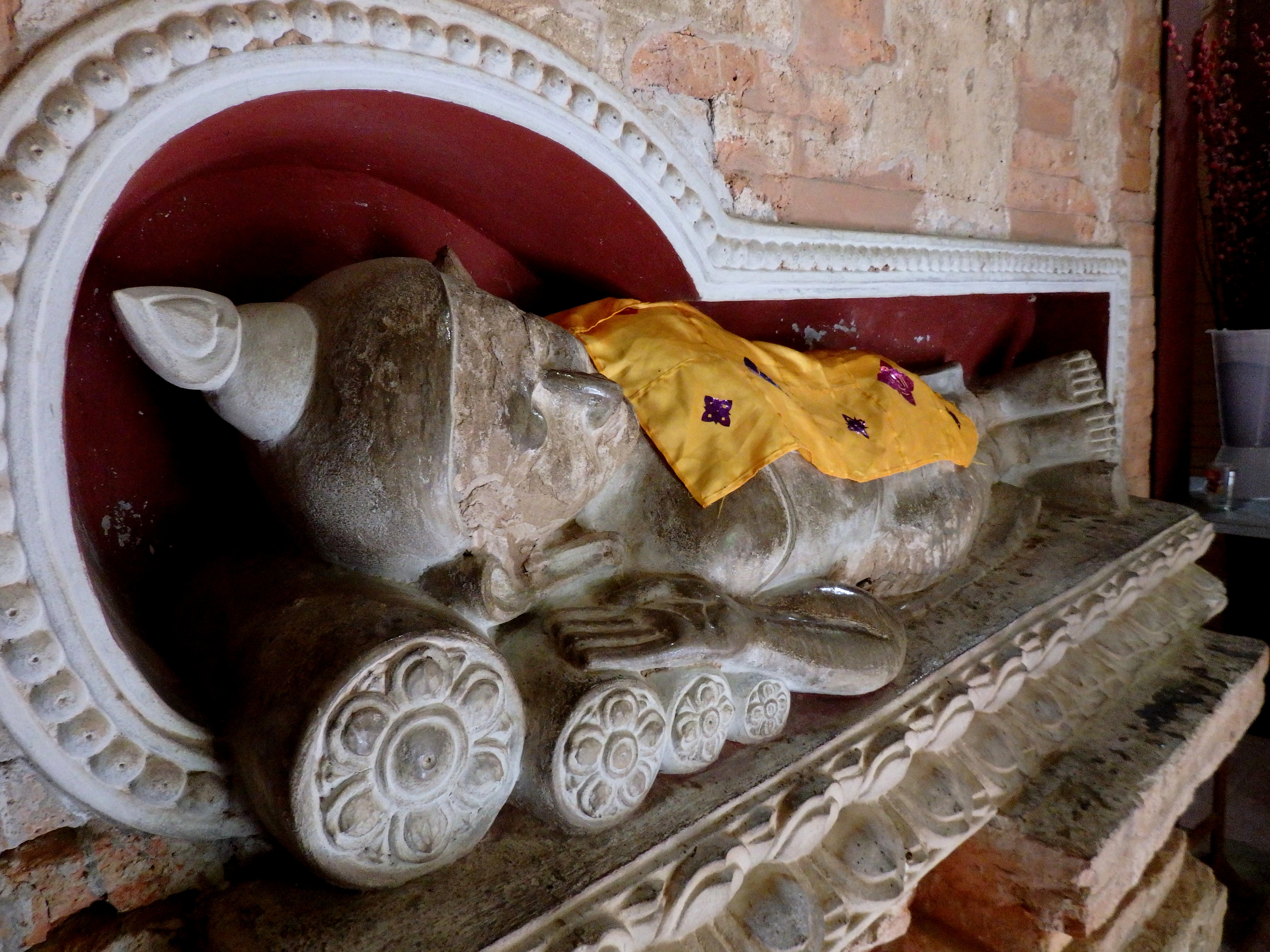
Reclining Buddha in the temple.

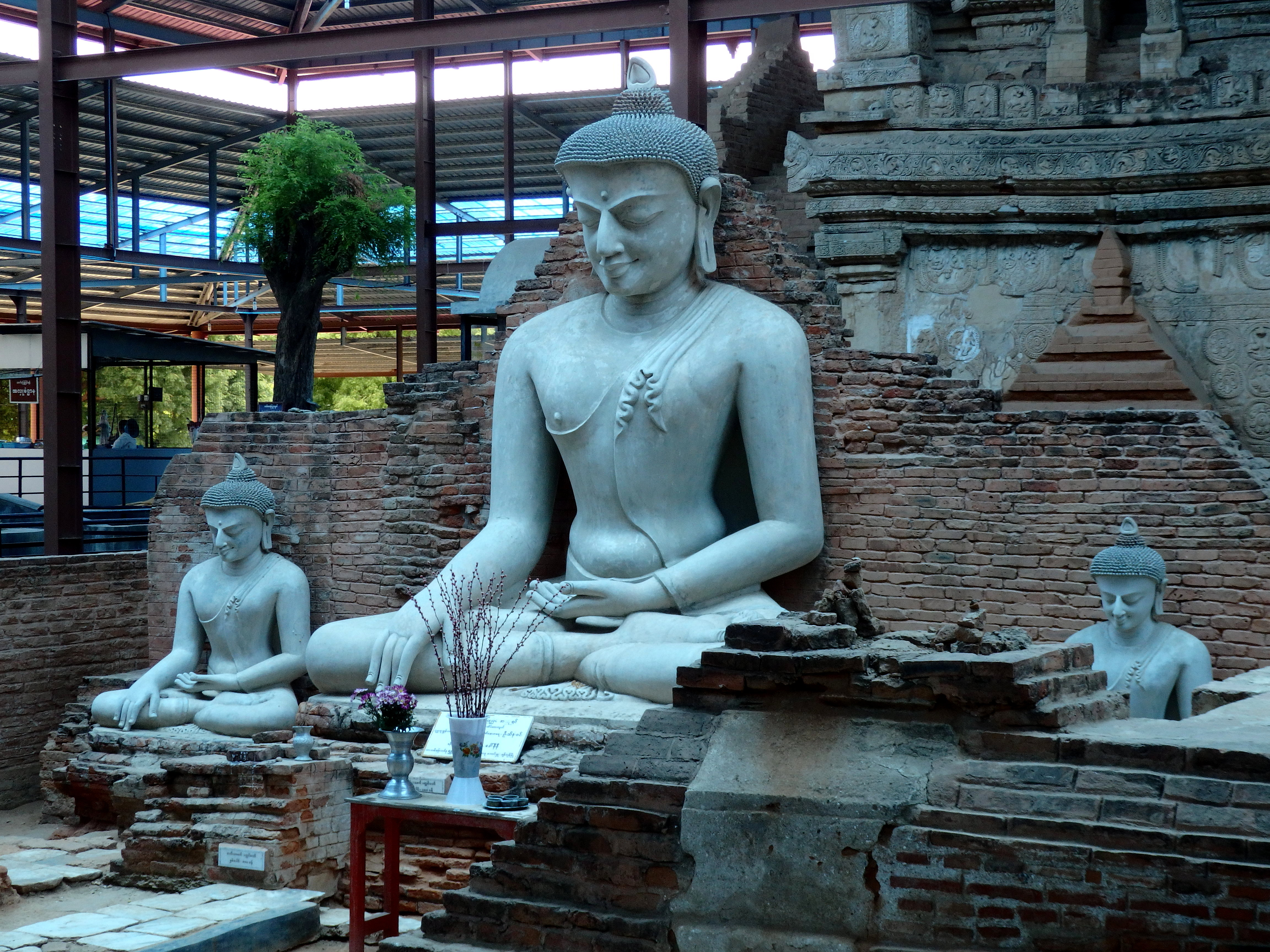
Buddha statues.

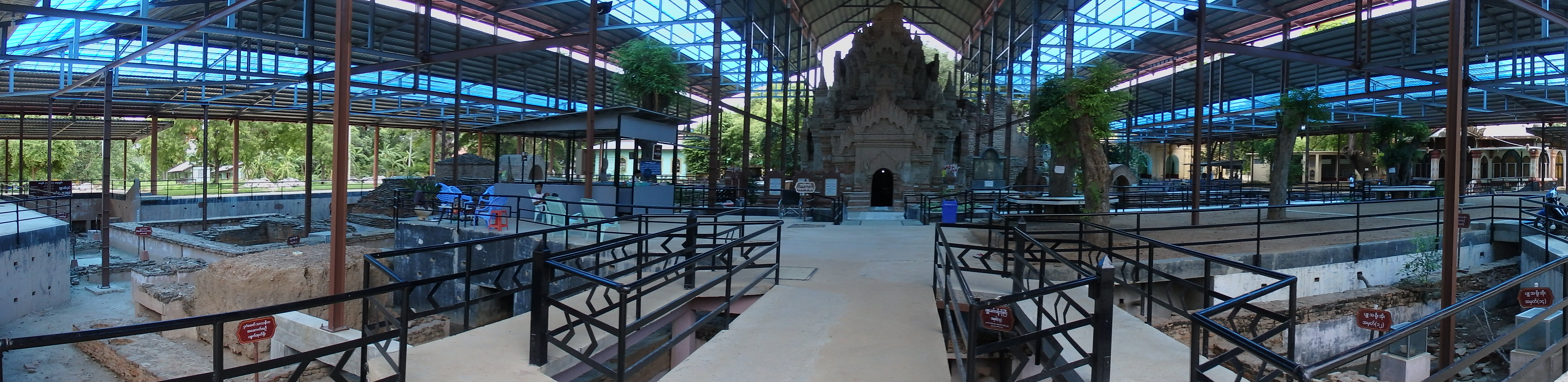
Tamote Shinpin Shwegugyi Temple compound in 2016.
