= All Burma Students' Democratic Front =

Armed opposition group in Myanmar

- မြန်မာနိုင်ငံလုံးဆိုင်ရာကျောင်းသားများဒီမိုကရက်တစ်တပ်ဦး
- Flag of All Burma Students' Democratic Front
- Leaders: Than Khe; Myo Win; Sonny Mahinder
- Dates active: 1 November 1988 – present
- Headquarters: Manerplaw (until 1995)
- Active regions: Kachin State; Kayin State; Magway Region; Mandalay Region; Mon State; Sagaing Region; Shan State; China–Myanmar border India–Myanmar border Myanmar–Thailand border
- Ideology: Liberal democracy Federalism
- Size: 1,000 (1989); 600 (2016)
- Wars: the internal conflict in Myanmar

The All Burma Students' Democratic Front (Burmese: မြန်မာနိုင်ငံလုံးဆိုင်ရာကျောင်းသားများဒီမိုကရက်တစ်တပ်ဦး; abbreviated ABSDF or မကဒတ) is an opposition group in Myanmar (also known as Burma). It was founded on 1 November 1988, after the 8888 protests in Yangon. The group's leadership consists mostly of former student exiles.

The ABSDF operates an armed wing, which has fought alongside other armed opposition groups in Myanmar, such as the Kachin Independence Army and the Karen National Liberation Army.

== Objectives ==
The objective of the group is to free the people of Myanmar from the oppression of the military, to create a democracy with political freedom and respect for human rights, to obtain nationwide peace, and to introduce a federal system in the country.

== Leadership ==
The ABSDF elects its leadership democratically, with leaders of the organisation serving for three-year terms in accordance with the ABSDF constitution. Its first leader was Htun Aung Gyaw, a leader in the December 1974 student protests following the U Thant funeral crisis. The following is the list of the organisation's current leaders who were elected in ABSDF's Eleventh Conference convened in September 2018, to serve for a three-year executive term.

- Than Khe - Chairman
- Myo Win - Vice-chairman
- Sonny Mahinder - General Secretary
- Myint Hein - Joint-General Secretary
- Ye Htut @ Hla Htay - Joint-General Secretary
- Ma Lay Lone @ Mi Sue Pwint - Central Leading Committee Member
- Min Zaw - Central Leading Committee Member
- Saw Maung Oo - Central Leading Committee Member
- Salai Yaw Aung - Central Leading Committee Member

== History ==
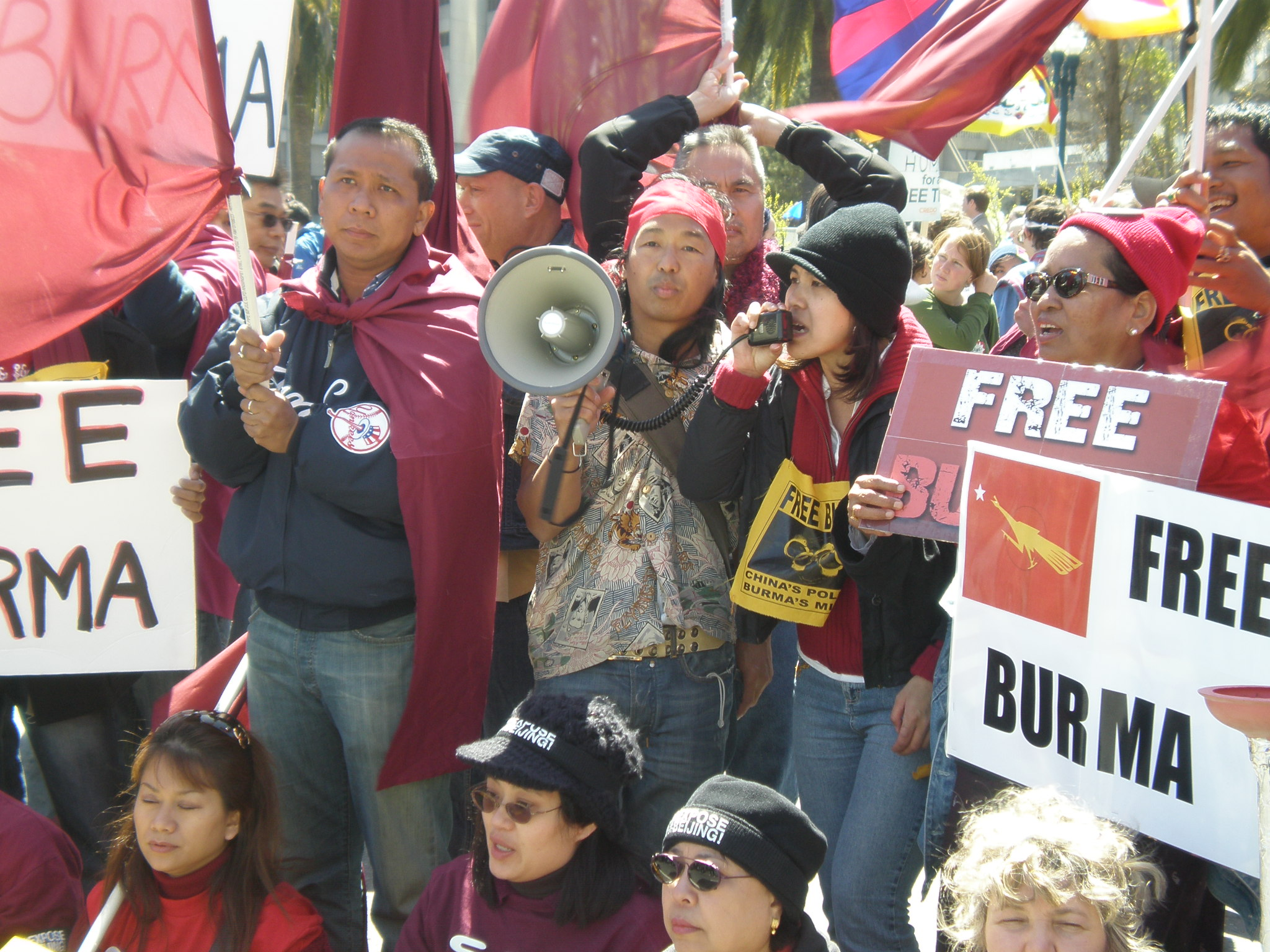
Protesters protesting China's support for the Myanmar regime display the flag of The ABSDF, 2008

The Burmese military staged a coup d'état in September 1988, following its crackdown on peaceful demonstrations concerning democracy and human rights. Soon after seizing state power, the State Law and Order Restoration Council, the then-military regime, announced that it would hold a free and fair election. It encouraged the public to register political parties. However, at the same time, regime officials were suppressing political expression and opposition throughout the country.

It was in this atmosphere that serious discussions and debates took place within the All Burma Federation of Student Unions (ABFSU) to find ways to continue the struggle. Finally, leaders of the ABFSU reached a decision: the struggle would consist of three practical strategies: Maintaining semi-underground networks, forming a political party, and taking up arms.

To pursue this decision, thousands of people, mostly students, youth, and intellectuals, left for the border areas near Thailand, India, China, and Bangladesh. On 1 November 1988, they founded the All Burma Students’ Democratic Front (ABSDF) on the Myanmar-Thailand border. Thus, the formation of the ABSDF and its Student Army followed closely on ABFSU's decision. In other words, its formation was a strategic decision of the student movement inside Myanmar.

To fulfill its aims and objectives, the ABSDF upholds the strategy of "armed struggle in combination with political activities". From 2001 to 20 December 2010 ABSDF was on the US terror list.

== Name origin ==
The ABSDF is an organisation representing all students and social classes throughout Myanmar in their struggle to achieve democracy and human rights. The students of Myanmar were recognised as the leading force fighting against the dictatorial military regime, and the Front indiscriminately counts all Burmese ethnic nationalities and classes among their membership. The ABSDF is at the forefront of the popular struggle for democracy and human rights in Myanmar; hence the name "All Burma Students’ Democratic Front". ABSDF's motto is born out of collective experiences: "Our Heads are Bloody But Unbowed".

== Politics ==
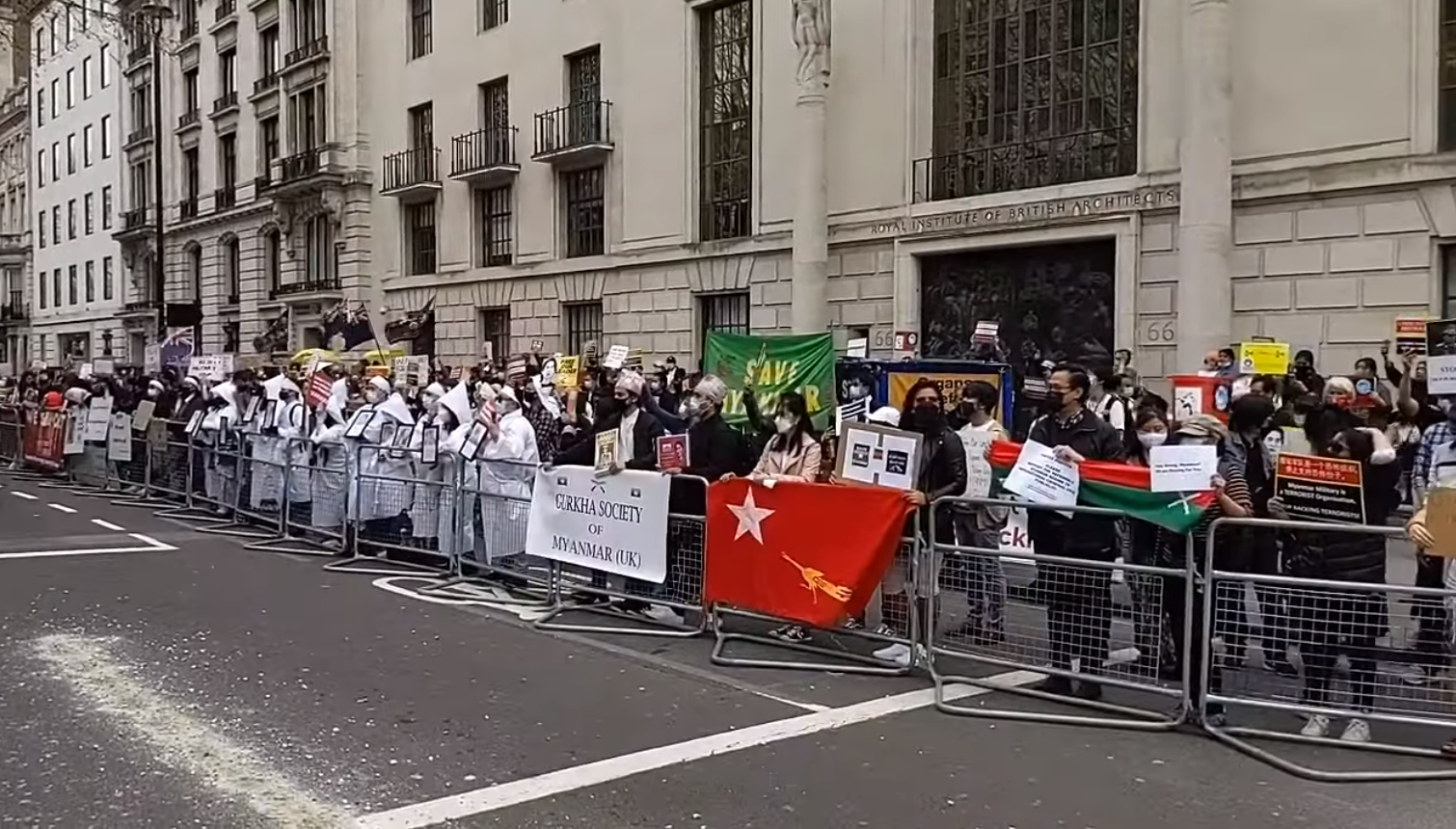
Protesters display the flag of the ABSDF outside the Embassy of China, London, 2021

The ABSDF is a combatant in the civil war in Myanmar, which is a long-running conflict between government forces and opposing various armed factions. People who are struggling against the military dictatorship to overthrow it constitute not a single stratum but a cross-section of all people regardless of social class, gender, ethnic origin, religion, education, and political ideology. Based on that ideology, the ABSDF believes in national politics and applies it as a political strategy.

== Membership and camps ==
The ABSDF holds seven camps on the Myanmar–Thailand border, one camp spread over three separate locations on the Myanmar-India border, and one camp spread over three separate locations on the Myanmar-China border. It also has foreign branches such as in the United States and Australia.

The ABSDF is a member organisation of the National Council of the Union of Burma, an umbrella organisation of the border-based opposition.

The ABSDF is also a member organisation of the Asian Students' Association, the International Union of Students, and the World Federation of Democratic Youth.

== Ceasefire talks ==
ABSDF had held two formal discussions and three informal gatherings with the government in 2012 and 2013. On 5 August 2013, the Kayin State government and ABSDF signed a state-level ceasefire agreement in Yangon. On 10 August, the Burmese government and ABSDF signed a 13-point preliminary ceasefire agreement. The agreement includes continuation of political dialogues to reach ceasefire agreement, formation of independent monitoring committee for ceasefire, opening of liaison offices, and setting a date to hold union-level political dialogue.

== Controversy ==
In 1991–92, 35 ABSDF members died in custody in Kachin State. Fifteen of them were executed as spies on 12 February 1992, 20 others were tortured to death while undergoing interrogation. Another 80 members were also detained on similar charges. The killings were allegedly motivated by internal power struggles within the organisation. That incident has attracted growing attention in 2012 on social media sites, where former members of the student army and their families claim no one has yet been held accountable. Naing Aung, who was the chairman of the ABSDF Southern Myanmar at the time, has denied the allegations and said that he is ready to co-operate with any inquiry into the incident.

== Terrorist designation ==
In 2010, the Secretary of Homeland Security, using discretionary authority, removed terrorism-related inadmissibility grounds for individuals associated with the ABSDF.

== See also ==
- Htein Lin (activist), Burmese artist and political activist
- Moe Thee Zun (exile in the US)
- Vigorous Burmese Student Warriors
