= Shwethalyaung Pagoda =

Buddhist temple in Kyaukse, Myanmar

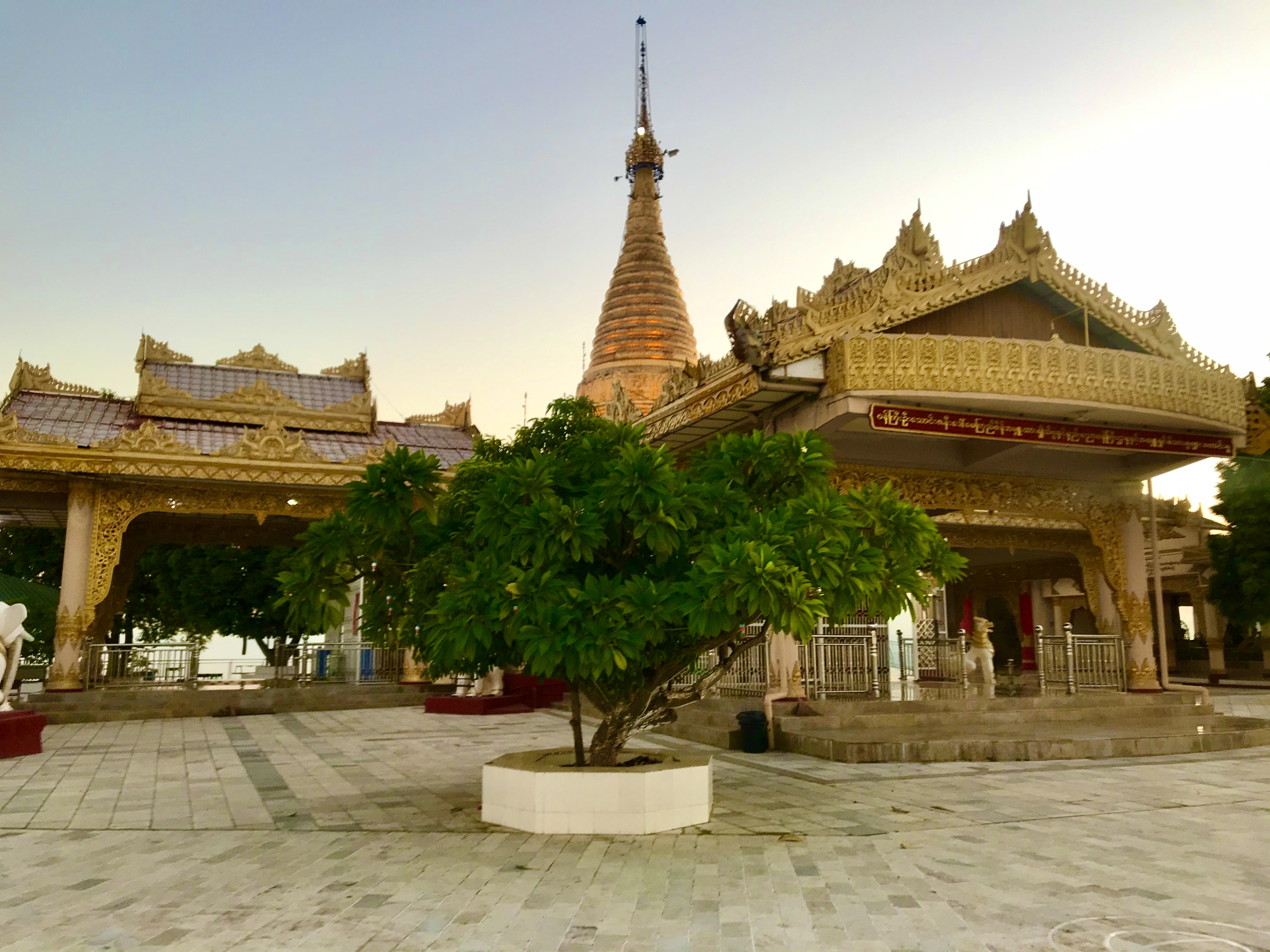
- Shwe Thar Lyaung Pagoda

- Location within Myanmar

Religion
- Affiliation: Theravada Buddhism

Location
- Location: Kyaukse, Mandalay Region
- Country: Myanmar
- Coordinates: 21°36′7.28″N 96°8′43.01″E

Architecture
- Founder: Anawrahta
- Groundbreaking: 11th century

Shwethalyaung Pagoda (Burmese: ရွှေသာလျောင်းဘုရား) is a Buddhist temple in Kyaukse, Mandalay Region, Myanmar. It is located on top of the Shwethalyaung Hill. The pagoda was built by King Anawrahta of Bagan and enshrines a replica of the Buddha's tooth.

== History ==
King Anawratha of Pagan obtained several Buddhist relics on a trip to China. Upon his return to Pagan, he decided to build a pagoda to house the precious relics. He strapped the replica of the Buddha's teeth to the back of his white elephant Sinma Yintha and told the elephant to choose a suitable spot for the new pagoda. When the elephant stopped in the two hills, named Shwethalyaung and Pyat Kha Yway, the monarch ordered the construction of pagodas on each summit and enshrined the relic at Shwethalyaung Pagoda. To honor the royal elephants, a festival named Kyaukse elephant dance festival is held every year at the foot of Shwethalyaung Hill.
