= Shwethalyaung Hill =

Burmese Buddhist pilgrimage site

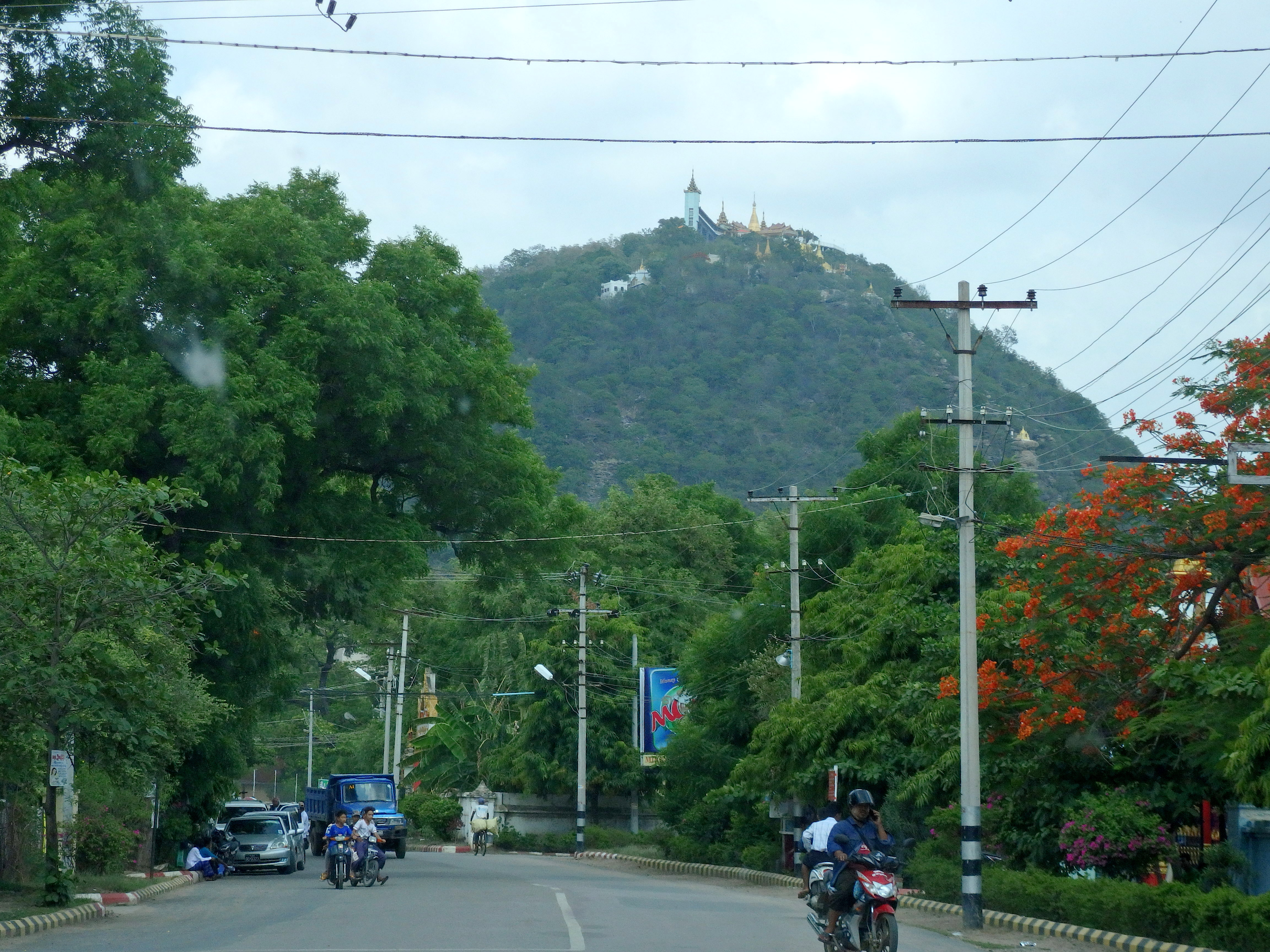
- View from the town

Highest point
- Elevation: 275 m (902 ft)
- Listing: List of mountains in Burma
- Coordinates: 21°36′7.28″N 96°8′43.01″E

Naming
- Native name: ရွှေသာလျောင်းတောင် (Burmese)

Geography
- Location within Myanmar
- Location: Mandalay Region, Myanmar

Climbing
- First ascent: unknown
- Easiest route: escalator

Shwethalyaung Hill (Burmese: ရွှေသာလျောင်းတောင်), also known as Kyaukse Hill (Burmese: ကျောက်ဆည်တောင်), is a 275 metres (902 ft) hill that is located to the east of Kyaukse in Myanmar. Shwethalyaung Hill is known for its abundance of pagodas and monasteries, and has been a sacred pilgrimage site for Burmese Buddhists. At the top of the hill is the Shwethalyaung Pagoda.

== History ==
King Anawratha of Pagan obtained several Buddhist relics on a trip to China. Upon his return to Pagan, he decided to build a pagoda to house the precious relics. He strapped the replica of the Buddha's tooth to the back of his white elephant Sinma Yintha and told the elephant to choose a suitable spot for the new pagoda. When the elephant stopped in the two hills, named Shwethalyaung and Pyat Kha Yway, the monarch ordered the construction of pagodas on each summit and enshrined the relic at Shwethalyaung Pagoda. To honor the royal elephants, a festival named Kyaukse elephant dance festival is held every year at the foot of Shwethalyaung Hill.

== Gallery ==
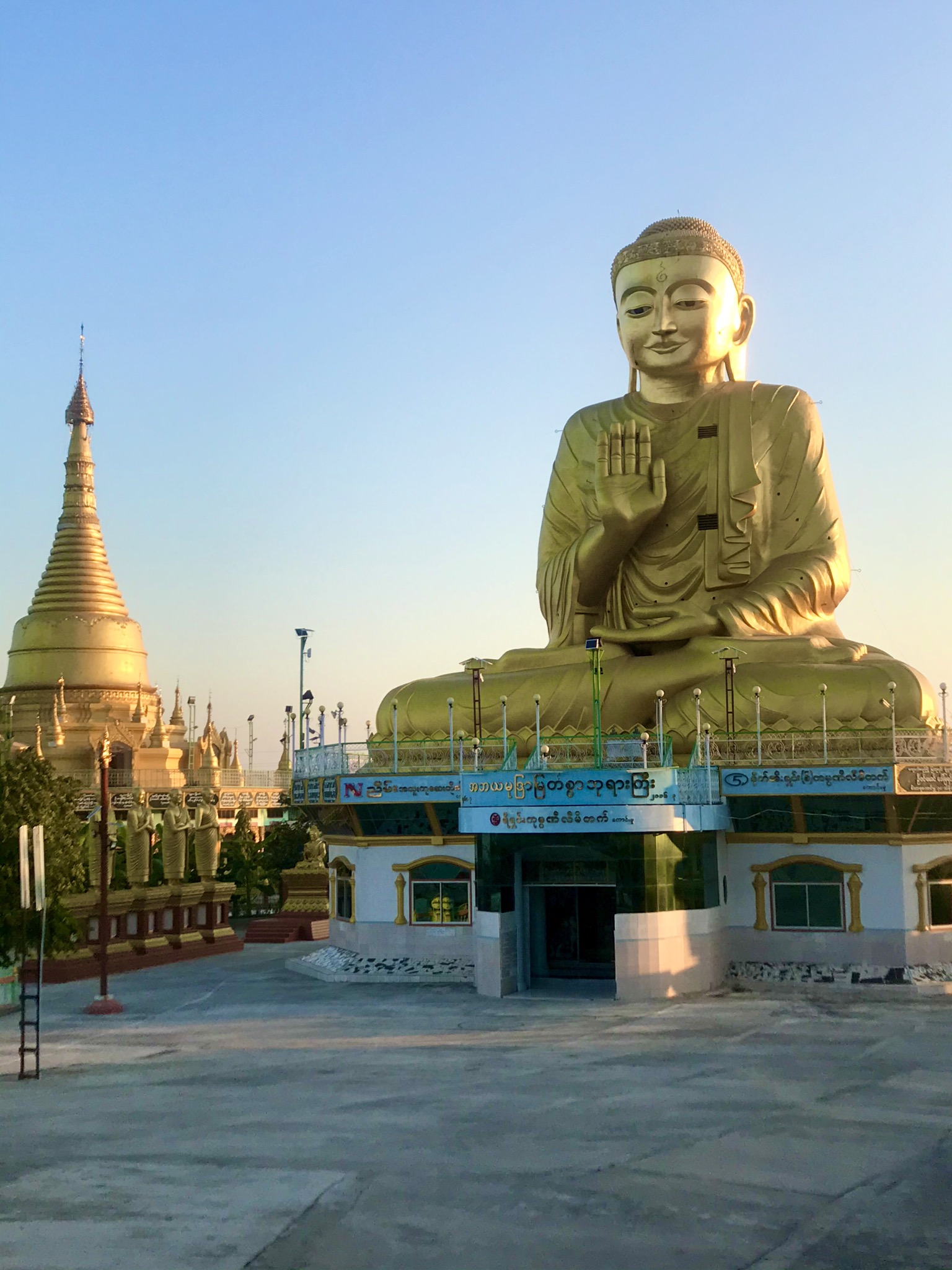
Abara Mudra Buddhist Statue.

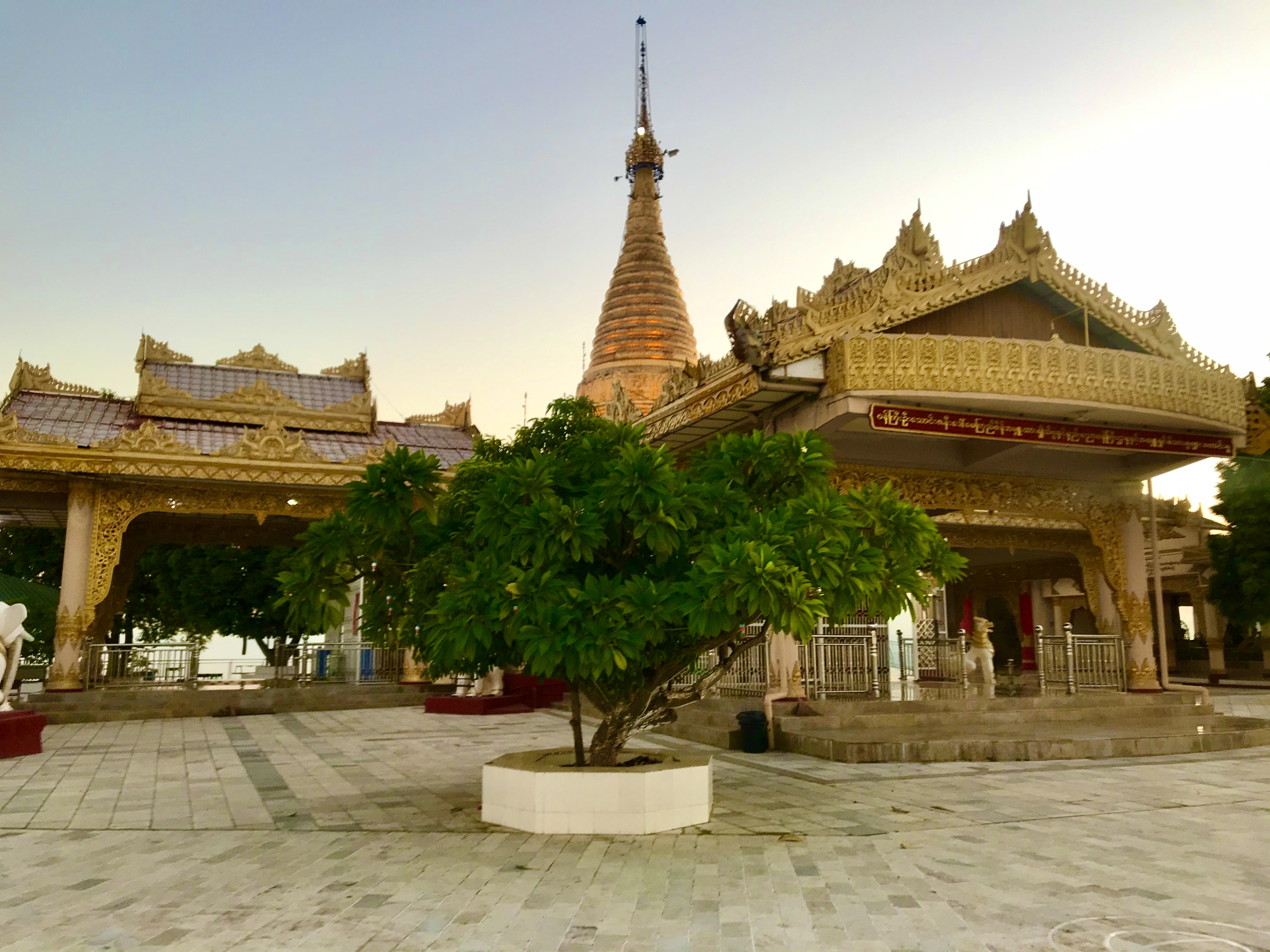
Shwethalyaung Pagoda.

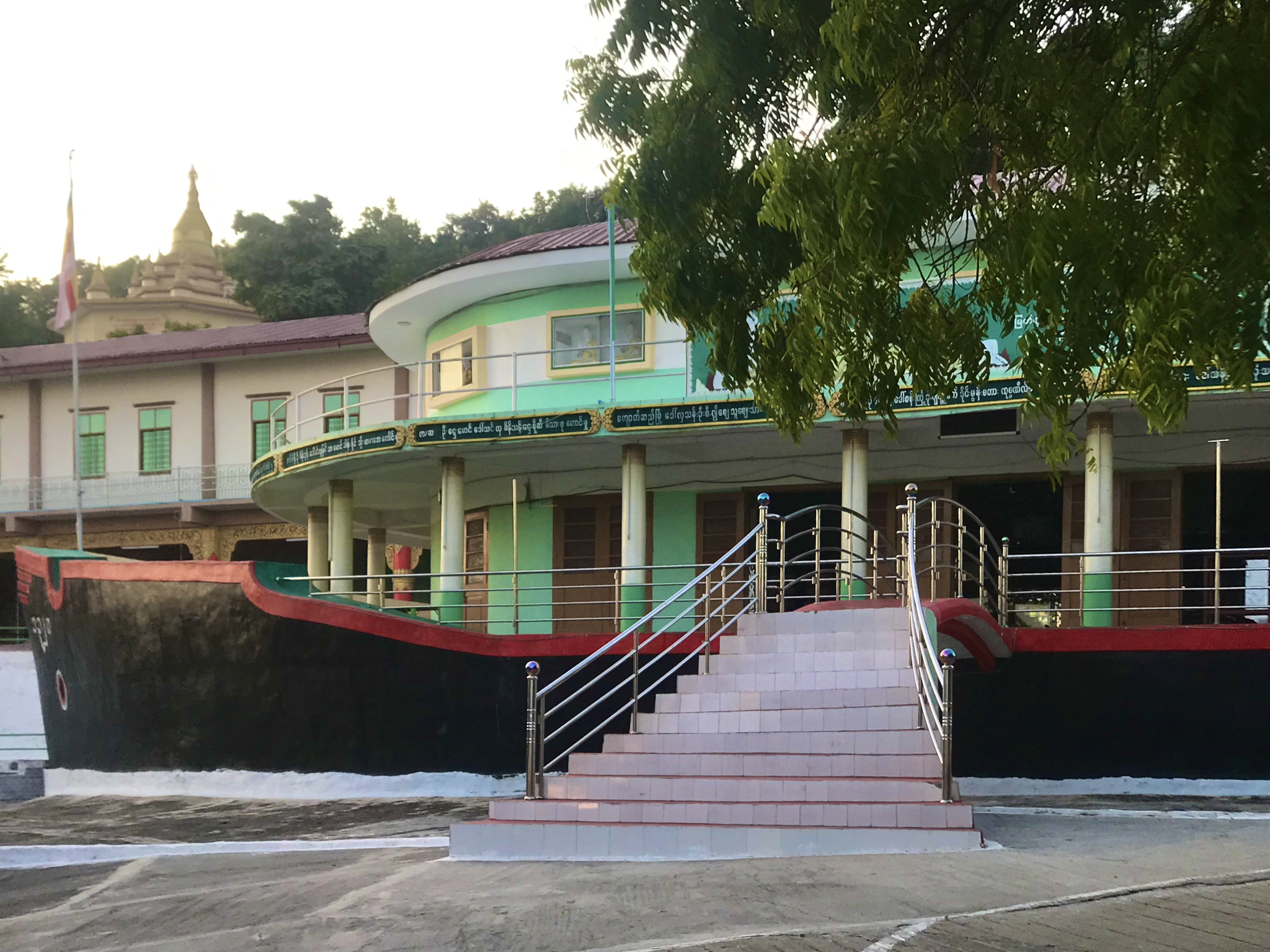
Kyauk Thinbaw Pagoda.

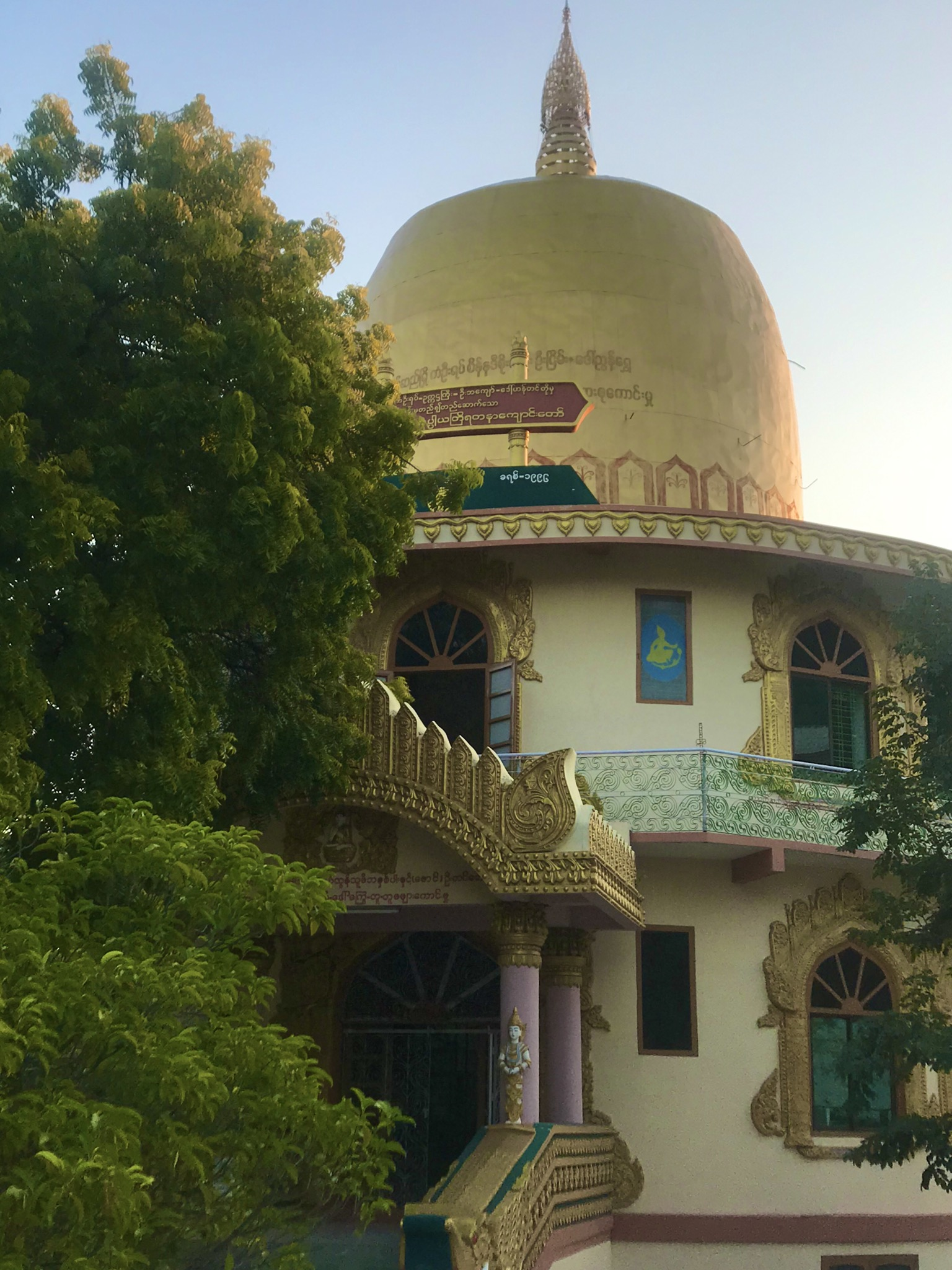
A monastery.

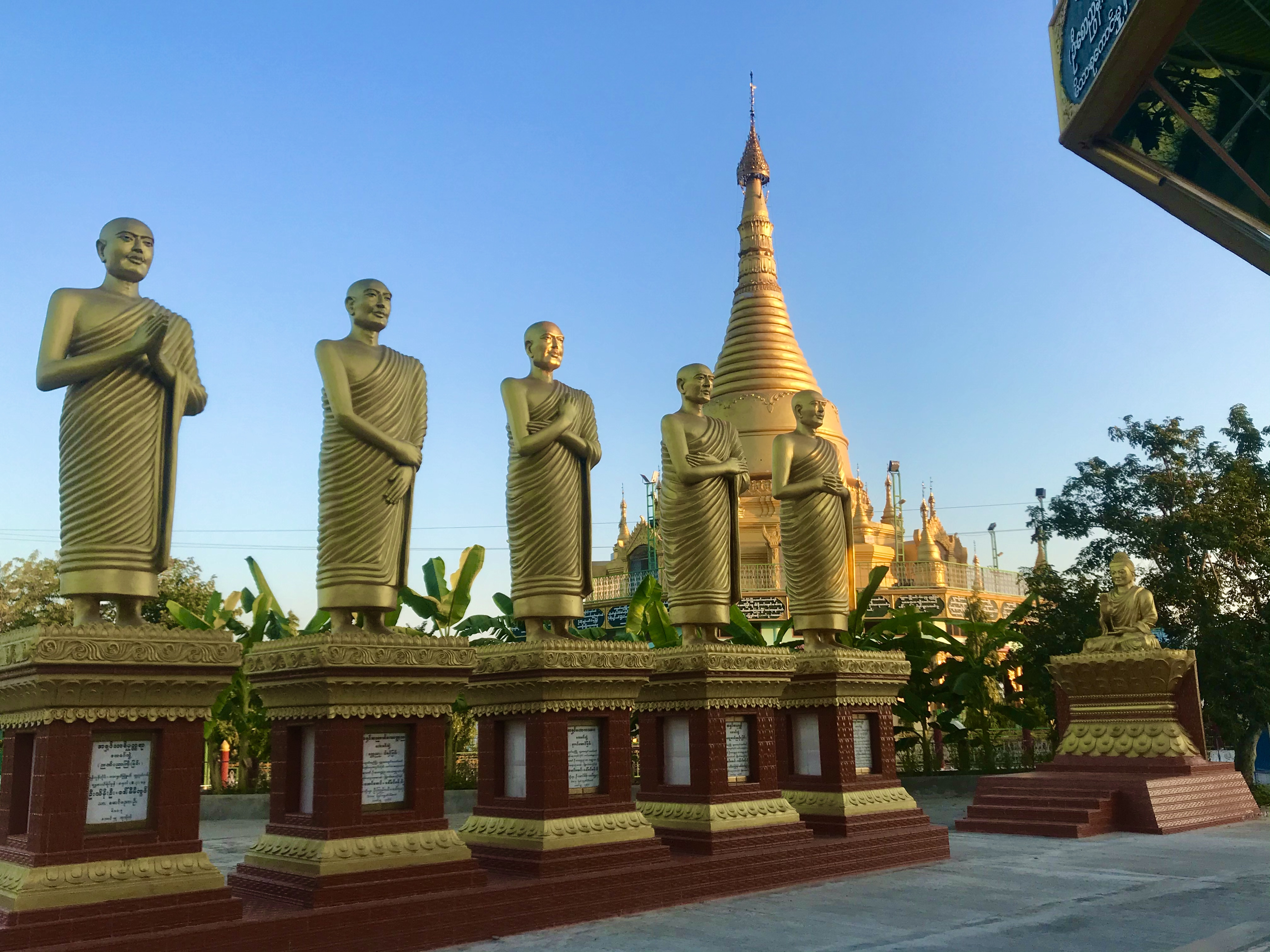
Arhat statues.

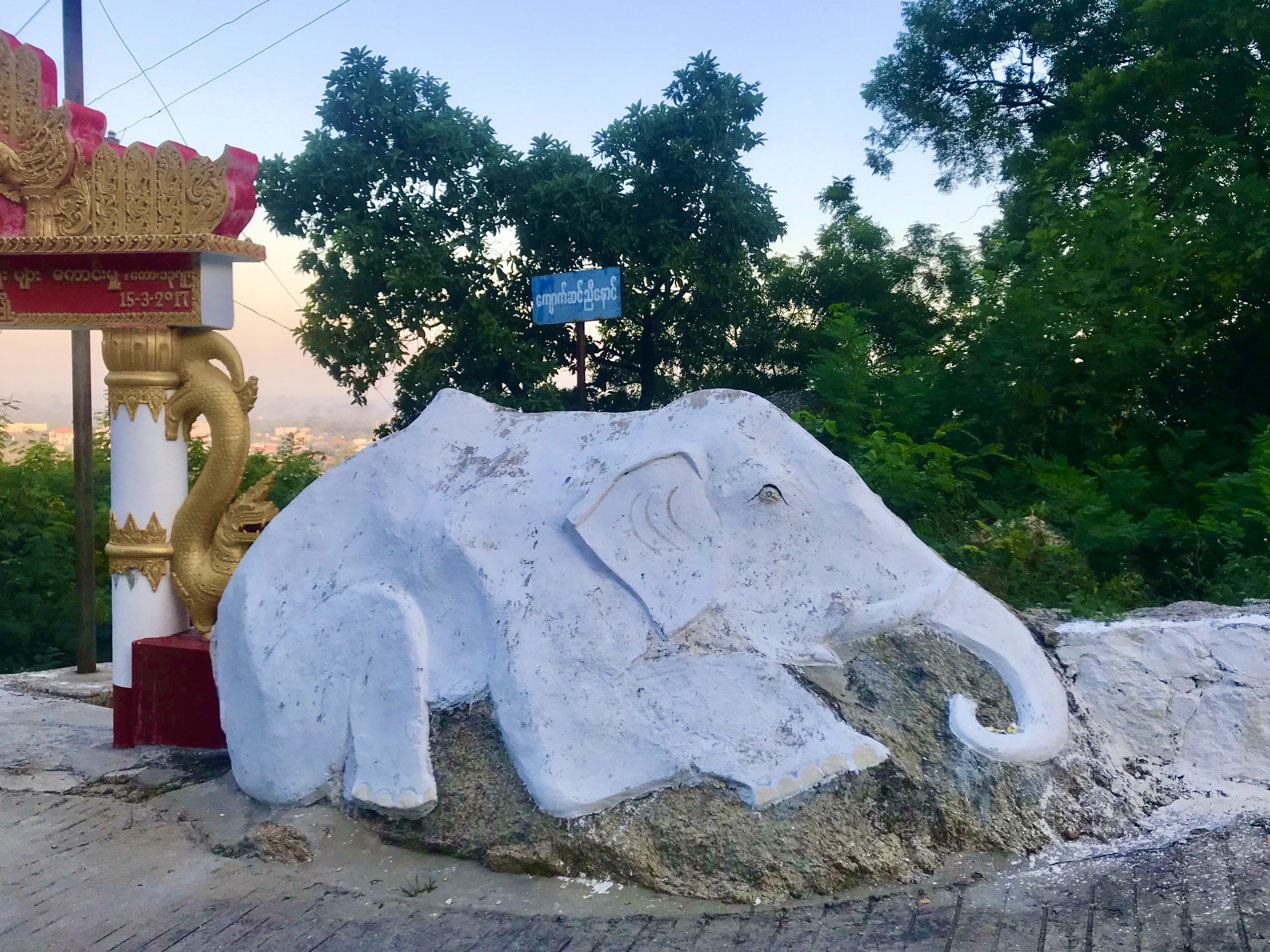
The giant elephant brothers.

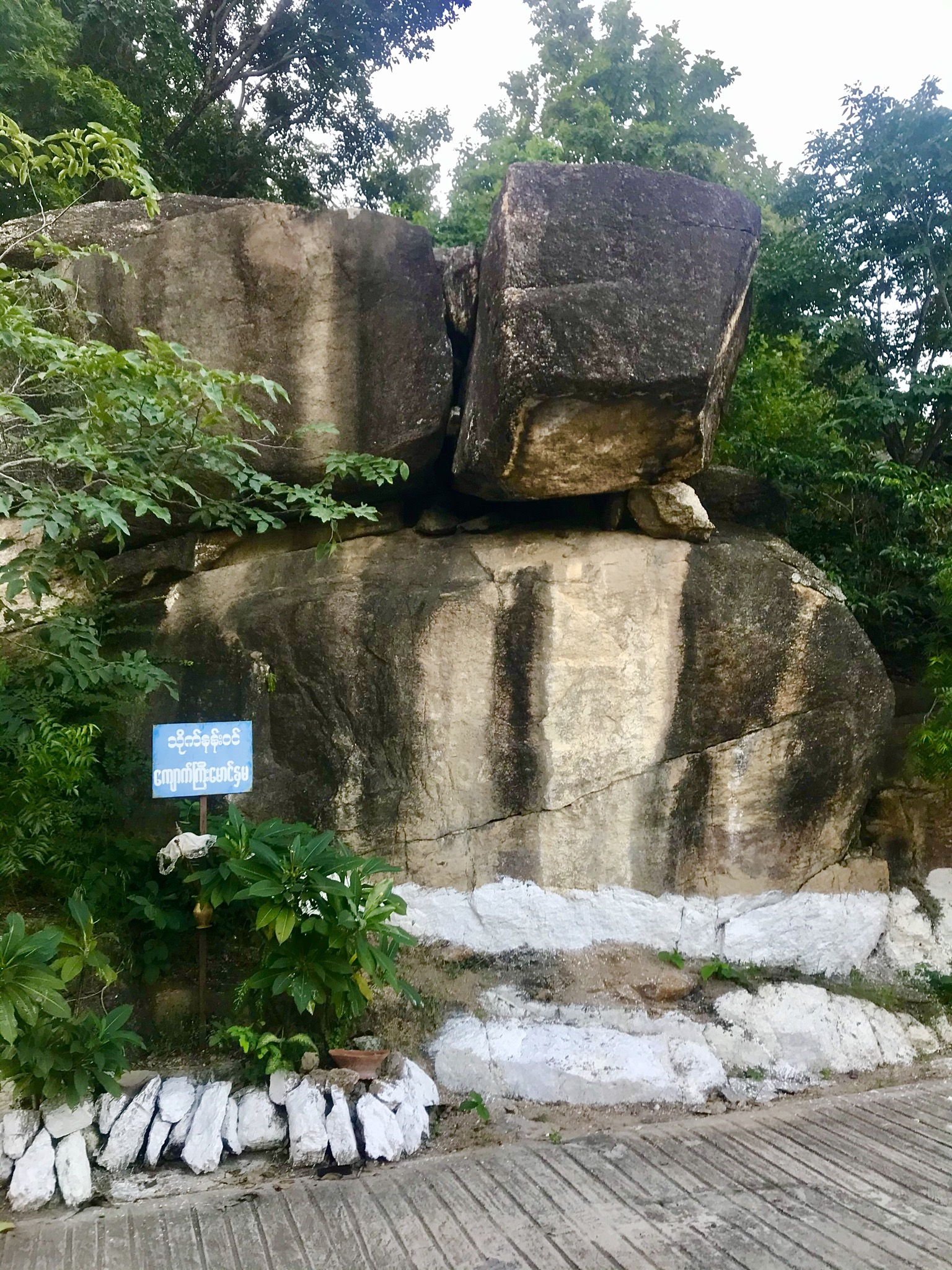
The great stone siblings, are keepers of the treasure trove.
