= Kyaukse Township =

- Township
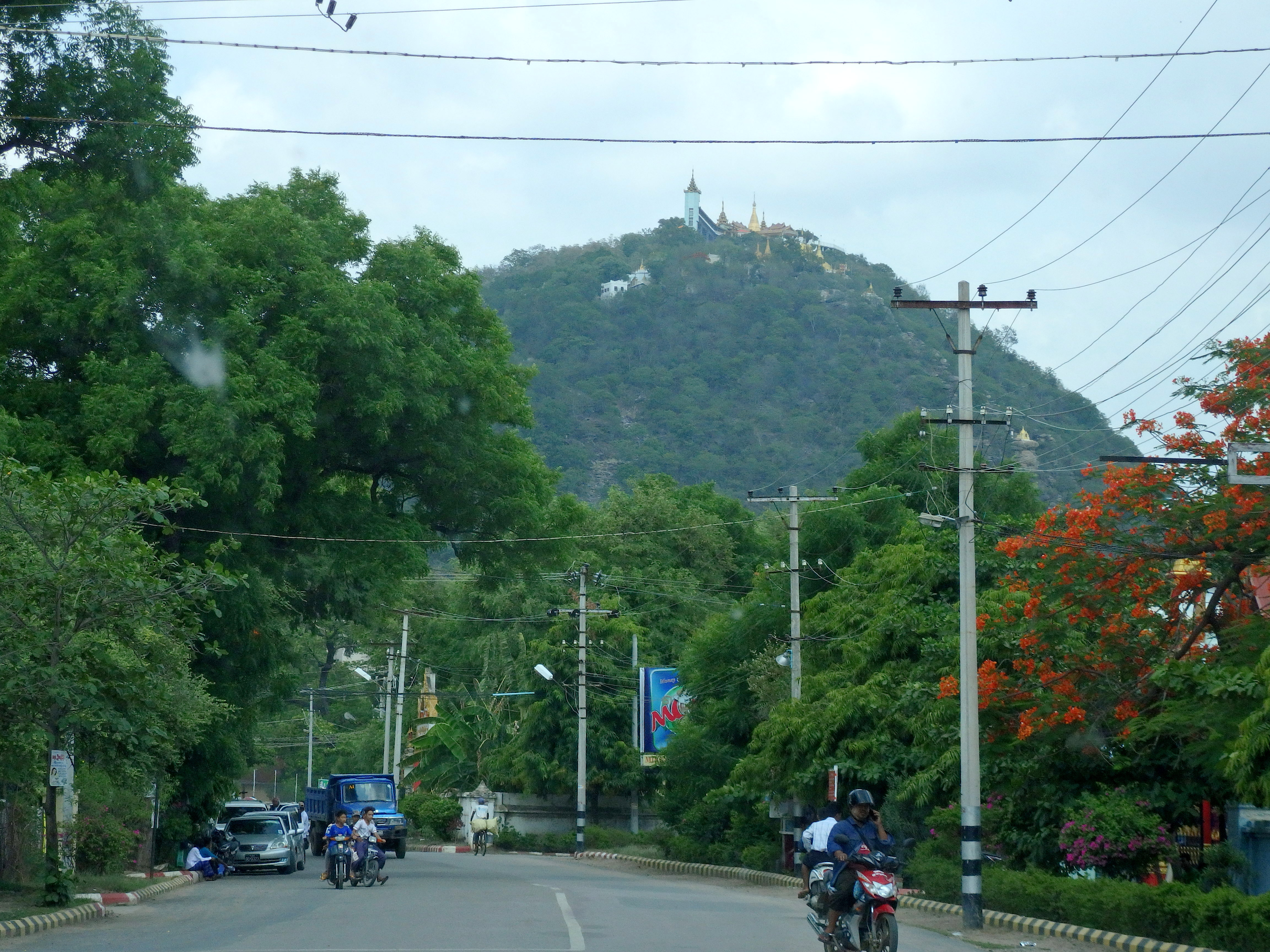

- Location within Myanmar
- Coordinates: 21°36′47″N 96°7′49″E
- Country: Myanmar
- Division: Mandalay Region
- District: Kyaukse District
- Capital: Kyaukse
- Time zone: UTC+6:30 (MMT)

Kyaukse Township is a township of Kyaukse District in the Mandalay Region of Myanmar. It makes up the area including the town of Kyaukse. Yeywa Dam is located there.

== Villages ==
- Chaungzon
- Dawe
- Dwehla
- Hamyinbo
- Hele
- Hele North
- Hele South
- Hin-ngu
- Hngetkadaung
- Indaing
- Inyaung
- Kade
- Kalagyaung
- Kale
- Kaungdin
- Kontha
- Kyaukpya
- Kyauksauk
- Kyauksaukkale
- Kyauksaukkon
- Kyaukse
- Kyaungbangon
- Kyaungywa
- Kyetsha
- Kyetsin
- Letpan
- Letpan
- Magyidan
- Maingban
- Mezebin
- Mezebin
- Mingan
- Minzu
- Mogyogon
- Monbaungywa
- Mwegon
- Myauk Hamyinbo
- Myauk Hin-ngu
- Myauk Monbaungywa
- Myezo
- Myindwin
- Myingondaing
- Nam-hu
- Nanni
- Naungkan
- Nga-o
- Ngedaw
- Nyaungbinzauk
- Nyaungwun
- Ongyaw
- Onletkauk
- Padaungga
- Pahtodaing
- Palambo
- Panan
- Patta
- Pedaw
- Pein
- Peleze
- Pindaleywama
- Ponnyetkyegyi
- Pyaukseikpin
- Pyiban
- Pyidawtha
- Sama
- Sawye
- Shabin
- Shantaungu
- Shanywa
- Shanywagyigon
- Shwele
- Swezon
- Taungbo
- Taungdaw
- Taung Hamyinbo
- Taung Hin-ngu
- Taunghlwe
- Taung Monbaungywa
- Tawdwin
- Tazo
- Thagaya
- Thanywa
- Thanywa Anauk
- Thanywa Ashe
- Thazi
- Thinbok
- Thindaung
- Thindaungywashe
- Thodan
- Uyingyi
- Yamanywa
- Yanbetlo
- Yebawgale
- Yebawgyi
- Yebyit
- Yegyi
- Yethayauk
- Ywabale
- Ywatha
- Ywathit
- Zale
- Zayitke
- Zibinwun
