= Pyawbwe =

Pyawbwe may refer to many places in Burma:

- Pyawbwe Township
- Pyawbwe, Pyawbwe Township
- Pyawbwe, Myittha Township
