= Sintgaing =

Sintgaing စဥ့်ကိုင်မြို့
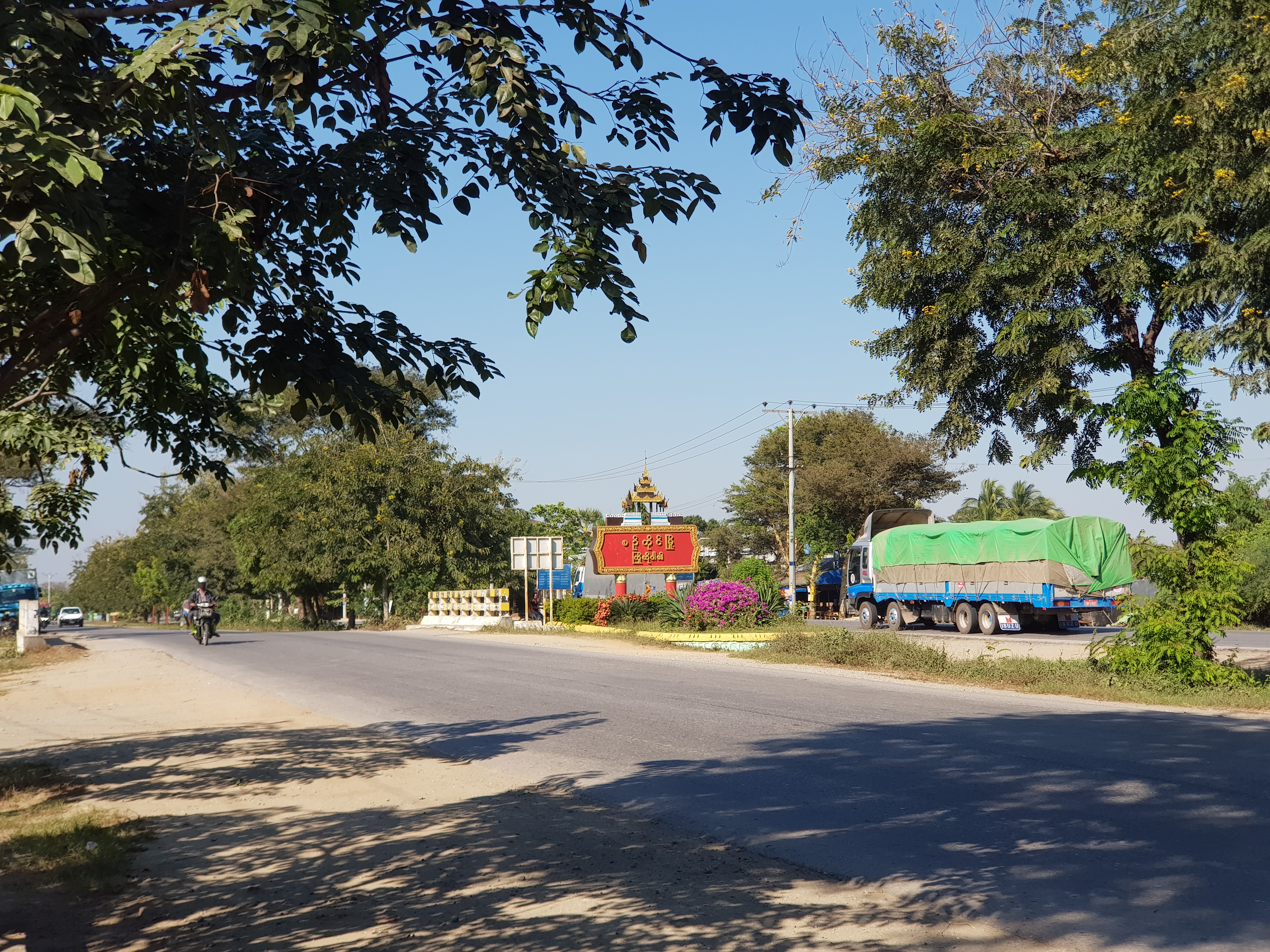

- Location in Burma
- Coordinates: 21°43′59″N 96°7′0″E
- Country: Myanmar
- Region: Mandalay Region
- District: Kyaukse District
- Township: Sintgaing Township

Population (2005)
  - Religions: Theravada Buddhism
- Time zone: UTC+6.30 (MST)

Sintgaing (Burmese: စဥ့်ကိုင်မြို့) is a town and capital of Sintgaing Township in the Mandalay Region of central Myanmar.
