= Myittha, Mandalay Region =

Myittha မြစ်သား
- Town
- Location in Myanmar
- Coordinates: 21°25′N 96°8′E
- Country: Myanmar
- Region: Mandalay Region
- District: Kyaukse District
- Township: Myittha Township

Population (2005)
  - Religions: Buddhism
- Time zone: UTC+6.30 (MST)

Myittha is a town in Myittha Township, Kyaukse District, Mandalay Region, central Myanmar.

== See also ==
- Myittha River
