= Pyawbwe, Myittha Township =

Pyawbwe ပျော်ဘွယ် Pyawywa
- Location in Burma
- Coordinates: 21°32′N 95°59′E
- Country: Burma
- Division: Mandalay
- District: Kyaukse District
- Township: Myittha Township

Population
  - Religions: Buddhism
- Time zone: UTC+6.30 (MST)

Pyawbwe is a village in Kyaukse District of the Mandalay Division in central Myanmar.
