= Myittha Township =

- Township
- Location in Kyaukse district

- Location within Myanmar
- Coordinates: 21°25′N 96°8′E
- Country: Myanmar
- Region: Mandalay Region
- District: Kyaukse District
- Capital: Myittha
- Time zone: UTC+6:30 (MMT)

Myittha Township is a township of Kyaukse District in the Mandalay Region of Myanmar. The capital is Myittha. Myittha Township consists of 6 wards and 227 villages.
