= Sintgaing Township =

Coordinates: 21.7333°N 96.1167°E

- Township
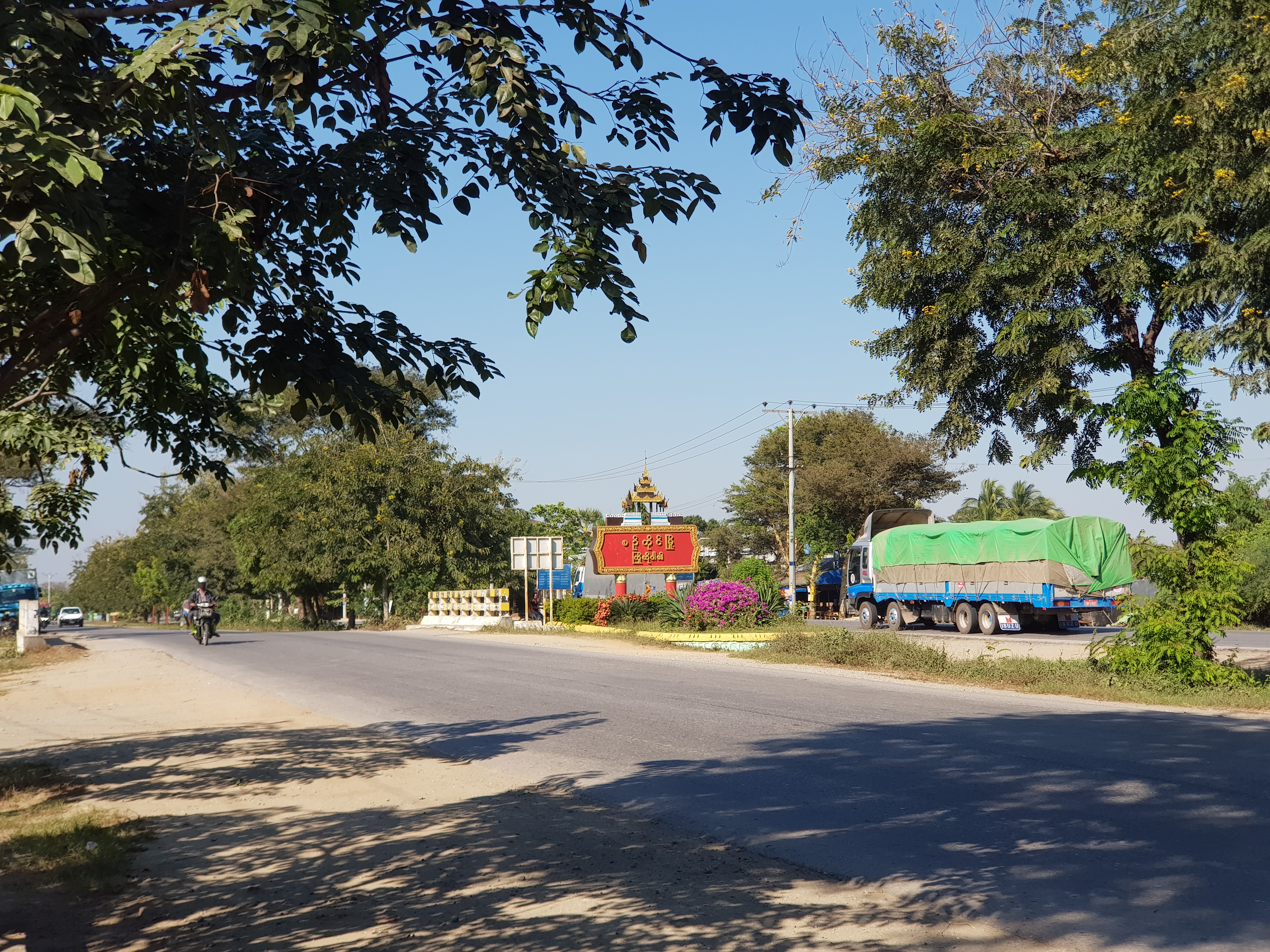
- Entrance to Township

- Location in Kyaukse district
- Country: Myanmar
- Region: Mandalay Region
- District: Kyaukse District
- Time zone: UTC+6:30 (MMT)

Sintgaing Township is a township of Kyaukse District in the Mandalay Region of Burma (Myanmar).
