= Kyaukse District =

District in Myanmar

Coordinates: 21°45′N 96°15′E

Kyaukse District is a district of the Mandalay Region in central Myanmar.

Location of Kyaukse district in Mandalay region

== Townships ==
The district contains the following townships:

- Kyaukse Township
- Sintgaing Township
- Myittha Township

Tada-U Township was promoted as Tada-U District in 2022.
