= Sithu Thanbawa =

Sithu Thanbawa; စည်သူ သမ္ဘဝ

Prince of the Five Irrigated Districts
- Reign: 1380s – 1390s?
- Predecessor: ?
- Successor: ?
- Monarch: Swa Saw Ke
- Born: c. late 1360s Ava (Inwa)? Ava Kingdom
- Died: 1390s?
- Issue: Sithu of Paukmyaing
- Father: Sithu Min Oo
- Mother: Minkhaung Medaw

Sithu Thanbawa (Burmese: စည်သူ သမ္ဘဝ, pronounced [sìðù θàɰ̃bəwa̰] or more commonly, as [sìðù θàɰ̃məwa̰]; also transliterated as Sithu Thambhawa; c. late 1360s – 1390s) was a Burmese prince who held in fief the Five Irrigated Districts (centered around present-day Yamethin District) of the Ava Kingdom in the late 14th century. Descended from the Pagan royal lines from both sides, the prince was an ancestor of kings Mingyi Nyo, Tabinshwehti and Nanda of the Toungoo dynasty.

== Brief ==
Probably born in the late 1360s, (Note: Inferred from chronicle reporting. Since the future king Swa (born in July 1330 per (Zata 1960: 46, 72)) returned from Arakan to Pinya only in 1343/44 per (RRT Vol. 1 1999: 181), he could have married his first wife Khame Mi in 1343/44 at the earliest. Since he was still just 13 years old in 1343/44, he more likely got married when he was a few years older in the mid-to-late 1340s, and the couple's third child Minkhaung Medaw was probably born in the early 1350s. Since she was apparently married off to a much older Sithu Min Oo after Swa became king in 1367, she could have given birth to her first child Sithu Thanbawa c. 1368 at the earliest.) Sithu Thanbawa was the elder child of Prince Sithu Min Oo of Pinya and Princess Minkhaung Medaw of Ava. (Note: The earliest national chronicle, Maha Yazawin, does not include any information about Sithu Thanbawa's ancestry. The Yazawin Thit chronicle (Yazawin Thit Vol. 1 2012: 206) says Princess Minkhaung Medaw, the third daughter of King Swa and Queen Khame Mi, was the mother of the Sithu brothers. But the Hmannan Yazawin chronicle (Hmannan Vol. 1 2003: 436) says Princess Saw Salaka Dewi, the second daughter, was the mother of the brothers. However, Hmannan's reporting is missing the information on the third daughter even though Hmannan itself says the royal couple had three daughters and two sons.) His father was a son of King Uzana I of Pinya (r. 1325–1340) and his mother was a daughter of King Swa Saw Ke of Ava (r. 1367–1400). He had two younger brothers, Thray Sithu, who became governor of Myinsaing, and Thihapate, who became governor of Taungdwin.

According to the royal chronicles, Sithu Thanbawa held the Five Irrigated Districts (Note: Per (Thein Hlaing 2011: 151), the "Five Irrigated Districts" were: (1) Yamethin, (2) Petpaing, (3) Pyakaung, (4) Taung Nyo and (5) Tamyinhsan.) (ရေလွှဲ ငါးခရိုင်; present-day Yamethin District and surrounding regions), by 1390. However, unlike most other feudal lords of the day, who were also governors of their fiefs, the prince apparently did not assume administrative duties of his fiefs, since he is not listed as a governor of the Yamethin District, not in 1390 or any time before or after, in the chronicles. (In 1390, his granduncle Gov. Thilawa was governor of the region.) (Note: Governors of Yamethin: Thilawa of Yamethin (1351–1395/96); Maha Pyauk of Yamethin (1395/96–1400); Sithu Pauk Hla of Yamethin (1400/01–1413); Sithu Thihapate of Yamethin (1413–1428/29?)) Furthermore, unlike other princes of the day, he went to the front only once, in 1390–1391 when he commanded a regiment during the Forty Years' War.

In all, the prince is not heard from again in the chronicles after 1390–1391, except with regard to his descendants. He had at least one child, Gov. Sithu of Paukmyaing. Through that child, kings Mingyi Nyo, Tabinshwehti and Nanda of the Toungoo Dynasty, were Sithu Thanbawa's descendants.

== Ancestry ==
Prince Sithu Thanbawa was descended from the Ava–Pinya–Myinsaing royal lines, and ultimately the Pagan royalty from both sides.

Ancestry of Prince Sithu Thanbawa

8. Narathihapate
4. Uzana I of Pinya
9. Mi Saw U
2. Sithu Min Oo
10. Kyawswa of Pagan
5. Atula Maha Dhamma Dewi
11. Saw Soe of Pagan
1. Sithu Thanbawa
12. Min Shin Saw of Thayet
6. Swa Saw Ke
13. Shin Myat Hla of Prome
3. Minkhaung Medaw
14. unknown
7. Khame Mi
15. unknown

== Bibliography ==
- Aung-Thwin, Michael A. (2017). Myanmar in the Fifteenth Century. Honolulu: University of Hawai'i Press. ISBN 978-0-8248-6783-6.
- Kala, U (2006) [1724]. Maha Yazawin (in Burmese). Vol. 1–3 (4th printing ed.). Yangon: Ya-Pyei Publishing.
- Maha Sithu (2012) [1798]. Kyaw Win; Thein Hlaing (eds.). Yazawin Thit (in Burmese). Vol. 1–3 (2nd ed.). Yangon: Ya-Pyei Publishing.
- Royal Historical Commission of Burma (2003) [1832]. Hmannan Yazawin (in Burmese). Vol. 1–3. Yangon: Ministry of Information, Myanmar.
- Sein Lwin Lay, Kahtika U (2006) [1968]. Min Taya Shwe Hti and Bayinnaung: Ketumadi Taungoo Yazawin (in Burmese) (2nd printing ed.). Yangon: Yan Aung Sarpay.
- Thein Hlaing, U (2011) [2000]. Research Dictionary of Burmese History (in Burmese) (3rd ed.). Yangon: Khit-Pya Taik.
