= Sithu =

Sithu, a former Burmese royal title and modern given name, may refer to:

== Kings ==
- Sithu I, King of Pagan (r. 1112–1167)
- Sithu II, King of Pagan (r. 1174–1211)
- Sithu III, King of Pagan (r. 1251–1256)
- Sithu IV, King of Pagan (r. 1256–1287)
- Sithu of Pinya, King of Pinya (r. 1340–1344)
- Sithu Kyawhtin, King of Ava (r. 1551–1555)

== Royalty, viceroys and governors ==
- Sithu Min Oo, Pretender to Pinya throne (1325–1364)
- Sithu Thanbawa, Prince of the Five Irrigated Districts (r. 1380s–1390s?)
- Thray Sithu of Myinsaing, Governor of Myinsaing (r. 1386–1426)
- Sithu of Paukmyaing, Governor of Paukmyaing (r. 1402–?)
- Sithu Pauk Hla of Yamethin, Governor of Yamethin (r. 1400–1413)
- Sithu Thihapate of Yamethin, Governor of Yamethin (r. 1413–1428 or later)
- Sithu Kyawhtin of Toungoo, Viceroy of Toungoo (Taungoo) (r. 1470–1481)
- Min Sithu of Toungoo, Viceroy of Toungoo (r. 1481–1485)

== Modern usage ==
- Sithu Aye (born 1990), Scottish-Burmese guitarist, musician, and producer based in Scotland
- Sithu Win (footballer), Burmese footballer
- Sithu Win (actor), Burmese actor and model
