= Thray Sithu of Myinsaing =

Burmese royal (1370s–1426)

Thray Sithu of Myinsaing; မြင်စိုင်း သရေစည်သူ

Governor of Myinsaing
- Reign: c. 1386 – 1426
- Predecessor: Thettawshay
- Successor: Sithu of Paukmyaing
- Monarch: Swa Saw Ke (1390–1400); Tarabya (1400); Minkhaung I (1413–1421); Thihathu (1421–1425); Min Nyo (1425–1426)

Viceroy of Arakan
- Reign: 1408 – 1409
- Predecessor: position vacant
- Successor: Letya of Phaunglin (as Military Commander)
- Monarch: Minkhaung I
- Born: c. early 1370s Ava (Inwa)? Ava Kingdom
- Died: c. April 1426; Wetchet? Ava Kingdom
- Father: Sithu Min Oo
- Mother: Minkhaung Medaw

Thray Sithu of Myinsaing (Burmese: မြင်စိုင်း သရေစည်သူ, pronounced [mjɪ̀ɰ̃záɪɰ̃ θəɹè sìðù]; c. early 1370s – 1426) was a Burmese royal who served as a senior minister at the court of Ava from 1400 to 1426. A grandson of two kings, the prince was governor of Myinsaing, the ancestral home of the Pinya–Sagaing–Ava dynasties, from c. 1386 to 1426. He was also Ava's wartime Viceroy of Arakan for a few months in 1408–1409.

His role was most prominent during the reign of his half-uncle King Minkhaung I (r. 1400–1421). The prince twice led the peace negotiations with the southern Hanthawaddy kingdom in 1403 and 1408 during the Forty Years' War. During the Ava succession crisis of 1425–1426, he supported his cousin King Min Nyo (r. 1425–1426), and commanded a depleted royal army against the forces of Governor Thado of Mohnyin. He suffered two consecutive defeats in battle in 1426, and is not mentioned again in the chronicles.

== Early life ==
Probably born in the early 1370s, (Note: Inferred from chronicle reporting. Since the future king Swa (born in July 1330 per (Zata 1960: 46, 72)) returned from Arakan to Pinya only in 1343/44 per (RRT Vol. 1 1999: 181), he could have married his first wife Khame Mi in 1343/44 at the earliest. Since he was still just 13 years old in 1343/44, he more likely got married when he was a few years older in the mid-to-late 1340s, and the couple's third child Minkhaung Medaw was probably born in the early 1350s. Since she was apparently married off to a much older Sithu Min Oo after Swa became king in 1367, she could have given birth to her second child Thray Sithu c. 1369 at the earliest. Thray Sithu was born most probably by the early 1370s since he was leading an infantry regiment in the 1390–1391 campaign per (Yazawin Thit Vol. 1 2012: 202) and (Hmannan Vol. 1 2003: 430).) Thray Sithu was the second child of Prince Sithu Min Oo of Pinya and Princess Minkhaung Medaw of Ava. (Note: The earliest national chronicle, Maha Yazawin, does not include any information about Thray Sithu's ancestry. The Yazawin Thit chronicle (Yazawin Thit Vol. 1 2012: 206) says Princess Minkhaung Medaw, the third daughter of King Swa and Queen Khame Mi, was the mother of the Sithu brothers. But the Hmannan Yazawin chronicle (Hmannan Vol. 1 2003: 436) says Princess Saw Salaka Dewi, the second daughter, was the mother of the brothers. However, Hmannan's reporting is missing the information on the third daughter even though Hmannan itself says the royal couple had three daughters and two sons.) His father was a son of King Uzana I of Pinya (r. 1325–1340) and his mother was a daughter of King Swa Saw Ke of Ava (r. 1367–1400). The prince apparently was held in high regard by King Swa who appointed his grandson to be governor of Myinsaing, the ancestral home of Pinya–Sagaing–Ava dynasties, c. 1386. (Note: The first explicit mention in the chronicles of Thray Sithu as governor of Myinsaing was in 1390 per (Yazawin Thit Vol. 1 2012: 202) and (Hmannan Vol. 1 2003: 430). But earlier chronicle reporting (Yazawin Thit Vol. 1 2012: 196, 198) and (Hmannan Vol. 1 2003: 417–418, 422) suggests that he may have received the post as early as 1386. (Yazawin Thit Vol. 1 2012: 198) and (Hmannan Vol. 1 2003: 422) say that an unnamed lord of Myinsaing as a regimental commander went to the front in the second (1386–1387) campaign. It was quite unlikely the lord of Myinsaing in 1386 was Governor Shwe Nan Shin of Myinsaing (b. c. 1322); he would have been too old to still be a regimental commander then. Indeed, per (Yazawin Thit Vol. 1 2012: 196) and (Hmannan Vol. 1 2003: 417–418), no lord of Myinsaing participated a year earlier, in the first (1385–1386) campaign.) He had one older brother Sithu Thanbawa, who held the "Five Irrigated Districts" (ရေလွှဲ ငါးခရိုင်; present-day Yamethin District and surrounding regions) in fief, (Note: Per (Thein Hlaing 2011: 151), the "Five Irrigated Districts" were: (1) Yamethin, (2) Petpaing, (3) Pyakaung, (4) Taung Nyo and (5) Tamyinhsan.) and at least one younger brother, Thihapate.

== Career ==
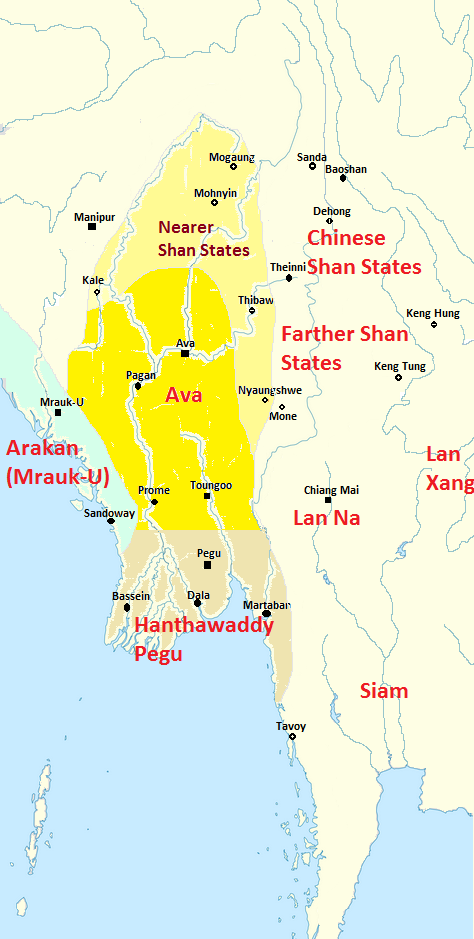
Political map of Myanmar c. 1450. The map in the 1420s was similar except in Arakan which was disorganized until 1429. The nearer Shan states in light yellow were tributaries of Ava.

=== Forty Years' War ===
His career was shaped by Ava's Forty Years' War (1385–1423) against the southern Hanthawaddy kingdom. Like senior princes of the day, he (and his older brother) started out in the royal army, as regimental commanders, and saw action in the third campaign (1390–1391) of the war. When the war was renewed in 1401, he had moved into the Ava high command, as a senior adviser to the then new king Minkhaung I. In January 1403, he led the Ava delegation that negotiated the initial ceasefire with the Hanthawaddy delegation led by Gen. Byat Za at the border. (The eventual peace treaty was negotiated by Chief Minister Min Yaza five months later.)

His second, certainly more famous, ceasefire negotiation came in August 1408. The peace treaty of 1403 had been broken by King Razadarit of Hanthawaddy in March/April 1408 when a Hanthawaddy army overthrew the Ava-installed king Anawrahta from Arakan (present-day Rakhine State). Furious, King Minkhaung, despite his advisers' strenuous objections, launched an invasion of the southern country in May 1408 right before the rainy season. When the invasion predictably got bogged down in the Irrawaddy delta three months into the campaign, the king sent a delegation led by Thray Sithu to negotiate a ceasefire. The first and only meeting of the negotiation was famous in Burmese history for the Hanthawaddy commander Lagun Ein's honest response to a routine question by the Ava commander Thado if Pegu was negotiating in good faith. Lagun Ein is said to have answered with brutal honesty: "Fool, this is war. You'll kill me if you can. I'll kill you if I can. How can you trust anyone?" Thray Sithu promptly broke off the negotiations. The Ava forces withdrew in total disarray with great loss of life.

After the disastrous invasion, Thray Sithu was sent to retake Arakan. According to the Arakanese chronicle Rakhine Razawin Thit, the Ava army led by the lord of Myinsaing briefly retook the Arakanese capital Launggyet in 1408. But he could not hold Launggyet when a Hanthawaddy army returned later in the dry season. The Ava forces fell back to a border fort near Nga Khwe-Thin Taung. Thray Sithu did not remain in Arakan; the Ava fort was commanded by Letya of Phaunglin for the next three years. It was Thray Sithu's last known campaign in the Forty Years' War, which ended in 1423. He is not mentioned in the subsequent campaigns of the war in any capacity in the chronicles.

=== Succession crisis (1425–1426) ===
The prince's last military campaign came during the Ava succession crisis of 1425–1426. He supported his cousin Prince Min Nyo of Kale who seized the throne in November 1425, after his allies had assassinated kings Thihathu and Min Hla within a three-month span. When Governor Thado of Mohnyin formally revolted in February 1426, (Note: (Yazawin Thit Vol. 1 2012: 271) and (Hmannan Vol. 2 2003: 59): Tabaung 787 ME = 6 February 1426 to 7 March 1426) Thray Sithu along with Governor Le Than Bwa of Onbaung agreed to lead the fight for Nyo. Thray Sithu set up camp with 2000 troops on the west bank at Thissein (modern Shwebo Township) about 100 kilometres (62 mi) north of Ava (Inwa), while Le Than Bwa guarded the east bank with another 2000 men.

Despite the preparations, Thissein fell quickly after a daring surprise attack from the river side by Thado's sons. The fort's defenses, which included 50 war boats, had not expected an attack by the Mohnyin navy as the main Mohnyin army had not yet shown up. Indeed, after the capture of Thissein, the sons had to wait for their father's army to arrive for another ten days. At Thissein, Thado paused, and recruited more troops from the region. Then the enlarged forces of Mohnyin attacked Wetchet, where Thray Sithu and his deputy Sokkate were waiting with 3000 troops. Ava troops put up a fight but the town eventually fell. Thray Sithu and Sokkate either fell in action or were captured as they are not mentioned in the chronicles afterwards.

== Ancestry ==
Prince Thray Sithu was descended from the Ava–Pinya–Myinsaing royal lines, and ultimately the Pagan royalty from both sides.

Ancestry of Prince Thray Sithu

8. Narathihapate
4. Uzana I of Pinya
9. Mi Saw U
2. Sithu Min Oo
10. Kyawswa of Pagan
5. Atula Maha Dhamma Dewi
11. Saw Soe of Pagan
1. Thray Sithu
12. Min Shin Saw of Thayet
6. Swa Saw Ke
13. Shin Myat Hla of Prome
3. Minkhaung Medaw
14. unknown
7. Khame Mi
15. unknown

== Bibliography ==
- Kala, U (2006) [1724]. Maha Yazawin (in Burmese). Vol. 1–3 (4th printing ed.). Yangon: Ya-Pyei Publishing.
- Maha Sithu (2012) [1798]. Kyaw Win; Thein Hlaing (eds.). Yazawin Thit (in Burmese). Vol. 1–3 (2nd ed.). Yangon: Ya-Pyei Publishing.
- Pan Hla, Nai (2005) [1968]. Razadarit Ayedawbon (in Burmese) (8th printing ed.). Yangon: Armanthit Sarpay.
- Royal Historians of Burma (1960) [c. 1680]. U Hla Tin (Hla Thamein) (ed.). Zatadawbon Yazawin. Historical Research Directorate of the Union of Burma.
- Royal Historical Commission of Burma (2003) [1832]. Hmannan Yazawin (in Burmese). Vol. 1–3. Yangon: Ministry of Information, Myanmar.
- Sandamala Linkara, Ashin (1997–1999) [1931]. Rakhine Razawin Thit (in Burmese). Vol. 1–2. Yangon: Tetlan Sarpay.
- Thein Hlaing, U (2011) [2000]. Research Dictionary of Burmese History (in Burmese) (3rd ed.). Yangon: Khit-Pya Taik.

Thray Sithu of Myinsaing Ava Kingdom Born: c. early 1370s Died: c. April 1426
Royal titles
Preceded by Thettawshay	Governor of Myinsaing c. 1386–1426	Succeeded by Sithu of Paukmyaing
Vacant	Viceroy of Arakan; 1408–1409	Succeeded by Letya of Phaunglin as Commander of Ava garrison
