= Thihapate III of Taungdwin =

Ruler of Taungdwin from 1426 to c. 1441

Thihapate III of Taungdwin; တောင်တွင်း သီဟပတေ့

Ruler of Taungdwin
- Reign: 1426 – c. 1441
- Predecessor: himself (as governor)
- Successor: Thiri Zeya Thura (as governor)

Governor of Taungdwin
- Reign: c. 1401 – 1426
- Predecessor: Thihapate II of Taungdwin
- Successor: himself (as independent ruler)
- Monarch: Minkhaung I
- Born: c. 1370s Ava Kingdom
- Died: c. 1440s Ava Kingdom
- House: Pinya
- Father: Sithu Min Oo
- Mother: Minkhaung Medaw (Note: The Yazawin Thit and Hmannan Yazawin chronicles do not agree on who the mother of Thray Sithu (and by extension, Thihapate) was: In the Yazawin Thit, she was Princess Minkhaung Medaw; In the Hmannan Yazawin, she was Princess Saw Salaka Dewi. The apparent discrepancy is likely due to missing information in the Hmannan. Although the Hmannan states the royal couple had three daughters and two sons, it contains information only about two daughters and two sons, none about the third daughter [Princess Minkhaung Medaw].)
- Religion: Theravada Buddhism

Thihapate III of Taungdwin (Burmese: တောင်တွင်း သီဟပတေ့, [tàʊɰ̃dwɪ́ɰ̃ θìha̰pətḛ]; c. 1370s–c. 1440s) was the self-proclaimed ruler of Taungdwin (in present-day south-central Myanmar) from 1426 to c. 1441. Previously, he had served as a loyal governor of the region under Ava kings, and as a regimental commander in the Royal Ava Army from c. 1401 to 1426. He participated in all three wars with the southern Hanthawaddy kingdom between 1401 and 1423.

Thihapate launched a rebellion after Governor Thado of Mohnyin seized the Ava throne in 1426. Although he controlled a relatively small region, he preserved his autonomous rule by forming an alliance with the rebel rulers of Toungoo (Taungoo) and Yatsauk. He was ultimately defeated and captured by Ava forces in c. 1441.

== Background ==
The royal chronicles (Note: See the Yazawin Thit, and Hmannan Yazawin chronicles. The Maha Yazawin provides no information about his background.) provide only limited information regarding Thihapate's ancestry: He was the younger brother of Thray Sithu of Myinsaing, (Note: Both the Yazawin Thit and Hmannan Yazawin chronicles provide piecemeal information in different sections: In an earlier section, Thray Sithu of Myinsaing had an older brother Sithu Thanbawa—with no younger siblings mentioned.; In a later section, Thihapate was a younger brother of Sithu of Myinsaing.) whose parents were Prince Sithu Min Oo of Pinya and Princess Minkhaung Medaw of Ava (or Princess Saw Salaka Dewi of Ava). Thus, Thihapate was a grandson of King Uzana I of Pinya (r. 1325–1340) from his father's side, and a grandson of the then reigning king Swa Saw Ke of Ava (r. 1367–1400) from his mother side. (Note: His father Sithu Min Oo was a son of King Uzana I of Pinya. His potential mothers, Princesses Minkhaung Medaw and Saw Salaka Dewi, were both daughters of King Swa Saw Ke.)

== Governor of Taungdwin ==
=== Loyal vassal of Ava (1401–1425) ===
Thihapate was appointed governor of Taungdwin, located about 240 km south of the capital Ava (Inwa), by King Minkhaung I of Ava c. 1401. (Note: The chronicles all agree that he was appointed governor after Minkhaung's accession but not the actual year of appointment: Maha Yazawin and Hmannan Yazawin: 764 ME (1402/03), after Minkhaung's accession in 763 ME (1401/02); Yazawin Thit: 762 ME (1400/01), soon after Minkhaung's accession; The Maha Yazawin and Hmannan are incorrect about Minkhaung's accession date. According to inscriptional evidence, Minkhaung came to power on 25 November 1400.) He proved to be a loyal vassal, participating in all major military campaigns during Minkhaung's reign, including the Ava–Hanthawaddy War (1401–1403) and the Ava–Launggyet War (1406) to Ava–Hanthawaddy War (1408–1418). His loyalty continued under Minkhaung's successor King Thihathu of Ava (r. 1421–1425). He commanded a regiment in the Ava–Hanthawaddy War (1422–1423).

=== Ava succession crisis (1425–1426) ===
Thihapate supported King Min Nyo of Kale during the Ava succession crisis of 1425–1426. Nyo had seized the throne after his allies had assassinated King Thihathu and his successor Min Hla within a 3-month period. When Governor Thado of Mohnyin formally revolted in February 1426, (Note: Tabaung 787 ME = 6 February 1426 to 7 March 1426) Thihapate agreed to fight for Nyo. The king's commanders were Thihapate's brother Thray Sithu of Myinsaing and Le Than Bwa of Onbaung. Thihapate's Taungdwin regiment took up a defensive position around the capital Ava while Thray Sithu and Le Than Bwa advanced to the front.

Thihapate's loyalty to Nyo soon wavered. The Mohnyin army defeated Thray Sithu at Wetchet, and Le Than Bwa withdrew after receiving a substantial bribe from Thado. In early May 1426, as Thado's army closed in on Ava, Thihapate and two other lords defending the capital region—Minye Kyawhtin of Pakhan, Thinkhaya III of Toungoo—renounced their allegiance to Nyo, and returned to their regions. King Nyo and Queen Bo-Me fled the capital, and Thado entered Ava unopposed one day later, on 16 May 1426. (Note: Thursday, 10th waxing of Nayon 788 ME = 16 May 1426) King Nyo died on the run a few weeks later, and Queen Bo-Me was captured.

=== Nominal vassal (1426) ===
Thihapate was among several regional vassals who refused to submit to Thado. By August 1426, Thado had captured the royals with the highest claim to the throne: Prince Tarabya of Pakhan and Prince Minye Kyawhtin. The new king then focused on Taungdwin and Toungoo, and summoned both governors to Ava.

Despite deep reservations, Thihapate traveled to Ava, only after learning that Thinkhaya of Toungoo had made the same decision. As Toungoo (Taungoo) was directly southeast of Taungdwin, securing his eastern flank was essential. At the Ava Palace, Thihapate and Thinkhaya were received respectfully and given lavish gifts by the king. They, in turn, politely pledged their allegiance. However, Thado's eldest son, Crown Prince Minye Kyawswa urged his father not to allow the governors to return to their fiefs. Thado dismissed the advice.

To prove his loyalty, Thihapate agreed to track down Prince Minye Kyawhtin. The prince, pardoned in August, had never renounced his claim to the throne. He returned with a force supplied by Onbaung, and occupied Yenantha about 60 km northeast of Ava. Backed by a 15,000-strong force, Thihapate and Minister Yazathingyan, alongside the king's younger brother Nawrahta, easily drove out the prince's small army back to Onbaung.

Meanwhile, Thinkhaya revolted upon returning to Toungoo. Thihapate received permission to return to Taungdwin, ostensibly to defend his territory against Toungoo. However, upon arrival at Taungdwin, c. December 1426, (Note: Chronicles say the Taungdwin rebellion began right before the Mogaung rebellion which began "about eight months" after Thado's accession. This means the Mogaung rebellion began c. January 1427, and the Taungdwin rebellion probably began in c. December 1426.) Thihapate entered into an alliance with Thinkhaya, and renounced his allegiance to Thado.

== Independent rule (1426–c. 1441) ==
Thihapate's rebellion was part of the widespread opposition by vassal rulers to Thado's regime. Many vassal rulers viewed Thado as a usurper, and "at best a senior." Thado in turn viewed them as "self-serving spoilers" who "swore oaths of allegiance only to suit their needs." By early 1427, Thado faced multiple widespread rebellions around the kingdom, the most important of which was the rebellion by Prince Minye Kyawhtin, who had seized Pinle, only 70 km from Ava.

Thihapate became a junior partner in the Toungoo-led southern alliance. The ambitious ruler of Toungoo, Thinkhaya, had declared himself king, and allied with King Binnya Ran I of Hanthawaddy. Thihapate joined Thinkhaya when Toungoo seized the five irrigated districts of Yamethin region (northeast of Taungdwin, immediately north of Toungoo) in 1428–1429. Subsequently, the Shan state of Yatsauk, another former Ava vassal, joined the alliance to defend the region, including Taungdwin. However, Taungdwin apparently did not partake in the joint Hanthawaddy–Toungoo invasion into southern districts of Ava 1430–1431. (Note: Of the combined invasion force of 15,000, Hanthawaddy contributed 10,000 men while Toungoo contributed 5000.)

In the 1430s, Taungdwin and other former vassals benefited from Ava's policy to maintain the status quo. As early as 1429, Thado had given up on reunifying the peripheral states. His focus shifted to constructing Buddhist pagodas and monasteries in the central core regions along the Irrawaddy under his control. After the brief war with Hanthawaddy in 1430–1431, Thado did not launch any military campaigns for the rest of his reign aside from one minor expedition in 1433–1434. That dry season, Crown Prince Minye Kyawswa led a small army (5000 infantry, 300 cavalry and 120 elephants) on an expedition to the southern peripheral states in rebellion: Pinle, Taungdwin, and Toungoo. The army was too small to capture any of the fortified towns, and returned empty-handed in early 1434.

The end of Thihapate's independence began with the death of Thado in 1439. The new king, Minye Kyawswa, who had previously agitated his father to reunify the kingdom, immediately instituted a new policy to retake the rebel states. Ava forces first captured Mohnyin, the king's birthplace, and Kale (Kalay) in 1439–1440. In the following dry season, c. November 1440, another Ava army (7000 infantry, 400 cavalry, 20 elephants) marched south. The army failed to take the fortified towns of Pinle and Yamethin. Circa early 1441, the army marched to Taungdwin. Thihapate, for whatever reason, (Note: Chronicles do not provide a reason as to why Thihapate, who must have been in his 60s, would choose to fight in an open battle.) chose to engage the Ava army in an open battle rather than remaining inside his fortifications. He was defeated, and captured. The town fell. (The Ava army then marched to Toungoo where its ruler Min Saw Oo (Thinkhaya's son) was killed in action in another open battle, and the city was captured.)

It is unclear what happened to Thihapate afterwards as he is not mentioned again in the chronicles. King Minye Kyawswa appointed his cousin Thiri Zeya Thura as governor of the town.

== List of military campaigns ==
The following is a list of military campaigns in which Thihapate of Taungdwin is explicitly mentioned in the chronicles.

=== As Ava vassal ===
Campaign	Duration	Troops commanded (Note: Chronicle reported troop levels reduced by an order of magnitude per (Harvey 1925: 333–336))	Notes
Ava–Hanthawaddy War (1401–1403); Battle of Thaymathauk	December 1402	1 regiment (1000 troops)	Served in the Vanguard Army under Thado of Mohnyin
Ava–Launggyet War (1406)	November 1406	1 regiment (1000 troops)	Commanded a regiment in the Left Flank Division of the strike force
Ava–Hanthawaddy War (1408–1418); First Ava invasion of Hanthawaddy	April–August 1408	1 regiment (1000 troops)	Served in the Vanguard Army at the start, and the Rearguard Army during the retreat
Ava–Hanthawaddy War (1408–1418); Second Ava invasion of Hanthawaddy	October 1409–c. February 1410	1 regiment (1000 troops)	Served in the Vanguard Army under the command of Sithu of Yamethin
Ava–Hanthawaddy War (1408–1418); Battles of Prome and Talezi	December 1412 – March 1413	1 regiment	Served in the Royal Main Army of King Minkhaung I
Ava–Hanthawaddy War (1422–1423)	1422–1423	1 regiment (1000 troops)	Served in the invasion army under the command of Thado of Mohnyin
Ava succession crisis Campaign against Thado of Mohnyin	February–May 1426	1 regiment	Stationed in the Ava capital region; retreated when Mohnyin troops closed in
Campaign against Prince Minye Kyawhtin	late 1426	1 army (15,000 troops)	Co-led the campaign alongside Yazathingyan and Nawrahta of Northern Cavalry.

=== As independent ruler ===
Campaign	Duration	Troops commanded	Notes
Five Irrigated Districts campaign	1428–1429	not mentioned	Participated in Toungoo's capture of the Five Irrigated Districts of Yamethin
Battle of Taungdwin	late 1433–early 1434	not mentioned	Defended Taungdwin against Ava forces
Battle of Taungdwin	c. early 1441	not mentioned	Defeated and captured by Ava forces

== Bibliography ==
- Aung-Thwin, Michael A. (2017). Myanmar in the Fifteenth Century. Honolulu: University of Hawai'i Press. ISBN 978-0-8248-6783-6.
- Kala, U (2006) [1724]. Maha Yazawin (in Burmese). Vol. 1–3 (4th printing ed.). Yangon: Ya-Pyei Publishing.
- Maha Sithu (2012) [1798]. Kyaw Win; Thein Hlaing (eds.). Yazawin Thit (in Burmese). Vol. 1–3 (2nd ed.). Yangon: Ya-Pyei Publishing.
- Pan Hla, Nai (2005) [1968]. Razadarit Ayedawbon (in Burmese) (8th printing ed.). Yangon: Armanthit Sarpay.
- Royal Historical Commission of Burma (2003) [1832]. Hmannan Yazawin (in Burmese). Vol. 1–3. Yangon: Ministry of Information, Myanmar.
- Sein Lwin Lay, Kahtika U (2006) [1968]. Min Taya Shwe Hti and Bayinnaung: Ketumadi Taungoo Yazawin (in Burmese) (2nd printing ed.). Yangon: Yan Aung Sarpay.
- Than Tun (December 1959). "History of Burma: A.D. 1300–1400". Journal of Burma Research Society. XLII (II).

Thihapate III of Taungdwin Ava Born: c. 1370s Died: 1440s?
Preceded by himself as governor	Ruler of Taungdwin c. December 1426 – c. 1441	Succeeded by Thiri Zeya Thura
Preceded by Thihapate II of Taungdwin	Governor of Taungdwin c. 1401 – c. December 1426	Succeeded by himself as independent ruler
