= Thihapate =

Thihapate or Thihapatei was a royal, official and military title.

== Royalty ==
- Thihapate of Sagaing: King of Sagaing (r. 1352−64)
- Thihapate of Yamethin: governor of Yamethin (r. 1330s−40s)

== Governors ==
- Thihapate of Tagaung: governor of Tagaung (r. c. 1367−1400), also known as Nga Nauk Hsan
- Thihapate II of Taungdwin: governor of Taungdwin (r. c. 1360s–c. 1401)
- Thihapate III of Taungdwin: governor of Taungdwin (r. c. 1401–1441)
- Thihapate of Mohnyin: sawbwa of Mohnyin (r. 1442−1450/51)

== Generals ==
- Ne Myo Thihapate: Early Konbaung period general
