= Nan Oo Pagoda, Myinsaing =

Buddhist temple in Myinsaing, Myanmar

Nan Oo Pagoda of Myinsaing
- မြင်စိုင်း နန်းဦး ဘုရား
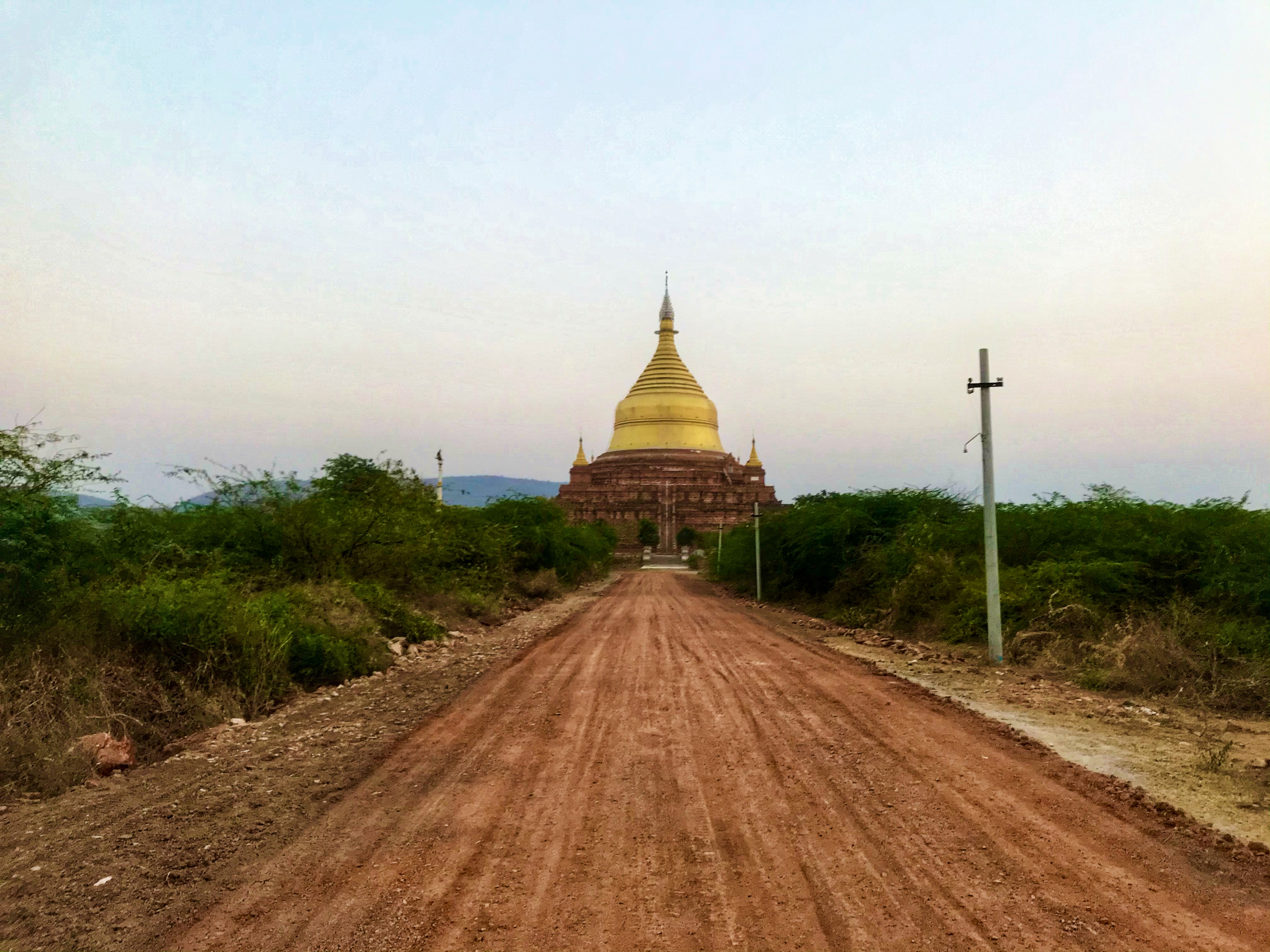
- Nan Oo Pagoda in 2021

Religion
- Affiliation: Buddhism
- Sect: Theravada Buddhism
- Region: Mandalay Region
- Year consecrated: 1301; 1329/30; 2004
- Status: active

Location
- Location: Myinsaing
- Country: Myanmar
- Interactive map of Nan Oo Pagoda of Myinsaing
- Coordinates: 21°35′56″N 96°12′02″E

Architecture
- Style: Pagan (Bagan)
- Founder: Athinkhaya (1301); Uzana I of Pinya (1329/30)
- Groundbreaking: 1301
- Completed: 1301; 1329/30

Specifications
- Length: 53 m (174 ft)
- Width: 53 m (174 ft)
- Height (max): over 53 m (174 ft)

The Nan Oo Pagoda of Myinsaing (Burmese: မြင်စိုင်း နန်းဦး ဘုရား, [mjɪ̀ɰ̃záɪɰ̃ náɰ̃ ʔú pʰəjá]) is a Buddhist stupa located in Myinsaing, Myanmar. Modeled after the Shwezigon Pagoda of Bagan, the over 53-metre (174 ft) tall pagoda is one of the main attractions of the historical old town area.

== History ==
The Nan Oo Pagoda (Note: Nan Oo (နန်းဦး) in Burmese means "Head of the Palace" or "First Palace".) was constructed alongside the Myinsaing Palace in commemoration of the Burmese victory over the Mongols in 1301. (Note: Chronicles do not agree on the date of construction: Maha Yazawin (1724): One year after the Mongols left in 666 ME (28 March 1304 – 28 March 1305).; Hmannan Yazawin (1832): After the Mongols left in 662 ME (28 March 1300 – 28 March 1301).; According to some accounts, the Mongols had retreated from Myinsaing by 8 April 1301.) Located 15 m (49 ft) south of the palace, the pagoda was founded as the "founding pagoda" (မြေစိုက် စေတီ) of the palace and of Myinsaing, then one of the three de facto capitals of the rump Pagan Kingdom.

In 1329/30, Athinkhaya's nephew, King Uzana I of Pinya enlarged the pagoda by building a surrounding structure that completely enveloped the original. (It was the second such project by Uzana. The first was the Shwezigon Pagoda in Mekkhaya, which too was built by enveloping the smaller Mahtaw Pagoda in 1325.) According to a 1329/30 stone inscription found at the Nan Oo Pagoda, the diameter of the outer stupa [not a side of the square base] was 47.09 m (154.5 ft). (Note: The stone inscription was translated into modern Burmese in 2010 by Maung Maung Lay (Retired Professor of Burmese, the University of Mandalay).)

The pagoda was in much disrepair by the early 20th century. A 1925 British colonial era report states that Myinsaing by then was "a brick-strewn area, which [contained] two large but much damaged pagodas", surrounded by "traces of the walls".

Restoration work was carried out only in 2004. Many artifacts had been lost, and could not be restored. For example, only two of the original terracotta votive tablets around the stupa have survived; one of them is chipped on the upper right hand corner. Not all parts of the restoration were historically accurate. A 2017 article in The Irrawaddy reported that modern "shiny" steel railings had been added on both sides of the staircases connecting the terraces.

== Present day ==
The Nan Oo Pagoda is one of the main attractions of the Myinsaing historical area. The topmost terrace of the pagoda is a popular viewpoint of the surroundings, including the nearby Myinsaing palace foundation, the remaining walls, and the moat as well as the paddy fields and small golden pagodas that dot the mountaintops around the Myinsaing valley.

As of 2017, Myinsaing was still off the beaten path. Only a dirt road connected the pagoda's premises and the ancient ramparts to the main road to nearby Kyaukse.

== Architecture ==
The Nan Oo pagoda was modeled after the Shwezigon Pagoda of Pagan (Bagan). Unlike the Shwezigon, however, the Nan Oo is an enveloping (encasing) pagoda—more specifically, of the most common "double encased" type. (Note: "Most are double encased monuments, but a few of them comprise triple encasements (Aung Kyaing, 2017).") According to a 2004 archaeological survey, both inner and outer stupas of the pagoda are solid structures. The survey found no spaces between the stupas, or any embedded relic chambers, shrines or cavities.

The outer stupa sits atop a 53 m (174 ft) by 53 m (174 ft) wide square foundation, and has three levels of square-shaped terraces as well as four staircases connecting the terraces (one from each side). At each corner of the base terrace sits a satellite stupa. The nyandaw (ဉာဏ်တော်; architectural height) of the pagoda without its hti spire is over 53 m (174 ft).

== Bibliography ==
- Aung-Thwin, Michael A. (2017). Myanmar in the Fifteenth Century. Honolulu: University of Hawai'i Press. ISBN 978-0-8248-6783-6.
- Htin Aung, Maung (1967). A History of Burma. New York and London: Cambridge University Press.
- Kala, U (2006) [1724]. Maha Yazawin (in Burmese). Vol. 1–3 (4th printing ed.). Yangon: Ya-Pyei Publishing.
- Maha Sithu (2012) [1798]. Kyaw Win; Thein Hlaing (eds.). Yazawin Thit (in Burmese). Vol. 1–3 (2nd ed.). Yangon: Ya-Pyei Publishing.
- "Cultural Heritage: Myinsaing Nan Oo Pagoda in Mandalay". Myanmar International TV (MITV). 12 October 2023.
- Myo Nyunt Aung (19 October 2022). "Comparing Encased Stupas in Thailand and Myanmar". Nakhara: Journal of Environmental Design and Planning. 21 (2). Bangkok: 213. doi:10.54028/NJ202221213.
- Neild, Ralph; Searle, H.F.; Stewart, J.A. (1925). "Kyaukse District". Burma Gazetteer. A. Rangoon: Government Printing and Stationery, Burma.
- Royal Historical Commission of Burma (2003) [1832]. Hmannan Yazawin (in Burmese). Vol. 1–3. Yangon: Ministry of Information, Myanmar.
- Tein Taman (27 September 2020). "မြင်စိုင်းနန်းဦးစေတီတွင် ရှေးဟောင်းဇာတ်တော် စဉ့်ကွင်းများနှင့် စဉ့်ကွင်းစာများကို ယနေ့တိုင်လေ့လာနိုင်" (in Burmese). Myanmar Digital News.
- Than Naing Oo (27 May 2017). "ကျောက်ဆည်လွင်ပြင်ထဲက မြင်စိုင်း". The Irrawaddy.
- Than Tun (December 1959). "History of Burma: A.D. 1300–1400". Journal of Burma Research Society. XLII (II).
- Than Tun (1964). Studies in Burmese History (in Burmese). Vol. 1. Yangon: Maha Dagon.
