= Thihapate of Yamethin =

Thihapate of Yamethin; ရမည်းသင်း သီဟပတေ့

Governor of Yamethin
- Reign: 1330s – 1351
- Predecessor: ?
- Successor: Swa Saw Ke
- Monarch: Uzana I; Sithu; Kyawswa I
- Born: c. late 1310s Pinya, Pinya Kingdom
- Died: c. 1351; Yamethin?, Pinya Kingdom
- House: Pinya
- Father: Uzana I
- Mother: Atula Maha Dhamma Dewi
- Religion: Theravada Buddhism

Thihapate of Yamethin (Burmese: သီဟပတေ့, [θìha̰pətḛ]; also known as Chauk-Hse Shin, lit. "Lord of Sixty Elephants") was governor of Yamethin in the 1330s and the 1340s during the Pinya Period. The second son of King Uzana I of Pinya considered a rebellion against his half-uncle Kyawswa I of Pinya who pushed out his father from power but ultimately decided against it.

== Brief ==
He was born Min Htwe to Crown Prince Uzana and his chief wife Atula Maha Dhamma Dewi. His father became king in 1325 but his half-uncle Kyawswa remained a serious rival to his father. Uzana was never able to consolidate power in the following years. Although Htwe was not the eldest son—Htwe had an older brother, Sithu Min Oo—Htwe came to be relied upon by his father. He was appointed governor of Yamethin with the title of Thihapate in the late 1330s. When his father lost the power struggle with Kyawswa between 1340 and 1344, Thihapate, who then commanded a standing regiment of 60 war elephants, 800 cavalry and 1000 infantry, seriously considered a rebellion against Kyawswa. But he failed to persuade Gov. Saw Mon Hnit of Nyaungyan to join him in rebellion. He finally agreed to submit to Kyawswa, who had sent a conciliatory gift—a rare black stallion from Onbaung.

His name does not appear in the royal chronicles afterwards. Given that he was no longer governor of Yamethin in 1351 as Swa Saw Ke became governor, (Note: Chronicles (Maha Yazawin Vol. 1 2006: 280) and (Hmannan Vol. 2003: 403) say Swa defected to Sagaing during the reign of Tarabya II of Sagaing (r. 1349–52). According to a contemporary inscription (Than Tun 1959: 128), he was still governor of Talok at age 21 (22nd year). Therefore he likely became governor of Yamethin sometime between 24 July 1351 (Swa's 21st birthday) and 23 February 1352 (Tarabya II's death).) Thihapate may have died by then, or may have been removed from office.

== Ancestry ==
Prince Min Htwe was descended from the Pagan royalty from both sides. His parents were half siblings, children of King Kyawswa of Pagan.

Ancestry of Thihapate of Yamethin

8. Narathihapate
4. Kyawswa of Pagan
9. Shin Hpa of Pagan
2. Uzana I of Pinya
10. Narathihapate
5. Mi Saw U
11. Shin Shwe of Pagan
1. Thihapate of Yamethin
12. Narathihapate
6. Kyawswa of Pagan
13. Shin Hpa of Pagan
3. Atula Maha Dhamma Dewi of Pinya
14. Yazathingyan of Pagan
7. Saw Soe of Pagan
15. Saw Khin Htut of Pagan

== Bibliography ==
- Kala, U (1724). Maha Yazawin (in Burmese). Vol. 1–3 (2006, 4th printing ed.). Yangon: Ya-Pyei Publishing.
- Royal Historical Commission of Burma (1832). Hmannan Yazawin (in Burmese). Vol. 1–3 (2003 ed.). Yangon: Ministry of Information, Myanmar.
- Than Tun (December 1959). "History of Burma: A.D. 1300–1400". Journal of Burma Research Society. XLII (II).

Thihapate of Yamethin Pinya Kingdom Born: c. 1310s Died: c. 1350s
Royal titles
Preceded by	Governor of Yamethin; 1330s – 1351	Succeeded by Swa Saw Ke
