= Sithu Min Oo =

Pretender to the Pinya throne (1310s–1370s)

Sithu Min Oo စည်သူ မင်းဦး

Prentender to the Pinya Throne
- Reign: 1325–1364
- Born: c. late 1310s Pinya; Pinya Kingdom
- Died: in or after c. 1370s Ava Kingdom
- Spouses: Minkhaung Medaw
- Issue: Sithu Thanbawa; Thray Sithu
- Father: Uzana I of Pinya
- Mother: Atula Maha Dhamma Dewi

Sithu Min Oo (Burmese: စည်သူ မင်းဦး, pronounced [sìðù mɪ́ɰ̃ ʔú]; c. late 1310s – in or after 1370s) was a longtime pretender to the Pinya throne from the 1320s to the 1360s. After Ava replaced Pinya as the new power in present-day central Myanmar in 1365, Sithu entered into an alliance with King Swa Saw Ke of Ava by marrying Swa's daughter Minkhaung Medaw. Kings Mingyi Nyo, Tabinshwehti and Nanda of the Toungoo dynasty were descended from him.

== Brief ==
Sithu Min Oo was the elder of the two children of Princess Atula Maha Dhamma Dewi and Crown Prince Uzana I of Pinya. In 1325, by primogeniture, he technically became the heir presumptive when his father ascended to the Pinya throne. However, Sithu probably was never officially recognized as the heir apparent throughout his father's much contested reign. The de facto heir apparent, according to the royal chronicles, was Uzana's half-brother Prince Kyawswa, who maintained his own army and conducted his own policy. Nor was Sithu viewed as a potential successor by his own father, who relied much more on the younger son Thihapate Min Htwe. Whereas the king appointed Htwe governor of Yamethin, and gave command of a regiment (1000 troops, 800 cavalry and 60 war elephants), chronicles do not report any appointments whatsoever for Sithu.

Perhaps because of his low profile, Sithu managed to survive the subsequent palace intrigues to the 1360s. He was not purged when Kyawswa consolidated the power in the early 1340s. (Kyawswa viewed Thihapate Min Htwe, who seriously considered a rebellion, as a threat.) While Thihapate is not heard from again after 1351, Sithu lived through the fall of Pinya in 1364, and the rise of the new kingdom at Ava (Inwa) in 1365. He was apparently still viewed as an eminence grise then. Swa Saw Ke, who became king of Ava 1367, gave his teenage daughter Minkhaung Medaw in a marriage alliance to Sithu. (Note: The Yazawin Thit chronicle (Yazawin Thit Vol. 1 2012: 206) says Princess Minkhaung Medaw, the third daughter of King Swa and Queen Khame Mi, was the mother of the Sithu brothers. But the Hmannan Yazawin chronicle (Hmannan Vol. 1 2003: 436) says Princess Saw Salaka Dewi, the second daughter, was the mother of the brothers. However, Hmannan's reporting is inconsistent; it is missing the information on the third daughter even though Hmannan itself says the royal couple had three daughters and two sons.)

It is through this marriage that Sithu the elder is remembered. The couple had two sons, Sithu Thanbawa and Thray Sithu. Through Sithu Thanbawa, his descendants included kings Mingyi Nyo, Tabinshwehti, and Nanda of the Toungoo dynasty.

== Ancestry ==
The prince was descended from the Pagan royalty from both sides. His parents were half-siblings, children of King Kyawswa of Pagan.

Ancestry of Prince Sithu Min Oo

8. Narathihapate
4. Kyawswa of Pagan
9. Shin Hpa
2. Uzana I of Pinya
10. Narathihapate
5. Mi Saw U
11. Shin Shwe of Pagan
1. Sithu Min Oo
12. Narathihapate
6. Kyawswa of Pagan
13. Shin Hpa
3. Atula Maha Dhamma Dewi of Pinya
14. Yazathingyan
7. Saw Soe of Pagan
15. Saw Khin Htut of Pagan

== Bibliography ==
- Kala, U (2006) [1724]. Maha Yazawin (in Burmese). Vol. 1–3 (4th printing ed.). Yangon: Ya-Pyei Publishing.
- Maha Sithu (2012) [1798]. Kyaw Win; Thein Hlaing (eds.). Yazawin Thit (in Burmese). Vol. 1–3 (2nd printing ed.). Yangon: Ya-Pyei Publishing.
- Royal Historical Commission of Burma (2003) [1832]. Hmannan Yazawin (in Burmese). Vol. 1–3. Yangon: Ministry of Information, Myanmar.
- Sein Lwin Lay, Kahtika U (2006) [1968]. Min Taya Shwe Hti and Bayinnaung: Ketumadi Taungoo Yazawin (in Burmese) (2nd printing ed.). Yangon: Yan Aung Sarpay.
