= Shin Shwe of Pagan =

Shin Shwe ရှင်ရွှေ

Queen consort of Burma
- Tenure: c. 1270 – 1287
- Spouse: Narathihapate
- Issue: Sithu of Pinya; Mi Saw U
- House: Pagan
- Religion: Theravada Buddhism

Shin Shwe (Burmese: ရှင်ရွှေ, pronounced [ʃɪ̀ɴ ʃwè]) was a principal queen consort of King Narathihapate of the Pagan Dynasty of Burma (Myanmar). She was the mother of Queen Mi Saw U of Pagan and later Pinya, and the maternal grandmother of kings Uzana I of Pinya and Kyawswa I of Pinya.

== Bibliography ==
- Royal Historical Commission of Burma (1832). Hmannan Yazawin (in Burmese). Vol. 1–3 (2003 ed.). Yangon: Ministry of Information, Myanmar.
