= Minkhaung Medaw of Ava =

Minkhaung Medaw မင်းခေါင် မယ်တော်
- Born: c. early 1350s Talok or Yamethin, Pinya Kingdom (or Amyint, Sagaing Kingdom) (Note: Depending on when she was born, her birth place was probably Talok, Yamethin or Amyint where her father Swa Saw Ke was governor during the late 1340s and the early 1350s. Chronicles (Maha Yazawin Vol. 1 2006: 280) and (Hmannan Vol. 2003: 403) say Swa defected to Sagaing during the reign of Tarabya II of Sagaing (r. 1349–52). According to a contemporary inscription (Than Tun 1959: 128), he was still governor of Talok at age 21 (22nd year). Therefore he likely became governor of Yamethin sometime between 24 July 1351 (Swa's 21st birthday) and 23 February 1352 (Tarabya II's death).)
- Died: ? Ava Kingdom
- Spouse: Sithu Min Oo
- Issue: Sithu Thanbawa; Thray Sithu of Myinsaing
- House: Pinya
- Father: Swa Saw Ke
- Mother: Khame Mi
- Religion: Theravada Buddhism

Minkhaung Medaw (Burmese: မင်းခေါင် မယ်တော်, pronounced [mɪ́ɴɡàʊɴ mɛ̀dɔ̀]; b. c. 1350s) was a Burmese princess in the early Ava period. The youngest daughter of Swa Saw Ke and Khame Mi, she became a princess in 1367 when her father ascended to the Ava throne. The princess was married to Prince Sithu Min Oo of Pinya, (Note: The Yazawin Thit chronicle (Yazawin Thit Vol. 1 2012: 206) says Princess Minkhaung Medaw, the third daughter of King Swa and Queen Khame Mi, was the mother of the Sithu brothers. However, the Hmannan Yazawin chronicle (Hmannan Vol. 1 2003: 436) says Princess Saw Salaka Dewi, the middle daughter, was the mother of the brothers. However, Hmannan's reporting is inconsistent: even though Hmannan says the royal couple had three daughters and two sons, it does not provide any information about the third daughter. The paragraph seems to be missing sentences.) who was probably at least four decades her senior, perhaps in a marriage alliance arranged by her father. The couple had two children: Sithu Thanbawa and Thray Sithu of Myinsaing. Kings Mingyi Nyo, Tabinshwehti and Nanda of the Toungoo dynasty were descended from her.

== Ancestry ==
The princess was descended from the Pagan royal line from her paternal side.

Ancestry of Princess Minkhaung Medaw of Ava

8. Kyawswa of Pagan
4. Min Shin Saw of Thayet
9. Shin Hpa of Pagan
2. Swa Saw Ke of Ava
10. Thihathu of Prome
5. Shin Myat Hla of Prome
11. Atula Dewi of Prome
1. Minkhaung Medaw
12. unknown
6. unknown
13. unknown
3. Khame Mi
14. unknown
7. unknown
15. unknown

== Bibliography ==
- Kala, U (2006) [1724]. Maha Yazawin (in Burmese). Vol. 1–3 (4th printing ed.). Yangon: Ya-Pyei Publishing.
- Maha Sithu (2012) [1798]. Kyaw Win; Thein Hlaing (eds.). Yazawin Thit (in Burmese). Vol. 1–3 (2nd ed.). Yangon: Ya-Pyei Publishing.
- Royal Historical Commission of Burma (2003) [1832]. Hmannan Yazawin (in Burmese). Vol. 1–3. Yangon: Ministry of Information, Myanmar.
- Than Tun (December 1959). "History of Burma: A.D. 1300–1400". Journal of Burma Research Society. XLII (II).
