= Atula Maha Dhamma Dewi of Pinya =

Atula Maha Dhamma Dewi အတုလ မဟာဓမ္မဒေဝီ

Chief queen consort of Pinya
- Reign: c. February 1325 – 1 September 1340
- Predecessor: Mi Saw U
- Successor: Saw Htut
- Born: c. 1295; Pagan (Bagan)
- Died: Unknown; Pinya?
- Spouse: Uzana I of Pinya
- Issue: Sithu Min Oo; Thihapate
- House: Pinya
- Father: Kyawswa of Pagan
- Mother: Saw Soe of Pagan
- Religion: Theravada Buddhism

Atula Maha Dhamma Dewi (Burmese: အတုလ မဟာဓမ္မဒေဝီ, pronounced [ʔətṵla̰ məhà dəma̰dèwì]; Pali: Atulamahādhammadevī) was the chief queen consort of King Uzana I of Pinya. Uzana I was her half-brother. She was a paternal aunt of King Swa Saw Ke of Ava.

== Bibliography ==
- Royal Historical Commission of Burma (2003) [1832]. Hmannan Yazawin (in Burmese). Vol. 1–3. Yangon: Ministry of Information, Myanmar.

Atula Maha Dhamma Dewi of Pinya Pinya Kingdom Born: c. 1295
Royal titles
Preceded by Mi Saw U	Chief queen consort of Pinya c. February 1325 – 1 September 1340	Succeeded by Saw Htut
