= Myinsaing =

Myinsaing မြင်စိုင်း
- Location in Myanmar
- Coordinates: 21°36′N 96°12′E (Note: Based on the geo coordinates of the Nan Oo Pagoda, Myinsaing.)
- Country: Myanmar
- Region: Mandalay
- District: Kyaukse District
- Township: Kyaukse Township
- Village tract: Hngetkataung
- Time zone: UTC+6.30 (MMT)

Myinsaing (Burmese: မြင်စိုင်း, pronounced [mjɪ̀ɰ̃ záɪɰ̃]; also transliterated as Myinzaing) is a historical site, located in Kyaukse Township, Mandalay Region, Myanmar. It was one of the three de facto capitals of Myanmar from 1297 to 1310 during the Myinsaing period. In the present day, the historical capital area is known as the Myinsaing Old Town (မြင်စိုင်း မြို့ဟောင်း). To its north lies a settlement known colloquially as "Myinsaing Village".

== History ==
=== Early history ===
According to the royal chronicles, Myinsaing in the 1170s was a small settlement that later became part of the Nine Irrigated Districts (ရေလွှဲ ကိုးခရိုင်) of Kyaukse. (Note: Queen Weluwaddy (r. 1174–1186) was born in Myinsaing. The earliest of the nine districts were founded by King Sithu II (r. 1174–1211), Weluwaddy's husband. Kyaukse was the administrative center of the districts, which consisted of five districts along the Zawgyi River and four along the Panlaung River.) The settlement is mentioned in a 1266 stone inscription. (Note: The inscription describes a series of religious donations by the daughter of Minister Thingathu. The donations were made on Thursday, the 7th waxing of Wagaung 628 ME, which translates to Friday, 9 July 1266. If it was on a Thursday, the date should be 8 July 1266.) It remained a small village until the 1280s when the Mongol invasions toppled the Pagan Empire, and Myinsaing's native sons—the brothers Athinkhaya, Yazathingyan and Thihathu—emerged as the main power brokers in the postwar era. By 1293, Myinsaing was a myo (မြို့) a district-level town ruled by a royal governor, Athinkhaya. (Note: It may have become a myo as early as 1289, the year of King Kyawswa's accession. Chronicles do not agree on who was appointed governor of Myinsaing by Kyawswa: The Maha Yazawin chronicle (1724) says Yazathingyan was appointed governor of Myinsaing by King Kyawswa.; The Yazawin Thit (1798) says Athinkhaya was appointed governor of Myinsaing.; The Hmannan Yazawin (1832) accepts the Yazawin Thit's correction.; Per inscriptional evidence, Kyawswa became king on 30 May 1289. Furthermore, a contemporary inscription, dated 19 February 1293, states that the brothers were lords of Myinsaing, Mekkhaya and Pinle.)

=== Myinsaing period ===
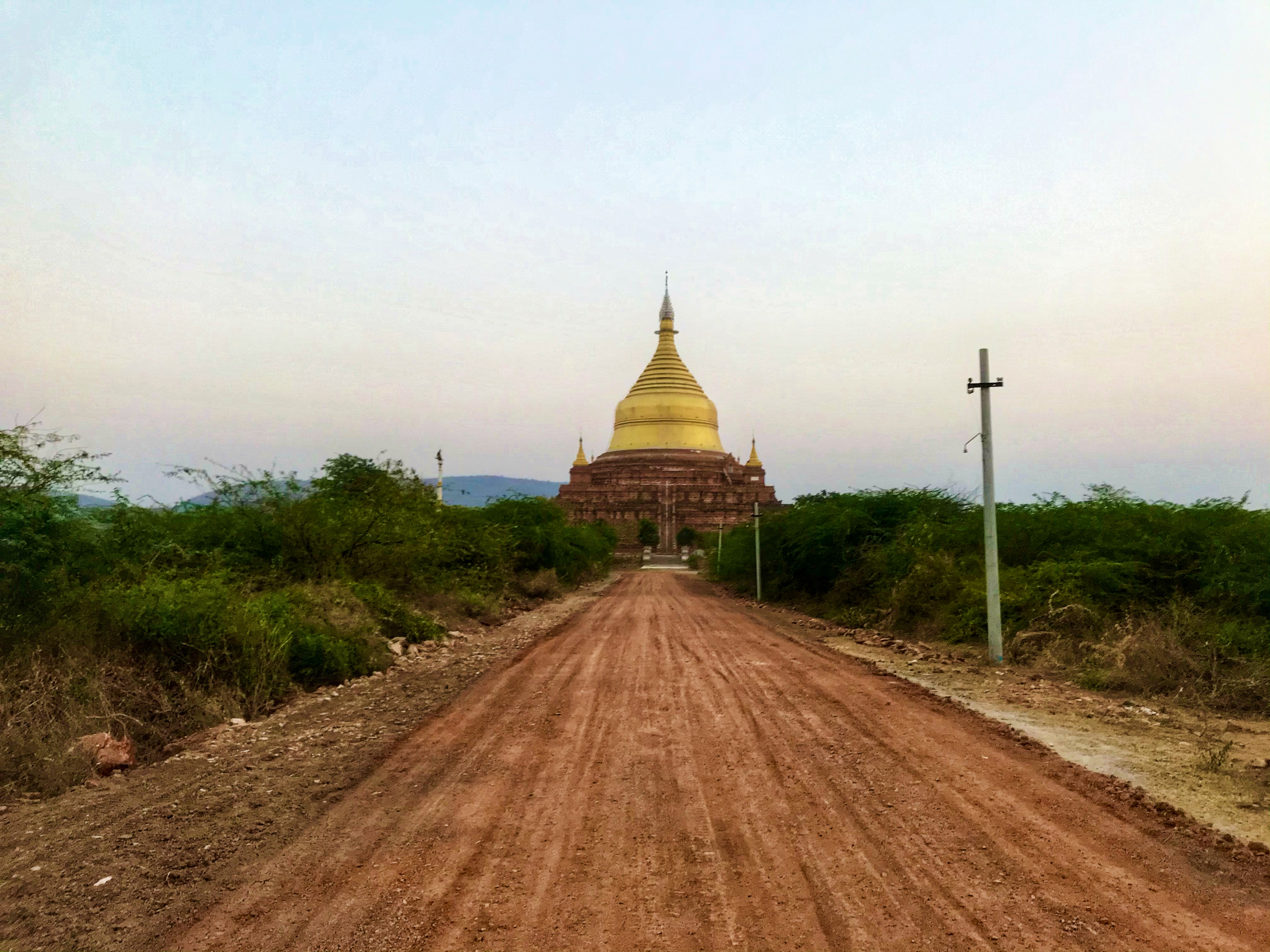
Nan Oo Pagoda in Myinsaing.

Myinsaing became one of the three de facto capitals of the rump kingdom in 1297 when the brothers overthrew King Kyawswa for having submitted to the Mongols earlier in the year. The brothers put up a puppet king in Pagan (Bagan) but they effectively ruled the kingdom out of their respective fiefs: Myinsaing, Mekkhaya and Pinle. To be sure, Myinsaing was the primary capital of the three. When the Mongols invaded again in 1301, it was at Myinsaing where the brothers made their last stand. The town's fortified defenses with triple adjoining ramparts withstood a 10-week siege by the Mongols who withdrew after receiving a bribe. (Note: The siege began on 25 January 1301. Upon receiving a bribe of 800 taels (30 kg) of gold and 2200 taels (83 kg) of silver, the Mongol army withdrew between 6 April 1301 and 8 April 1301.)

In commemoration of the victory, Athinkhaya built the Nan Oo Pagoda as well as a proper palace in 1301. Myinsaing's status as the premier de facto capital ended when Athinkhaya died in 1310. The youngest brother Thihathu, based out of Pinle, emerged as the undisputed ruler, and chose to build a new capital at Pinya, 40 km (25 mi) northwest of Myinsaing, in 1313.

=== Post-Myinsaing period ===
Myinsaing remained a symbolically important fief for another century. Its governorship was held by the closest members of the royal family including Gov. Sithu of Myinsaing, who served as the regent of the Pinya Kingdom between 1340 and 1344, and Prince Thray Sithu of Myinsaing (r. 1386–1426). During the Ava–Hanthawaddy War (1401–1403), Myinsaing was listed as one of the 53 or 54 fortified towns of Ava.

By 1802/03, it was no longer a royal governorship but instead was governed by a mayor, myothugyi (မြို့သူကြီး). (Note: Per the two extant sittans (စစ်တန်း; lit. 'census') of 1164 ME (1802/03 CE) and 1239 ME (1877/78 CE) by the myothugyis of Myinsaing) It was still an appanage awarded to members of the royal family. Its last feudal lord was Prince Thado Minye Yanshein, better known as the "Myinsaing Prince", who after the Third Anglo-Burmese War continued the fight against the British until 1886. A 1925 British colonial era report states that the Myinsaing old town by then was "a brick-strewn area, which [contained] two large but much damaged pagodas", surrounded by "traces of the walls".

== Present day ==
Today, Myinsaing is part of the Kyaukse Township. The historical old town is located about 7 km (4.3 mi) east of Kyaukse town. Its main attraction is the Nan Oo Pagoda, which has been partially repaired. (Note: The pagoda is no longer brick strewn but most of the original stoneworks around the pagoda have been lost. Only two of the original votive tablets have survived; one of which is chipped on the upper righthand corner.) Other areas of interest include traces of the three rings of ancient ramparts and the excavated foundation base of the old palace inside the walls.

North of the old town along the road to the Kyaukse Industrial Zone lies a settlement known colloquially as "Myinsaing Village". Neither the old town nor the village appears to be incorporated as a village or ward under the name of Myinsaing. Burmese government maps of Kyaukse Township from 2019 and 2020 show the area immediately east of Kyaukse town as Taungnatha (တောင်နံ့သာ). (Note: Myinsaing was not explicitly listed as an officially incorporated "ward" or "village tract" in the 2014 census. A 2019 General Administration Department (GAD) report shows the area immediately east of Kyaukse town's boundary as Taungnatha, and as being part of the Hngetkataung village tract. A 2020 government map also shows the area east of Kyaukse as Taungnatha.) At any rate, a 2017 article in The Irrawaddy states that the "large village" of "Myinsaing" had a post-primary school and a few district-level offices, and that new wards were being planned.

== Transport ==
Myinsaing is part of the Kyaukse road network. The modern village is situated alongside the Kyaukse–Hpyauk Seik Pin Road that connects Kyaukse in the west to the Kyaukse Industrial Zone in the east. In 2017, a 0.8 km (0.50 mi) long dirt road connected the old town and the main road, which in turn was connected to National Highway 1 via the Kyaukse 15th Street Exit.

== See also ==
- List of rulers of Myinsaing

== Bibliography ==
- Aung-Thwin, Michael A. (2017). Myanmar in the Fifteenth Century. Honolulu: University of Hawai'i Press. ISBN 978-0-8248-6783-6.
- Harvey, G. E. (1925). History of Burma: From the Earliest Times to 10 March 1824. London: Frank Cass & Co. Ltd.
- Htin Aung, Maung (1967). A History of Burma. New York and London: Cambridge University Press.
- Kala, U (2006) [1724]. Maha Yazawin (in Burmese). Vol. 1–3 (4th printing ed.). Yangon: Ya-Pyei Publishing.
- Maha Sithu (2012) [1798]. Kyaw Win; Thein Hlaing (eds.). Yazawin Thit (in Burmese). Vol. 1–3 (2nd ed.). Yangon: Ya-Pyei Publishing.
- Mya Myintzu; Moe Moe Pyone; Kyaw Min (2020). "Prince Myinzaing and Early Armed Resistance Movements". Meiktila University Research Journal. XI (1). Meiktila: Meiktila University.
- Myanmar Information Management Unit (MIMU) (2017). The 2014 Myanmar Population and Housing Census: Mandalay Region, Kyaukse District, Kyaukse Township Report (PDF). Naypyidaw: Department of Population, Ministry of Labour, Immigration and Population, Myanmar.
- Myanmar Information Management Unit (September 2019). Kyaukse Myone Daetha-hsaing-ya Achet-alet Mya ကျောင်ဆည် မြို့နယ် ဒေသဆိုင်ရာ အချက်အလက်များ [Kyaukse Township Regional Information] (PDF) (Report) (in Burmese). MIMU.
- Neild, Ralph; Searle, H.F.; Stewart, J.A. (1925). "Kyaukse District". Burma Gazetteer. A. Rangoon: Government Printing and Stationery, Burma.
- Royal Historical Commission of Burma (2003) [1832]. Hmannan Yazawin (in Burmese). Vol. 1–3. Yangon: Ministry of Information, Myanmar.
- Taw, Sein Ko; Emanuel Forchhammer; Tun Nyein (1899). Inscriptions of Pagan, Pinya and Ava: Translation, with Notes. Rangoon: Archaeological Survey of India.
- Tein Taman (27 September 2020). "မြင်စိုင်းနန်းဦးစေတီတွင် ရှေးဟောင်းဇာတ်တော် စဉ့်ကွင်းများနှင့် စဉ့်ကွင်းစာများကို ယနေ့တိုင်လေ့လာနိုင်" (in Burmese). Myanmar Digital News.
- Than Naing Oo (27 May 2017). "ကျောက်ဆည်လွင်ပြင်ထဲက မြင်စိုင်း". The Irrawaddy.
- Than Tun (December 1959). "History of Burma: A.D. 1300–1400". Journal of Burma Research Society. XLII (II).
- Than Tun (1964). Studies in Burmese History (in Burmese). Vol. 1. Yangon: Maha Dagon.
