= Mi Saw U =

Mi Saw U မိစောဦး

Chief queen consort of Pinya
- Tenure: 7 February 1313 – c. February 1325
- Predecessor: new office
- Successor: Atula Maha Dhamma Dewi

Chief queen consort of Pinle
- Tenure: 17 December 1297 – 7 February 1313
- Coronation: 20 October 1309
- Predecessor: new office
- Successor: disestablished

Queen of the Central Palace of Pagan
- Tenure: 1290s – 17 December 1297
- Predecessor: vacant
- Successor: disestablished
- Born: Pagan (Bagan)
- Died: Pinya
- Spouse: Kyawswa (1289–1297); Thihathu (1297–1325)
- Issue: Uzana I Kyawswa I Nawrahta
- House: Pagan
- Father: Narathihapate
- Mother: Shin Shwe
- Religion: Theravada Buddhism

Mi Saw U (Burmese: မိစောဦး, pronounced [mḭ sɔ́ ʔú]; also known as Min Saw U) was a Pagan princess, who was queen of two kings, Kyawswa of Pagan and Thihathu of Pinya, and mother of two kings, Uzana I of Pinya and Kyawswa I of Pinya. Saw U was a daughter of Narathihapate, the last sovereign king of Pagan. Married to her half-brother Kyawswa, Saw U was pregnant with Kyawswa's child (Uzana) in December 1297 when she was seized by Thihathu who had just overthrown Kyawswa. Thihathu raised Uzana as his own child and later selected him as heir apparent. Saw U also gave birth to Thihathu's child, also named Kyawswa. Both Uzana and Kyawswa went on to become kings of Pinya. Her youngest son Nawrahta defected to the Sagaing Kingdom c. 1349 after a disagreement with his brother Kyawswa.

== Bibliography ==
- Harvey, G. E. (1925). History of Burma: From the Earliest Times to 10 March 1824. London: Frank Cass & Co. Ltd.
- Htin Aung, Maung (1967). A History of Burma. New York and London: Cambridge University Press.
- Luce, G.H.; Pe Maung Tin (1923). The Glass Palace Chronicle of the Kings of Burma (1960 ed.). Rangoon University Press.
- Royal Historical Commission of Burma (1832). Hmannan Yazawin (in Burmese). Vol. 1–3 (2003 ed.). Yangon: Ministry of Information, Myanmar.

Mi Saw U Pagan Dynasty
Royal titles
New title	Chief queen consort of Pinya; 7 February 1313 – February 1325	Succeeded by Atula Maha Dhamma Dewi
New title	Chief queen consort of Pinle; 17 December 1297 – 7 February 1313	Succeeded by Yadanabon
Vacant	Queen of the Central Palace of Pagan; 1290s – 17 December 1297	None; Pagan Kingdom replaced by Pinya
