= Uzana I of Pinya =

Uzana I of Pinya ပင်းယ ဥဇနာ

King of Pinya
- Reign: c. February 1325 – 1 September 1340
- Predecessor: Thihathu
- Successor: Sithu
- Chief Minister: Ananda Pyissi
- Born: June 1298; Tuesday, Waso 660 ME; Pinle, Myinsaing Regency
- Died: c. 1356/1357 (aged 58) c. 718 ME; Mekkhaya, Pinya Kingdom
- Consort: Atula Maha Dhamma Dewi
- Issue: Sithu Min Oo; Thihapate; Saw Pa Oh; Mway Medaw
Names
- Anawrahta Maha Dipati
- House: Myinsaing
- Father: Kyawswa of Pagan
- Mother: Mi Saw U
- Religion: Theravada Buddhism

Uzana I of Pinya (Burmese: ပင်းယ ဥဇနာ, pronounced [ʔṵzənà]; 1298 – 1356/1357) was king of Pinya from 1325 to 1340. Of Pagan royalty, Uzana inherited a disunited kingdom, which fell apart right after his predecessor Thihathu's death. Not only could he not retake the northern Sagaing Kingdom but he also had little control over his southern vassals. Even in his core power base in present-day central Myanmar (Burma), Uzana faced a serious rival in his half-brother Kyawswa. He ultimately lost the power struggle, and abdicated the throne in 1340 to a regent. He lived out his last years as a monk in Mekkhaya.

== Early life ==
Born in June 1298, (Note: (Hmannan Vol. 1 2003: 379): His mother was three months pregnant when his father was overthrown. Per (Than Tun 1959: 119), Kyawswa was dethroned on 17 December 1297.) Uzana was the biological child of King Kyawswa of Pagan (r. 1289–97) and Queen Mi Saw U. By his birth, his father had been dethroned for six months, and his mother had been taken by Thihathu, one of the three brothers and former Pagan generals who overthrew Kyawswa. Adopted at birth by Thihathu, co-regent of the newly founded Myinsaing Kingdom, Uzana never knew his biological father who was executed on the orders of the three regents in 1299. The young prince grew up in Pinle with Thihathu's children: his two maternal half-siblings Kyawswa and Nawrahta as well as his step-siblings Tarabya, Saw Yun and Saw Pale.

Perhaps because of his Pagan royal descent, Uzana grew up being a key scion of the Myinsaing ruling house. His stepfather Thihathu, who consolidated power in the following decade, was eager to be seen as a legitimate successor to the Pagan line. On 7 February 1313 at the newly built capital at Pinya, Thihathu proclaimed himself the rightful successor of the Pagan Dynasty, with the dowager queen Pwa Saw of Pagan presenting him the golden belt and the golden tray of the 11th century King Anawrahta. In the same coronation ceremony, he also pronounced Mi Saw U, daughter of King Narathihapate, his chief queen consort, and Uzana his heir-apparent. He also appointed Kyawswa, his eldest son by Mi Saw U, governor of Pinle.

== Heir-apparent ==
Uzana's appointment was resented by Thihathu's biological sons. In particular, Saw Yun, whose mother was a commoner, resented being treated as a second-class royal, not only behind his stepbrother Uzana but also behind his half-brother Kyawswa. He constantly agitated his father for more power. Thihathu appointed Saw Yun governor of Sagaing, across the Irrawaddy, in 1314. Even then, Saw Yun still resented that he was not allowed to command as large a force as Uzana or Kyawswa, and that he had to constantly beg for cavalry and war elephants from his brothers. On 15 May 1315, after another disagreement with his father, Saw Yun walked out of the Pinya Palace, never to return. At first, Thihathu dismissed his teenage son's insubordination. But Saw Yun spent the next year consolidating his support around Sagaing and in the north, and went on to upgrade Sagaing's timber walls with a brick wall by March 1316.

Uzana now faced a test. Thihathu now asked Uzana to retake Sagaing, saying it was as a test to prove the latter's worth as crown prince. But Thihathu order seemed halfhearted. Because the king never mobilized all his forces, Uzana had to use the small army under his command (about 1000 men, 80 horses, 10 elephants). Uzana's expedition never made it to Sagaing as they were driven back at the Irrawaddy crossing. Back at the Pinya Palace, Thihathu treated a defeated Uzana with contempt, saying he had failed the test. The king now ordered Kyawswa to lead another expedition, also presenting it as a test. The second expedition by Kyawswa also failed.

Uzana and Kyawswa were to get a chance to redeem themselves. The Sagaing rebellion in the north begot instabilities in the south in Taungdwin and Toungoo (Taungoo). Taungdwin submitted but Toungoo required an expedition. In 1317–18, Uzana and Kyawswa with a combined force marched to Toungoo, and got its ruler Thawun Nge to submit.

The Sagaing affair remained unresolved. It is unclear if Sagaing could have been taken if Thihathu ordered a larger expedition as he did with Toungoo. But the king accepted Saw Yun's nominal submission, and did not again order another attack. Though Uzana remained the official crown prince, Saw Yun was already the de facto ruler of the northern country. Thihathu was resigned to the fact that his kingdom would be split into two after his death.

== Reign ==
=== Rivalry with Kyawswa ===
The Pinya kingdom formally separated into two at Thihathu's death in 1325. Uzana succeeded as king with the title of Anawrahta Maha Dipati, with his half-sister Atula Maha Dhamma Dewi as chief queen consort. Uzana's rump Pinya Kingdom ruled the eastern and southern Central Burma while Saw Yun's Sagaing Kingdom ruled the northern and western parts. Uzana's Pinya should be the stronger of the two since it still controlled two out of the three main irrigated regions, Kyaukse and Minbu, whereas Sagaing controlled only the Mu valley. But in reality, Uzana never had much control of his remaining vassals. Indeed, his main rival was not Saw Yun but his half-brother Kyawswa, who openly held court at Pinle, just a few miles away from Pinya and also in the all-important Kyaukse region. Kyawswa still controlled his own army, and conducted his own policy. It was Kyawswa, not Uzana, who famously ordered his commander Khin Nyo to assassinate Saw Yun.

According to the chronicles, Uzana formed the following special military units, that responded only to him. The list shows that Uzana's core power base extended no more than 150 km from Pinya. His power base overlapped with that of Kyawswa, who had his own specialized military units.

Region	Cavalry	Shielded knights	Archers
Pinya	300		
Thingyi	300	300	
Nyaungyan	300	300	300
Kyauksauk	40	40	
Lanbu	40		
Thindaung	30		
Yet-Khant Kan-Zaunt	30		

=== Nominal vassals ===
The rivalry greatly limited Pinya's power. Its southernmost vassals were practically independent, and had to fend for themselves. Pinya took no action with the 1325 assassination of Saw Hnit, the Pinya-recognized ruler of Toungoo, and had to be satisfied with the usurper Kayin Ba's nominal submission. Nor did it command any respect from its neighbors, which regularly breached its borders. Pinya took no action when Ramanya attacked Prome (Pyay) in 1330, or when Arakan attacked Thayet in 1334.

At any rate, Uzana's main concern remained Kyawswa. In the 1330s, Kyawswa consolidated power, and increasingly acted as a sovereign. The inevitable confrontation came to a head when Kyawswa found five rare white elephants, which were symbols of monarchs. When Uzana asked for them twice, Kyawswa openly refused both times.

== Abdication ==
The refusals signaled war but Uzana ultimately backed down, and decided to abdicate. Most chronicles say that he abdicated the throne to Kyawswa in 1342/43 after a period of 4 years. (Note: Yazawin Thit (Yazawin Thit Vol. 1 2012: 166) gives a year earlier, 703 ME (1341/42).) Inscriptional evidence shows that Uzana first handed power to Gov. Sithu of Myinsaing, uncle and father-in-law of Kyawswa, on 1 September 1340. (Note: (Than Tun 1959) simply gives 1 September 1340, which translates to Friday, 10th waxing of Tawthalin 702 ME (Friday, 1 September 1340).) (Another contemporary inscription shows that he was still king on 9 July 1340. (Note: Sunday, Full Moon of Waso 702 ME (Sunday, 9 July 1340))) Uzana became a monk at Mekkhaya. Sithu's regency may have been a face-saving measure for Uzana but Kyawswa apparently did not recognize Sithu either. According to an inscription donated on 17 June 1342 by Kyawswa's chief queen consort Atula Sanda Dewi, Kyawswa had already claimed himself king. Inscriptions show that Sithu officially handed over the reins to Kyawswa on 29 March 1344.

Uzana remained a monk at Mekkhaya, and died at age 58.

== Family ==
Uzana had at least two sons, Sithu Min Oo and Thihapate, and two daughters, Saw Pa Oh and Mway Medaw of Lanbu, who according to the chronicle Alaungpaya Ayedawbon was an ancestor of King Mohnyin Thado and the Konbaung kings. Thihapate was a powerful governor of Yamethin in the 1340s, and contemplated a rebellion against Kyawswa I. Saw Pa Oh became queen of King Kyaswa of Sagaing.

== Chronicle reporting differences ==
The royal chronicles do not necessarily agree on his birth, death or reign dates. None of the major chronicles mentions Sithu's regency although they do recognize that Uzana became a hermit for about 4 years. Chronicles count Uzana's reign to the handover to Kyawswa, 20 or 22 years. Inscriptions show that Uzana's reign would have been 19 years if it is counted to Kyawswa's undisputed takeover in 1344.

Source	Birth–Death	Age at abdication	Reign	Length of reign	Reference
Zatadawbon Yazawin	c. 1301 – c. 1359	41 (42nd year)	1322/23 – 1342/43	20	(Note: Zata is inconsistent. (Zata 1960: 40) says Uzana I's father Kyawswa of Pagan died in 662 ME (1300/01). Because Uzana was born after his father's death, he was born c. 1301. Yet (Zata 1960: 43) says Uzana I died in his 59th year (age 58) in 704 ME (1342/43), implying that he was born c. 1284, apparently mixing up the year of abdication with the year of death.)
Maha Yazawin	c. 1301 – ?	41 (42nd year)	1322/23 – 1342/43	20	
Yazawin Thit	c. 1300 – ?	41 (42nd year)	1319/20 – 1341/42	22	(Note: (Yazawin Thit Vol. 1 2012: 166, footnote 3): Yazawin Diga criticizes Yazawin Thit's implied birth dates for Uzana I and Kyawswa I since they make Kyawswa I about a year older than Uzana I, whom all chronicles, including Yazawin Thit, agree was older.)
Hmannan Yazawin	c. 1299 – ?	43 (44th year)	1322/23 – 1342/43	20	
Inscriptions	June 1298 – ?	42 (43rd year)	c. February 1325 – 1 September 1340	15	(Note: (Than Tun 1959: 123–124, 127): Per inscriptions, Uzana I ascended to the throne in 686 ME (1324/25), and Uzana I abdicated on 1 September 1340. Moreover, per (Than Tun 1959: 119), his father lost power on 17 December 1297. If he was born six months after his father's dethronement as reported by the main chronicles, he was born in June 1298.)
Inscriptions	June 1298 – ?	45 (to Kyawswa) (46th year)	c. February 1325 – 29 March 1344 (to Kyawswa)	19	(Note: (Than Tun 1959: 123–124, 127): Per inscriptions, Uzana I ascended to the throne in 686 ME (1324/25), and Uzana I abdicated on 1 September 1340. Moreover, per (Than Tun 1959: 119), his father lost power on 17 December 1297. If he was born six months after his father's dethronement as reported by the main chronicles, he was born in June 1298.)

== Bibliography ==
- Harvey, G. E. (1925). History of Burma: From the Earliest Times to 10 March 1824. London: Frank Cass & Co. Ltd.
- Htin Aung, Maung (1967). A History of Burma. New York and London: Cambridge University Press.
- Kala, U (2006) [1724]. Maha Yazawin (in Burmese). Vol. 1–3 (4th printing ed.). Yangon: Ya-Pyei Publishing.
- Letwe Nawrahta & Maha Sithu (1961) [c. 1770]. Hla Thamein (ed.). Alaungpaya Ayedawbon (in Burmese). Ministry of Culture, Union of Burma.
- Maha Sithu (2012) [1798]. Kyaw Win; Thein Hlaing (eds.). Yazawin Thit (in Burmese). Vol. 1–3 (2nd ed.). Yangon: Ya-Pyei Publishing.
- Phayre, Lt. Gen. Sir Arthur P. (1967) [1883]. History of Burma. London: Susil Gupta.
- Royal Historians of Burma (1960) [c. 1680]. U Hla Tin (Hla Thamein) (ed.). Zatadawbon Yazawin (in Burmese). Historical Research Directorate of the Union of Burma.
- Royal Historical Commission of Burma (2003) [1832]. Hmannan Yazawin (in Burmese). Vol. 1–3. Yangon: Ministry of Information, Myanmar.
- Sandamala Linkara, Ashin (1997–1999) [1931]. Rakhine Razawin Thit (in Burmese). Vol. 1–2. Yangon: Tetlan Sarpay.
- Sein Lwin Lay, Kahtika U (2006) [1968]. Min Taya Shwe Hti and Bayinnaung: Ketumadi Taungoo Yazawin (in Burmese) (2nd printing ed.). Yangon: Yan Aung Sarpay.
- Than Tun (December 1959). "History of Burma: A.D. 1300–1400". Journal of Burma Research Society. XLII (II).
- Tun Nyein, U; Emanuel Forchhammer; Taw Sein Ko (1899). Inscriptions of Pagan, Pinya and Ava: Translation, with Notes. Rangoon: Archaeological Survey of India.

Uzana I of Pinya Myinsaing Dynasty Born: June 1298 Died: c. 1356/57
Regnal titles
Preceded by Thihathu	King of Pinya c. February 1325 – 1 September 1340	Succeeded by Sithu of Pinya as Regent
Royal titles
Preceded by None	Heir to the Pinya Throne; 7 February 1313 – c. February 1325	Succeeded by Kyawswa I
