= 2018 in Myanmar =

- Decades: 1990s; 2000s; 2010s; 2020s
- See also: Other events of 2018; History of Myanmar; Timeline

Events in the year 2018 in Myanmar.

== Incumbents ==
- President: Htin Kyaw (until March 21), Win Myint (starting March 30)
- State Counsellor: Aung San Suu Kyi
- First Vice President: Myint Swe
- Second Vice President: Henry Van Thio

== Events ==
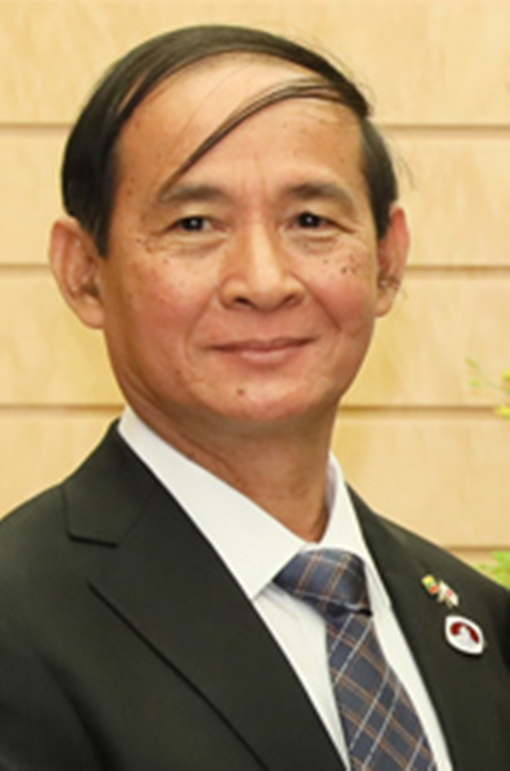
Win Myint became the 10th President of Myanmar

=== January ===
- 5 January – A military convoy was ambushed in Turaing, Rakhine State, by the Arakan Rohingya Salvation Army. Seven people were wounded.
- 16 January – Rakhine protesters rioted near a government building in the town of Mrauk U, in Rakhine State, Myanmar, after a ban was issued by local authorities on an event that commemorated the anniversary of the Kingdom of Mrauk U's dissolution. In response to protesters attempting to seize the government building, police fired live ammunition into the crowd, killing seven and wounding twelve.

=== February ===
- 21 February – a bomb exploded between two banks in Lashio, Shan State, killing two employees of Yoma Bank and injuring 22 others.
- 24 February – three bombs exploded around Sittwe, the capital of Rakhine State, injuring two people.

=== March ===
- 21 March – Htin Kyaw resigned from his position as President of Myanmar due to ill health.
- 21 March – Myint Swe became the Acting President of Myanmar.
- 30 March – Win Myint became the 10th President of Myanmar.

=== June ===
- 8 June - NCGUB was officially delisted as a terrorist group and unlawful association, along with its members by Ministry of Home Affairs.

== Deaths ==
- 2 January – Yell Htwe Aung, comedian, actor, and model (b. 1993)
- 5 April – Saw O Moo, environmental activist (b. 1975)
- 13 October – U Thuzana, Theravada Buddhist monk and leader of the DKBA (b. 1947)
