= Terrorism in Myanmar =

In Myanmar (formerly Burma), terrorism is defined by the country's counter-terrorism law and its subsections, which is interpreted by the Anti-Terrorism Central Committee and enforced by the government of Myanmar. Two groups are currently listed as terrorist organisations in accordance with Myanmar's counter-terrorism law; the Arakan Rohingya Salvation Army (ARSA), which was added on 25 August 2017, and the Arakan Army, which was added on 18 January 2019. The SPDC military government called the Vigorous Burmese Student Warriors (VBSW) "terrorists" after their role in the 1999 Myanmar Embassy siege, but the group was never legally declared as such.

== Notable incidents ==
- On 19 July 1947 at approximately 10:37 AM (MMT), several Burmese independence leaders were gunned down by a group of armed men in uniform while they were holding a cabinet meeting at the Secretariat in downtown Rangoon (present-day Yangon).
- On 9 October 1983, three North Korean agents attempted to assassinate Chun Doo-hwan, the fifth president of South Korea, by bombing the Martyrs' Mausoleum, where Doo-hwan was commemorating the sacrifice of the Burmese leaders assassinated in 1947. The blast killed 21 people and injured 46.
- On 7 October 1999, members of the Vigorous Burmese Student Warriors (VBSW) seized the Burmese embassy in Bangkok, Thailand, in an event known as the 1999 Myanmar Embassy siege. Hostages were taken by the VBSW, but all were released without harm after negotiations with Thai authorities. The attackers were later escorted back to Thailand's border with Myanmar.
- On 30 May 2003 at 8:00 PM (MMT), 70 people associated with the National League for Democracy were massacred by a government-sponsored mob in Tabayin, Sagaing Region, in an event known as the Depayin massacre.
- On 7 May 2005, simultaneous bomb blasts killed 11 people and injured 162 in Yangon. Authorities blamed Karen and Shan insurgents for the bombings.
- On 15 April 2010, three separate bombs went off in Yangon during the Thingyan Water Festival, killing 10 people and injuring 178 others in an event known as the April 2010 Yangon Thingyan bombings.
- In October 2013, a series of unexplained bombings occurred nationwide, resulting in the deaths of three people and multiple injuries.
- On 9 October 2016, hundreds of insurgents attacked three Burmese border posts along Myanmar's border with Bangladesh, killing nine Burmese border officers. The Arakan Rohingya Salvation Army (then known as "Harakah al-Yaqin") claimed responsibility for the attack, which the government labeled an act of terrorism.
- On 25 August 2017, up to 150 ARSA insurgents participated in coordinated attacks on 24 police posts and the 552nd Light Infantry Battalion army base in Rakhine State. Twelve members of Myanmar's security forces were killed in the attacks, which the government labeled an act of terrorism.
- Kha Maung Seik massacre: On 25 August 2017, Hindu villages in an area known as Kha Maung Seik in the northern Maungdaw District of Rakhine State were attacked and 99 Bengali Hindu villagers were massacred, allegedly by insurgents from the Arakan Rohingya Salvation Army. A month later, the Myanmar Army discovered mass graves containing the corpses of 45 Hindus, most of whom were women and children.

== See also ==
- Internal conflict in Myanmar
- Crime in Myanmar
