= 2020 in Myanmar =

- Decades: 2000s; 2010s; 2020s
- See also: Other events of 2020; History of Myanmar; Timeline

Events of 2020 in Myanmar.

== Incumbents ==
- President: Win Myint
- State Counsellor: Aung San Suu Kyi
- First Vice President: Myint Swe
- Second Vice President: Henry Van Thio

== Events ==
=== January ===
- 23 January – The ICJ delivers its order on provisional measures in The Gambia v. Myanmar at a public sitting in The Hague, read by Court President Abdulqawi Ahmed Yusuf.
- Activist Naw Ohn Hla and three colleagues are sentenced to one month in jail for protesting the destruction of villagers’ homes.

=== February ===
- 29 February – Myanma soldiers allegedly detain and torture a civilian in Mrauk U Township, Rakhine State, for suspected links to the Arakan Army. The man is reportedly beaten and forced to confess.

=== March ===
- 14 March – Airstrikes by the Myanmar military hit Meik Sar Wa villages in Paletwa Township, Chin State, killing multiple civilians.
- 16 March – Soldiers arrest ten villagers in Kyauktaw Township, Rakhine State, using violence against detainees.
- 23 March –
  - Myanmar confirms its first two laboratory-confirmed COVID-19 cases.
  - Myanmar officially designats the Arakan Army (AA) as an unlawful organization.
  - Nay Myo Lin, the editor of Voice of Myanmar, is charged under a counterterrorism law for interviewing an Arakan Army official.
- 30 March – Myanma soldiers burn around 10 houses and one school in Minbya Township, resulting in two civilian deaths.
- Police raid the office of Rakhine media group Narinjara News to detain three reporters, seizing multiple sets of equipment and files.

=== April ===
- 7 April – Fighting and airstrikes near Hnan Chaung Wa village in Paletwa Township, Chin State kill seven and injure eight people.

=== May ===
- 2 May – Mobile internet restrictions are lifted in Maungdaw township, Rakhine State.

=== July ===
- 2 July – At least 162 people are killed in a landslide at the Wai Khar jade mine site in the Hpakant area of Kachin State.

=== August ===
- 22 August – Rohingya politician Abdul Rasheed’s application to run for the November general election from the Sittwe constituency is rejected by Myanmar’s Union Election Commission, which claimed his parents were not citizens at the time of his birth.

=== September ===
- 22 September – The U.N. warns that Myanmar’s 2020 election will disenfranchise Rohingya voters; Myanmar defends the process, and rejects six Rohingya candidates.
- Two children are killed by artillery fire in Myebon township; as clashes in northern Shan and Kachin States cause multiple displacements.

=== October ===
- 5 October – Myanmar’s military allegedly force a group of farmers to walk ahead of troops to clear mines in Rakhine State; two boys are killed and one is wounded.

== Deaths ==
- 1 May – Tun Tin, 6th Prime Minister (b. 1920).
