= 2018 Myanmar bombings =

Two bombings targeting civilians occurred in Myanmar in 2018:

- A bombing in Lashio, Shan State, on 21 February
- Three bombings in Sittwe, Rakhine State, on 24 February
