= 2013 in Myanmar =

- Decades: 1990s; 2000s; 2010s; 2020s
- See also: Other events of 2013; History of Myanmar; Timeline

The following lists events that happened in 2013 in Myanmar.

== Incumbents ==
- President: Thein Sein
- First Vice President: Sai Mauk Kham
- Second Vice President: Nyan Tun

== Events ==
- Tensions between Buddhist and Muslim flare into violent clashes in various cities throughout central and eastern part of the country.
- A string of unexplained bombings kills three people and injured 10 more from 11 to 17 October in different parts of the country.
- The 27th Southeast Asian Games opening ceremony is held at the Wunna Theikdi Stadium, Naypyidaw.
- Arafat Mohammad flees Myanmar by boat to Malaysia after being targeted for assisting assault victims.
