= 2017 in Myanmar =

- Decades: 1990s; 2000s; 2010s; 2020s
- See also: Other events of 2017; History of Myanmar; Timeline

The following lists events in the year 2017 in Myanmar.

== Incumbents ==
- President: Htin Kyaw
- First Vice President: Myint Swe
- Second Vice President: Henry Van Thio
- State Counsellor: Aung San Suu Kyi

== Events ==
=== January ===
- 30 January - Tens of thousands of people gather for the funeral of Ko Ni, after his assassination the day before.

=== February ===
- 3 February - The United Nations Human Rights Council releases a report detailing human rights abuses against the Rohingya people by military and police forces, including rape, mass killings and possible ethnic cleansing. Aung San Suu Kyi has promised to investigate in these allegations.
- 16 February - The military of Myanmar claims to have stopped its clearance operation that the UN calls ethnic cleansing.

=== March ===
- 6 March - At least 30 people are killed in an attack by the Myanmar National Democratic Alliance Army in Laukkai, dealing a blow to Suu Kyi's goal of reaching peace with ethnic minorities.

=== April ===
- 8 April - At least 20 people are killed when a boat carrying wedding guests collides with a river barge in the west of Myanmar.

=== May ===
- 4 May - After meeting Pope Francis, Suu Kyi establishes full relations between Myanmar and the Holy See.

=== July ===
- 4 July - A mob of hundreds of Rakhine Buddhists attack seven Rohingya men from the Dapaing Camp for internally displaced persons in Sittwe, Rakhine State, killing one and severely injuring another. They were later escorted by police to Sittwe's dock to purchase boats but were attacked despite armed guards' presence.
- 31 July-Teachers from the technological and computer universities and some others medical universities launched a blue ribbon campaign to protest what they called the unfair promotion policy of the Ministry of Education.

=== August ===
- 25 August - Government officials report that 12 security personnel and 59 Rohingya insurgents were killed overnight during attacks coordinated by Rohingya insurgents on at least 26 police posts and a military base in Rakhine State.
- 27 August - Dozens of Rohingya Muslims fleeing violence in the Rakhine State are detained by Burmese and Bangladeshi officials after attempting to cross the border to Bangladesh.

=== September ===
- 5 September - In response to escalating violence by the Myanmar Army, 123,000 Rohingya fled Myanmar for Bangladesh. State Counselor Suu Kyi receives international criticism and pressure to urge her to stop the violence.
- 6 September - Bangladesh accuses the Myanmar Army of placing landmines across the border to prevent fleeing Rohingya from returning. The Burmese government denies these accusations.
- 9 September - The Arakan Rohingya Salvation Army declares a ceasefire to be in place to allow humanitarian aid to be donated to the Rohingya refugees.
- 18 September - Hundreds of pro-government protesters condemn the Rohingya insurgents and alleged outside interference with Rakhine State.
- 30 September - Thailand says it is closely watching the crisis in Rakhine State and offers aid to the governments of Myanmar and Bangladesh.

=== October ===
- 8 October - A refugee boat carrying Rohingya fleeing Myanmar for Bangladesh capsizes at the Bay of Bengal, killing 12.

=== November ===
- 16 November - Human Rights Watch releases a report detailing the systematic rape of Rohingya women and girls by security forces in Rakhine.
- 19 November - China proposes a three-stage solution for Myanmar and Bangladesh to resolve the conflict in Rakhine with both countries supporting. This includes the repatriation of refugees fleeing violence.

== Deaths ==
- 29 January – Ko Ni, lawyer, shot (b. 1953).
- 9 June – S. S. Khaplang, politician (b. 1940)
- 13 August – Aung Shwe, retired Brigadier General and one of the founders of National League for Democracy, (b. 1918).
