= 1999 attack on the Myanmar Embassy in Bangkok =

Terrorist attack on a Burmese embassy in Thailand

1999 Myanmar Embassy siege
- Part of Myanmar conflict
- Location: Myanmar Embassy, Bangkok, Thailand and Ratchaburi Hospital
- Date: 2 October 1999
- Attack type: Hostage situation, 89 hostages taken
- Weapons: AK-47 assault rifles, hand grenades, grenade launchers
- Deaths: 0
- Perpetrators: Vigorous Burmese Student Warriors; God's Army (disputed)

The 1999 Myanmar Embassy siege of 2 October 1999 was the seizure of the Burmese embassy in Bangkok, Thailand. A group of Burmese dissidents from the Vigorous Burmese Student Warriors (VBSW) and allegedly God's Army stormed the Burmese embassy and held 89 people, including embassy staff, Burmese nationals, foreigners, and Thai citizens. All hostages were released unharmed and the hostage takers escorted to the Burmese-Thai border by Thai authorities.

== Context ==
Myanmar (Burma) had been under military rule since 1962 when General Ne Win staged a coup against the democratically elected government of U Nu. He implemented the Burmese Way to Socialism system which greatly impoverished the country. In addition, the Karens had been fighting a civil war for an independent homeland since 1949. This pitted them against the majority Burman-dominated government.

In 1988, various pro-democracy demonstrations nearly succeeded in toppling the authoritarian power structure, only to be replaced by the army after a brutal crackdown. At that time, many university students from Yangon's universities fled to the Burmese-Thai border where many took up arms to restore democracy, forming the All Burma Students' Democratic Front. Democratic elections were held in 1990 where Aung San Suu Kyi's National League for Democracy (NLD) won an overwhelming majority. The junta refused to honour the results and proceeded to root out the pro-democratic forces. In 1997, led by Johnny and Luther Htoo, a group of 200 Karen Christian families left the Karen National Union and formed the God's Army (revolutionary group). Hundreds of democracy and human rights activists, including exiled students, claim refuge in Thailand and they regularly lobby for greater democracy in Myanmar.

== Attack ==
At about 11:00 local time (16:00 GMT) on Saturday, 2 October 1999, a group of five raided the Burmese embassy in Bangkok and took 89 people hostage. The group demanded that negotiations be opened between the National League for Democracy and the Burmese government, and that a parliament be convened based on the results of the 1990 election. However, they soon relaxed their demands and began to release the hostages.

At one point the gunmen threatened to start shooting their captives, one every half hour, if their demands were not met. The gunmen also mentioned they were willing to die in action. Shortly before the gunmen left the embassy a series of gunshots were heard from within the compound but there are no reports of any casualties.

The Thai government eventually allowed the hostage takers to flee by helicopter to the border with Myanmar. After being freed, correspondents say a number of the hostages expressed some sympathy with the aims of the gunmen. Some of those released unfurled pro-democracy banners near the embassy and chanted "free Burma".

The group were understood to be armed with AK-47s, hand grenades and grenade launchers.

== Aftermath and international response ==
The Burmese Government called the attack "a pure act of terrorism" and in Washington the State Department, which has been critical of the Burmese military regime, also condemned what it called "a terrorist attack".

However, correspondents say the Thai Government has been keen to avoid labelling the gunmen as terrorists and says the gunmen were just student activists asking for democracy in their homeland.

The All Burma Students Democratic Front, which represents Burmese students in exile, says it had no connection with the hostage takers and does not support violence in the pursuit of bringing democracy to Burma.

== Later developments ==
On 24 January 2000, seven God's Army and three VBSW members later hijacked a bus near the Burmese-Thai border and forced the driver to take them to Ratchaburi, where they then took over the provincial hospital. Several hundred people, including patients and hospital staff, were held captive for about 22 hours. The rebels made several demands, one being that Thai doctors and nurses be sent to treat their sick and wounded. The group claimed it had been under sustained attack by Burmese troops for a week at their mountain base near the Thai border. They also wanted Thai authorities to open the border and allow about 200 God's Army soldiers to seek refuge in Thailand. After an aborted negotiation to determine terms for surrender, Thai commandos stormed the hospital and killed all 10 hostage-takers.

== See also ==
- Vigorous Burmese Student Warriors
