= Johnny and Luther Htoo =

Juvenile twin brothers leading a Karen guerrilla faction in Myanmar

Johnny Htoo and Luther Htoo (pronounced 'too', 'H' is silent; born c. 1988) are twin brothers who jointly led the God's Army guerrilla group, a splinter group of the Karen National Union, in Myanmar (Burma) during the late 1990s.

== Formation of God's Army (1997) ==
The Htoo twins are from an area of eastern Burma populated by the Karen ethnic group. The Karen and Burmese army had fought at various times for over fifty years, but in the early 1990s the Burmese army launched a major operation to secure the route of an oil pipeline through the area. In March 1997, a local pastor brought the two illiterate nine-year-olds to the local military chief and said the Lord had spoken to them and they would save the Karen people. According to the legend among followers, the twins then rallied defenders of their village by shouting "God's Army!", leading them to a victory over Burmese troops. Various legends claimed that the brothers had numerous magical powers, including invulnerability to bullets and mines, and that they could hand out magical bullets. Supposedly, they could kill by pointing a rifle at the ground and concentrating. One tale claims that Johnny turned himself into an old man and back when bathing in a river. The legend of the boys was embraced by locals who viewed the existing Karen National Union as corrupt and ineffective. A new rebel group called God's Army of the Holy Mountain, or God's Army for short, was thus formed under the nominal leadership of the Htoo twins.

== Worldwide attention (1999–2000) ==
God's Army was situated in mountainous rainforests along the border between Burma and Thailand. They were a band of Christian guerrillas who maintained an austere lifestyle, including abstinence from sexual intercourse, alcohol, milk, eggs and pork. The boys, called "Bu Lu" and "Bu Joh" by their followers, were both chain smokers and were said to know the Bible by heart although they had never studied it.

In October 1999, a group calling themselves Vigorous Burmese Student Warriors seized the Burmese embassy in Bangkok and the situation ended with their departure, at which point they were taken in by God's Army.

The Htoos came to worldwide attention in January 2000 when 10 members of God's Army seized a hospital in Ratchaburi, Thailand. The group held 700 to 800 patients and staff members hostage for 22 hours. They demanded the Thai government stop shelling Karen positions in Burma and treatment for their wounded. Thai security forces stormed the hospital, killing all 10 of the gunmen. A photograph taken by Associated Press photographer Apichart Weerawong of a long-haired Johnny posing next to his tougher-looking, cigar-puffing brother was circulated around the world after the hospital raid. After the raid, God's Army were strenuously pursued by the Tatmadaw (Burmese armed forces) and shunned by other Karen rebels. Luther claimed at the time he had 250,000 invisible soldiers in his command while Johnny had 150,000 of his own. Their flesh-and-blood followers were estimated to be around 500 in 1998, but gradually declined to between 100 and 200 men by early 2000 after many left to find work to support their refugee families. Meanwhile, the Burmese army had 21,000 troops in the area.

== Surrender and life after God's Army (2001– ) ==
The twins surrendered to Thai soldiers in January 2001 and requested sanctuary. By that time, the number of their followers had dwindled to less than 20. They repudiated the stories about being invulnerable but insisted that God had helped them to survive over the years. They were reunited with their family. In July 2006, Johnny Htoo surrendered to Burma's military government with eight other members of God's Army in two groups.

In 2009, Luther Htoo sought status as a refugee in Sweden and settled in Götene while Johnny Htoo moved to a Thai refugee camp while attempting to go to New Zealand to join his mother and sister. Luther married another Karen refugee in Sweden and fathered three children (boys) with her before divorcing. In 2018, Luther Htoo returned to Myanmar after meeting a woman online; as of 2020 both are reportedly unemployed and struggle with alcoholism.
