= God's Army (revolutionary group) =

Christian terrorist organisation

- ဘုရားသခင်၏ တပ်မတော်
- Leader: Johnny and Luther Htoo
- Dates active: 1997–2006
- Active regions: Kayin State; Myanmar–Thailand border
- Ideology: Karen interests Christian extremism
- Size: 500 (peak)
- Wars: the Internal conflict in Myanmar

God's Army (Burmese: ဘုရားသခင်၏ တပ်မတော်) was a Christian armed revolutionary group that opposed the then-ruling military junta of Myanmar (Burma). The group was an offshoot of the Karen National Union. They were based along the Thailand-Burma border, and conducted a string of audacious guerrilla actions including allegedly being involved in the seizure of the Myanmar embassy in Bangkok in 1999. They have been described as a terrorist organisation.

== Formation ==
God's Army was formed in an area of eastern Burma populated by the Karen ethnic group, who had been fighting against Burmese army at various times for over fifty years, primarily through the Karen National Union. In the early 90s the Burmese army launched a major operation to secure the route of an oil pipeline through the area. God's Army was led by brothers Johnny and Luther Htoo beginning in 1997, who were at that time estimated to be only ten years of age. Some of the followers of the twins believed that they had "Animist and Christian powers". According to the legend among followers, the twins were the only two who defended their village from the Burmese authorities who had constantly persecuted their people for their Christian beliefs and for a desire for ethnic autonomy. The Burmese authorities had destroyed villages, killed Karen fighters, raped dozens of women and caused thousands to flee. The members believed the brothers shouted "God's Army!", leading them to a victory over Burmese troops. The legend of the boys was embraced by locals who viewed the existing Karen National Union as corrupt and ineffective. Some of its members also called themselves as ''Jesus Warriors'' or ''Jesus Commandos''. According to Kwe Htoo, the name of the group was Kaserdoh God's Army.

== Activity ==
God's Army was situated in mountainous rainforests along the border between Burma and Thailand. They were a band of Christian guerrillas who maintained an austere lifestyle, including abstinence from sexual intercourse, alcohol, milk, eggs, and pork. The group was estimated to have around 500 fighters in 1998, but gradually declined to anywhere between 100 and 200 men in early 2000. Many left to find work to support their refugee families while others are thought to have left for personal reasons. Meanwhile, the Burmese army had 21,000 troops in the area. In October 1999, a group calling themselves Vigorous Burmese Student Warriors along with the God's Army seized the Burmese embassy in Bangkok and the situation ended with their departure, at which point they were taken in by God's Army. The Burmese Government called the attack "a pure act of terrorism" and in Washington the State Department, which has been critical of the Burmese military regime, also condemned what it called "a terrorist attack".

In January 2000, 10 members of God's Army seized a hospital in Ratchaburi, Thailand. The group held about 500 patients and staff members hostage for 22 hours. They demanded the Thai government stop shelling Karen positions in Burma and treatment for their wounded. They planted "booby" traps in the hospital and threatened to blow up the hospital. Thai security forces stormed the hospital, killing all 10 of the gunmen. After the raid, God's Army were strenuously pursued by the Tatmadaw (Burmese armed forces) and shunned by other Karen rebels.

== Surrender and disbandment ==
In January 2001, the Htoo twins and the less than 20 remaining members of God's Army surrendered to Thai soldiers and requested sanctuary. They abandoned the Karens' goal of an autonomous or independent homeland, in exchange for permission to stay in Thailand.

In July 2006, Johnny Htoo surrendered to Burma's military government with eight other members of God's Army in two groups.

== See also ==
- Karen National Union
