= 2015 in Myanmar =

- Decades: 1990s; 2000s; 2010s; 2020s
- See also: Other events of 2015; History of Myanmar; Timeline

The following lists events that happened during 2015 in the Republic of the Union of Myanmar.

== Incumbents ==
- President: Thein Sein
- First Vice President: Sai Mauk Kham
- Second Vice President: Nyan Tun

== Events ==
=== January ===
- January - An estimated 1,000 people are reported to have been displaced due to the clashes.

=== February ===
- February 13 - 2015 Kokang offensive
  - In the northeast, 47 soldiers were killed in fighting against Kokang rebels.
- February 14 - 2015 Kokang offensive
  - The Burmese government launches airstrikes against the Kokang rebels.
- February 15 - 2015 Kokang offensive
  - Around a dozen Kokang rebels by the Myanmar Army and another eight are captured.

=== March ===
- March 3 - Myanmar students on a march to Yangon to protest an academic bill defy a police order to disperse in Letpadan Township.
- March 13 -
  - China sends fighter jets to the border of Myanmar after an attempted bombing of rebels on Chinese land kills 4 people.
  - A ferry sinks off the Burmese coast, leaving 21 dead and 26 missing.

=== April ===
- April 19 - 2015 Kokang offensive
  - Burmese authorities claim that 126 Burmese soldiers died in clashes with the Myanmar Nationalities Democratic Alliance Army in Kokang since February.

=== May ===
- May - 2015 Rohingya refugee crisis
  - 469 Rohingya from Myanmar on two boats reach western Indonesia have been turned away by the Indonesian Navy. Rohingya and Bangladeshi refugees also arrive in Malaysia but are detained. The Myanmar Navy rescues two boats with 208 migrants during international pressure to make the Rohingya citizens of Burma to end the refugee crisis.
- May 23 - President Thein Sein signs the Population Control Health Care Bill requiring parents to space each child apart by three years.

=== July ===
- July 16: 2015 Myanmar floods

=== August ===
- August 10: Black Ribbon Movement Myanmar
  - A movement of medical professions and medical students against the appointment of military officers to positions within Ministry of Health.

=== November ===
- November 8: 2015 Myanmar general election
- November 22: 2015 Hpakant jade mine disaster
  - A major landslide in Hpakant, Kachin State, northern Myanmar killed at least 116 people near a jade mine, with around 100 more missing.
