= 2021 in Myanmar =

- Decades: 2000s; 2010s; 2020s
- See also: Other events of 2021; History of Myanmar; Timeline

2021 (MMXXI) was a common year starting on Friday of the Gregorian calendar, the 2021st year of the Common Era (CE) and Anno Domini (AD) designations, the 21st year of the 3rd millennium and the 21st century, and the 2nd year of the 2020s decade.

Year 2021 is a major year in Myanmar, particularly after the February 1 coup d'état. As hundreds of thousands of Myanmar citizens held major protests across Myanmar, the military junta cracked down on protesters. These crackdowns later turned violent and caused the deaths of more than 700 people across Myanmar. The aftermath of the coup caused a severe deterioration on the security and condition of the country, with United Nations describing it as "near civil war-like".

== Incumbents ==
=== Prior to coup d'état ===
Photo	Post	Name
	President of Myanmar	Win Myint
	State Counsellor of Myanmar	Aung San Suu Kyi
	First Vice President	Myint Swe
	Second Vice President	Henry Van Thio

=== After coup d'etat ===
Photo	Post	Name
	Acting President; First Vice President	Myint Swe
	Chairman of the State Administration Council; Prime Minister	Min Aung Hlaing
	Vice Chairman of the State Administration Council; Deputy Prime Minister	Soe Win
	Second Vice President	Henry Van Thio

== Events ==
=== January to February ===
- 30 January – Hundreds of military supporters rallied in Yangon after claiming frauds on the outcome of the 2020 Burmese general election.
- 1 February
  - Myanmar General Min Aung Hlaing deposed elected leader of civilian government Aung San Suu Kyi from her position and decided to arrest members of civilian government after claiming multiple frauds on the 2020 Burmese general election.
  - Following the coup, military junta announced a one year period of national emergency.
- 2 February – Small protests sporadically appear across the country following the coup d'état on the previous day.
- 5 February – Members of the deposed Burmese parliament formed a new committee to represent as "the legitimate government of the Burmese people".
- 6 February – Thousands of people poured onto the street in Yangon and multiple cities across Myanmar to denounce the coup d'état on 1st of February, marking the first large-scale protest since the coup.
- 8 February – Martial law declared by military following major protests across Myanmar.
- 10 February – Myanmar military junta began to crack down on protesters.
- 15 February – Military authorities imposed a daily internet outage from 01:00 am to 09.00 am local time.
- 19 February – 20-year old Mya Thwe Thwe Khine died after being shot by Myanmar security forces, the first death since the coup.
- 22 February - Thousands of people in several cities and towns around the country took to the street to protests against the military coup. On the day people couldn't access the internet until 12:00PM in the afternoon. The date would later be known as 22222 uprising.
- 28 February – At least 18 protesters were killed after Myanmar police opened fire on crowds.

=== March to April ===
- 3 March – At least 38 protesters were shot dead by security forces following violent crackdown across Myanmar.
- 9 March – Myanmar military shut down independent medias in its latest attempt of cracking down dissents.
- 14 March – International condemnations after multiple businesses were set on fire and scores of protesters were shot dead across Myanmar in one of the deadliest day since the coup.
- 17 March – CRPH removed every armed ethnic groups, except the military junta, from its terrorist groups designation.
- 25 March - The Kachin Independence Army captures the Tatamadaw's Alaw Bum hill airbase during the Battle of Alaw Bum in Kachin state.
- 27 March – Massacre of hundreds of Burmese protesters during the annual Myanmar Armed Forces Day drew international condemnations and new economic sanctions on members of the military junta.
- 2 April – CRPH abolished the 2008 Myanmar Constitution and created the Federal Democracy Charter as a legal basis for a Democratic Union in Myanmar.
- 10 April – Over 80 protesters were killed in the Burmese city of Bago after Myanmar military shot rifle grenades onto crowds.
- 16 April – CRPH announced the formation of National Unity Government (NUG).
- 24 April – ASEAN held talks with Burmese military junta and UN envoy in Jakarta to discuss over the deteriorating condition in Myanmar. Multiple agreements were later announced.
- 26 April – Heavy fighting erupted after members of Karen National Union stormed a military outpost near Myanmar - Thai border.

=== May to June ===
- 3 May – Kachin Independence Army shot down a military helicopter in Kachin State, killing all aboard.
- 4 May – Japanese journalist Yuki Kitazumi was charged by the military junta for spreading false news, the first foreign journalist to be charged by the military junta since the coup.
- 5 May
  - Myanmar military junta bans satellite dish.
  - National Unity Government of Myanmar announced the establishment of People's Defense Force.
- 6 May – More than 200 rights groups called on the United Nations Security Council to impose arms embargo on Myanmar.
- 8 May
  - The Arakan National Council announced that its Kayin State-based Arakan Army would join the Karen National Liberation Army in its fight against the Burmese military junta.
  - Ruling military junta rejected ASEAN plans to visit the country, citing the nation's troubling stability as the reason.
  - State-media announced that National Unity Government of Myanmar would be designated as a terrorist group, blaming the group for the recent turmoil in the country.
- 14 May - Martial law declared in Mindat, Chin State as rebels step up attack against Myanmar military troops.
- 16 May - Myanmar military recaptured Mindat after local militias retreated from the town.
- 21 May - Burmese electoral commission dissolves National League for Democracy (NLD) Party for "alleged voting fraud" in the 2020 election.
- 27 May - Energy giants Total and Chevron announced suspension of payments for the Burmese military junta due to killings of protesters.
- 29 May - Ministry of Health and Sports imposes social restrictions after rise in COVID-19 cases.
- 10 June
  - Burmese authorities charged Aung San Suu Kyi for alleged corruption.
  - A military plane carrying at least 14 passengers and crew members crashed in Mandalay, killing 12 people including one the nation's most influential monks, Abhisheka Maha Rattha Guru Bhatanda Kavisara.
- 22 June - Clashes between local People Defense Force and the Tatmadaw erupt in Mandalay.
- 28 June - Rebels reportedly killed 30 Burmese military officers in Falam and Hakha, Chin State.

=== July to August ===
- 2 July - At least 30 people, including rebels, were killed and 10,000 people were displaced after Burmese military junta raided a village in Depayin Township, Sagaing Region.
- 4 July - Clashes broke out between local People's Defence Forces and Burmese military junta in Kawlin Township, Sagaing, killing at least 22.
- 10 July - Heavy clashes between Kachin Independence Army and Burmese military junta were reported in Hpakant Township, Kachin State.
- 13 July - Local villagers discovered 15 bodies with signs of torture in Kani Township, Sagaing.
- 23 July - Myanmar military launches surprise attack on rebels in Mindat Township, Chin State. More than 20,000 people have been displaced by the fighting.
- 26 July - More than 800 villagers were forced to flee from their homes after military junta raided a village and burned houses in Falam Township, Chin State.
- 28 July - Massive flood swept through Southeast Myanmar, forcing hundreds to evacuate.
- 3 August - COVID-19 death toll in Myanmar surpass 310,000 as cases skyrocket.
- 7 August - Myanmar military junta officially asked for assistance from neighboring countries after spike in COVID-19 cases caused healthcare crisis in the country.
- 8 August - Burmese military leader Min Aung Hlaing announced plans for holding an election by 2023.
- 12 - 13 August - Floods and landslides batter the city of Mogok, killing four people.
- 25 August - Resistance fighters ambushed junta soldiers in Magwe, killing 30 people.

=== September to October ===
- 7 September
  - Acting President of National Unity Government Duwa Lashi La announced a "declaration of war" on Myanmar military junta and urged Burmese citizens to revolt.
  - Resistance forces clash with military troops in multiple areas in Tanintharyi.

=== November to December ===
- 5 December – a military truck rams into a group of protestors, injuring several people.
- 22 December - 2021 Hpakant jade mine disaster
