= 2007 in Myanmar =

- Decades: 1980s; 1990s; 2000s; 2010s; 2020s
- See also: Other events of 2007; History of Myanmar; Timeline

Events from the year 2007 in Myanmar:

== Incumbents ==
- Chairman of the State and Peace Development Council: Than Shwe
- Prime Minister: Soe Win (until October 12), Thein Sein (starting October 12)

== Events ==
=== January ===
- January 10 – The United States has presents a draft resolution to the United Nations Security Council, calling on Myanmar to ease repression and free opposition leader Aung San Suu Kyi.
- January 11 – Five prominent dissidents jailed last September are released from jail. Forty political detainees were also released last week, as part of a mass release to mark the 59th anniversary of Myanmar's independence from Britain.

=== August ===
- August 22: The U.S. Campaign for Burma claims that Myanmar's military government has arrested at least nine leaders of the pro-democracy 88 Generation Students.

=== September ===
- September 22: Several hundred Buddhist monks marched through Burma's second largest city Mandalay as activists urged people to join the protests against the ruling military junta.
- September 29: Shortly after his scheduled arrival at Yangon, it was reported that Ibrahim Gambari, the UN Secretary-General's special adviser on Burma, had arrived in Naypyidaw to talk with the junta leaders.

=== October ===
- October 8: 2007 Burmese anti-government protests: Burma's junta announces that Buddhist monasteries have accepted US$8000 as well as food and medicine from its soldiers to signify the armed forces have not left the faith.
- October 14: Burma restores some Internet access but continues to deny access to foreign news services such as the BBC and CNN, blogs and dissident sites.
- October 31: Buddhist monks return to the streets of Burma for the first time since a crackdown on protests last month.

=== November ===
- November 15: United Nations human rights envoy Paulo Sergio Pinheiro visits political prisoners, including Su Su Nway, in Burma's Insein Prison.
- November 18: 2007 Burmese anti-government protests: ASEAN Secretary General Ong Keng Yong says Burma will not be suspended from the organization.
- November 19: The European Union imposes tougher sanctions on Burma, including an embargo on gemstones, metal and timber, and a tighter visa ban against members of the State Peace and Development Council.

== Deaths ==
- October 12: Soe Win, 59, Prime Minister (2004–2007), leukemia.
- October 26: Khun Sa, 73, warlord.
