= 2022 in Myanmar =

- Decades: 2000s; 2010s; 2020s
- See also: Other events of 2022; History of Myanmar; Timeline

Events in the year 2022 in Myanmar.

== Incumbents ==
Photo	Post	Name
	Acting President; First Vice President	Myint Swe
	Chairman of the State Administration Council; Prime Minister	Min Aung Hlaing
	Vice Chairman of the State Administration Council; Deputy Prime Minister	Soe Win
	Second Vice President	Henry Van Thio

== Events ==
Ongoing - Myanmar civil war (2021–present)

=== January ===
- 7 January - Intense fighting breaks out in Loikaw, the Kayah State Capital between KNDF and junta troops as resistance groups attempt to take the city after one month of blocking junta road access to the entire state.
- 10 January- Myanmar military begins bombing Loikaw from the air forcing thousands of locals to flee the city and seek shelter in churches. Junta helicopters regain control of roads to other parts of Kayah State.
- 13 January- Maung Maung Kyaw is removed as the head of the Myanmar Air Force after international attention and sanctions from a series of aerial bombings. He remains on the junta.
- 28 January - Myanmar civil war: At least three dozen junta soldiers are reported killed in ambushes over three days in Magwe, Sagaing and Tanintharyi regions and Chin, Shan and Kayah states.

=== February ===
- 4 February - Junta troops carries out a sneak attack on an Arakan Army outpost near Maungdaw in Rakhine State
- 6 February - A three hour clash between Arakan Army and the Junta starts a breakdown of the informal ceasefire between the AA and the military in place since November 2020.
- 8 February - 85 junta soldiers are reportedly killed in attacks over the course of three days by local PDFs in the Sagaing and Bago regions the previous day as PDF groups target Pilots in the Myanmar Air Force. Resistance forces also began targeting the homes of junta pilots in Yangon in response to airstrikes on civilians.

=== March ===
- 2 March – The Myanmar military junta pardons several celebrities who spoke out against the military coup including Lu Min, Wyne, Pyay Ti Oo, Eaindra Kyaw Zin and Paing Takhon.
- 5 March - Around 85 junta soldiers are reportedly killed during two clashes with local PDFs and Karenni forces in Demoso Township, Kayah State with at least two junta soldiers captured.
- 21 March
  - The United States formally recognizes the Rohingya genocide committed by the Myanmar Army.
  - Karen National Liberation Army (KNLA) storms and occupies a Tatmadaw camp in Myawaddy District, Kayin State three miles from the Burmese-Thai border.
- 28 March - Min Aung Hlaing vows to "annihilate" opposition forces.

=== April ===
- 14 April - Fighting breaks out Loikaw City, the capital of Kayah State.
- 15 April – Karen conflict: An attempt by the Burmese army to take control of Lay Kay Kaw, a Karen National Union-controlled town, fails resulting in 30 casualties for the Junta.
- 17 April – Myanmar's military junta pardons 1,619 prisoners in an annual tradition. However, no political prisoners were pardoned.
- 24 April – It is reported that family members of the ruling military junta in the city of Yangon are seeking refuge in the country's capital Naypyidaw as urban fighting intensifies between soldiers and insurgents.
- 27 April - Chinland Defense Force fighters from Matupi Township ambush a 70 vehicle Tatmadaw column between Matupi and Kyauktaw, resulting in the deaths of 8 junta soldiers.

=== May ===
- 17 May - National Unity Government Defence Minister asks international help to arm resistance groups similar to support given to Ukraine.
- 24 May – Sixteen people are killed when a boat sinks off the coast of Myanmar.
- 31 May
  - A bombing kills one person and injures nine others near the Sule Pagoda in Yangon. State media accuses the People's Defence Force of responsibility, which the PDF denies.
  - Amnesty International accuses Myanmar's military of Collective punishment based on civilian bombings in Shan State and Kayah State in the between December 2021 and March 2022.

=== June ===
- 21 June - Resistance groups reach control of 40-50% of the country.
- 22 June – The military junta of Myanmar orders all legal proceedings against deposed leader Aung San Suu Kyi to be moved from courtrooms to prison venues without explanation. Aung San Suu Kyi has been under detainment since the February 2021 coup.
- 23 June - Ousted State Counsellor Aung San Suu Kyi is sent to solitary confinement.

=== July ===
- 22 July – Rohingya genocide case: The International Court of Justice rejects the Myanmar military junta's challenge of the case against the country for its role in the Rohingya genocide.
- 25 July – Myanmar announces that it has executed four prisoners on charges of terrorism, including Zayar Thaw, a former lawmaker under ousted leader Aung San Suu Kyi, and Kyaw Min Yu.

=== August ===
- 1 August - Min Aung Hlaing extends state of emergency until August 2023 invoking the extension clause in the order given on 1 August 2021.
- 15 August – 2021 Myanmar coup d'état: The military junta court sentences former state counsellor Aung San Suu Kyi to six years in prison for corruption.
- 16 August - Two mortar shells fired from Myanmar Army landed in a Rohingya refugee camp in Bangladesh, killing one man and injuring five others. Myanmar Army helicopters allegedly entered Bangladeshi air space to attack Arakan Army and reportedly fired a shell within Bangladeshi air space.
- 18 August - Bangladesh summons Myanmar ambassador Aung Kyaw Moe to protest violation of land and airspace strongly.

=== September ===
- 2 September – Deposed leader of Myanmar Aung San Suu Kyi is sentenced to three years in prison after being found guilty of election fraud. She will now serve an overall sentence of 20 years in prison for different charges.
- 14 September – Fourteen people are killed and 25 others are injured in a three vehicle collision in Kyaukpadaung.
- 16 September – Myanmar Army helicopters attack a school in Sagaing Region, killing six children and injuring 17 people. Military officials say that the school was being used as a base by anti-coup insurgents.
- 23 September - Retired Brigadier General Ohn Thwin, mentor to State Administration Council vice-chairman Senior General Soe Win, was assassinated by anti-regime guerilla groups in Yangon.

=== October ===
- 6 October - Japanese filmmaker Toru Kubota is sentenced to 10 years in jail on sedition charges after being detained in July for documenting anti-government demonstrations and reporting on the Rohingya minority previously.
- 21 October
  - Junta forces decapitate Saw Tun Moe, a high school teacher, and leave his head impaled on the NUG-administered school's spiked gate after burning and looting Taung Myint village in Magway Region
  - KNLA-led troops siege Kawkareik. A series of morning attacks near the highway leading into the city and on government offices leads to heavy fighting within the city.
- 22 October- Myanmar is added to the Financial Action Task Force Graylist for terrorism financing and requires other countries to increase measures to screen transactions with Myanmar
- 23 October - Hpakant massacre: Two fighter jets from the Myanmar Air Force air-strikes a concert in Hpakant killing 80 civilians, including prominent local singers. Kachin Independence Army spokespeople say it was a targeted strike against the 62nd anniversary celebration of the founding of the Kachin Independence Organization. The United Nations issues a statement expressing their sadness.
- 25 October - Garment factory workers of Myanmar Pou Chen Co Ltd, a Taiwanese company making OEM shoes for Adidas strike demanding a pay raise. Junta soldiers appeared within 10 minutes of the rally bringing seven strike leaders to factory managers. The leaders were later fired for their role in December.
- 31 October - Win Myint Hlaing, a former NLD MP for Magway Region, is sentenced to 148 years in prison on charges of terror acts undermining the peace and stability of the State.

=== November ===
- 9 November - The US and EU announce additional sanctions at officials, companies and arm dealers connected with Myanmar's junta.
- 11 November - ASEAN bars Myanmar from talks as the first day of the ASEAN summit focuses on how to pressure the junta to comply with previously agreed five-point consensus. Indonesia plans to extend the ban on Myanmar's representation, but received pushback from Thailand arguing that it would become a de facto suspension of membership.
- 15 November - The junta shells villages in Rakhine State on the highway between Yangon and Sittwe after a junta truck was hit by an Arakan Army landmine. Thousands of villagers flee to nearby Ponnagyun Township or Sittwe.
- 17 November - Nearly 6000 prisoners are freed in a mass amnesty by the military junta. Free prisoners include a former British envoy Vicky Bowman, Australian economic advisor Sean Turnell and Japanese reporter Toru Kubota. Human Rights groups say the junta is engaging in hostage tactics to negotiate with foreign powers. Japan maintained that they will continue to demand Myanmar take specific actions for the reinstatement of democracy. Myanmar junta denies that it engaged in political bargaining before releasing prisoners.
- 24 November - The junta burns Mone-Hla village in Khin-U Township, Sagaing Region including the home of Cardinal Charles Maung Bo, the head of the Catholic Church in Myanmar.
- 25 November - Authorities bulldoze over 10,000 Informal housing units in Mingaladon Township, Yangon after ordering residents to evacuate leaving over 40,000 homeless.
- 30 November - Prominent traditional arts performer Phoe Chit is taken into custody for his role in opposing the military rule.

=== December ===
- 15 December - The United Nations General Assembly credentials committee once again defers action on the State Administration Council's request to represent the country at the UN, defaulting to the NUG representative Kyaw Moe Tun.
- 16 December - The BURMA Act is passed in the US authorising sanctions on individuals involved in the 2021 Myanmar coup d'état, support to civil society and humanitarian assistance as well as a position within the State Department dedicated to democracy in Burma.
- 30 December - Aung San Suu Kyi is sentenced to 33 years in prison for corruption.

== Deaths ==
- 7 February – Abhijatabhivamsa, Buddhist monk (born 1968)
- 16 February – Pheung Kya-shin, guerrilla leader and drug smuggler, chairman of Kokang Special Region (1989–1993, 1995–2009) (born 1931)
- 19 February – Kyi Hla Han, golfer (born 1961)
- 20 March – Vijjota, Buddhist monk, thathanabaing (since 2017) (born 1930)
- 18 April – Thein Tun, beverage executive and banker, founder of Tun Foundation Bank (born 1937)
- 30 April – Khun Htun Oo, political activist (born 1943)
- 23 May – Zaw Htay, politician, spokesman of the President Office (2011–2016) (born 1973)
- 23 July –
  - Kyaw Min Yu, writer and political activist (born 1969)
  - Zayar Thaw, politician and rapper, MP (2012–2016, 2016–2021) (born 1981)
- 12 August – Lillian Frank, hairdresser, philanthropist, and fashion influencer (born 1930)
- 13 August – Maung Paw Tun, writer (born 1935)
