= 2014 in Myanmar =

- Decades: 1990s; 2000s; 2010s; 2020s
- See also: Other events of 2014; History of Myanmar; Timeline

The following lists events that happened in 2014 in the Republic of the Union of Myanmar.

== Incumbents ==
- President: Thein Sein
- First Vice President: Sai Mauk Kham
- Second Vice President: Nyan Tun

== Events ==
=== January ===
- January 14- Myanmar host the 2014 ASEAN Para Games for first time.
- January 14 - A Thailand-based women's rights group accuses Myanmar of using rape as a weapon of war.

=== March ===
- March 28 - Buddhist mobs in western Myanmar reportedly target foreign aid groups and workers in reaction to supposedly disrespectful treatment of a Buddhist flag.

=== September ===
- September 28 - A Buddhist monk accused of inciting violence against Muslims in Burma says he is joining forces with the Bodu Bala Sena group in Sri Lanka in order to combat a "serious threat from jihadist groups".
