= 2019 in Myanmar =

- Decades: 1990s; 2000s; 2010s; 2020s
- See also: Other events of 2019; History of Myanmar; Timeline

Events of 2019 in Myanmar xxx

== Incumbents ==
- President: Win Myint
- State Counsellor: Aung San Suu Kyi
- First Vice President: Myint Swe
- Second Vice President: Henry Van Thio

== Events ==
- 22 April: April 2019 Hpakant jade mine collapse
- 22 August: A United Nations report charges that sexual violence carried out by security forces against the Muslim Rohingya minority is widespread and severe, and it demonstrates intent to commit genocide and warrants prosecution for war crimes.

== Deaths ==
- 12 January – Taw Phaya, pretender to the throne (b. 1924)
