= 2012 in Myanmar =

- Decades: 1990s; 2000s; 2010s; 2020s
- See also: Other events of 2012; History of Myanmar; Timeline

The following lists events that happened during 2012 in Myanmar.

== Incumbents ==
- President - Thein Sein
- Vice President - Tin Aung Myint Oo, Sai Mauk Kham
- Minister of the President's Office - Soe Thein, Aung Min, Tin Naing Thein
- Minister for Information - Aung Kyi
- Minister for Energy - Than Htay
- Minister for National Planning and Economic Development - Tin Naing Thein
- Minister for Construction - Khin Maung Myint
- Minister for Finance and Revenue - Hla Tun
- Minister for Commerce - Win Myint
- Minister for Foreign Affairs - Wunna Maung Lwin
- Minister for Home Affairs - Ko Ko
- Minister for Defence - Hla Min

== Events ==
- The Myanma military begins its systematic violence against the Rohingya people, burning villages and committing atrocities.
