= 2016 in Myanmar =

- Decades: 1990s; 2000s; 2010s; 2020s
- See also: Other events of 2016; History of Myanmar; Timeline

The following lists events that happened in 2016 in the Republic of the Union of Myanmar.

== Incumbents ==
- President: Thein Sein (until March 30), Htin Kyaw (starting March 30)
- First Vice President: Sai Mauk Kham (until March 30), Myint Swe (starting March 30)
- Second Vice President: Nyan Tun (until March 30), Henry Van Thio (starting March 30)
- State Counsellor: Aung San Suu Kyi (starting April 6)

== Events ==
=== February ===
- February 1 - The second session of House of Representatives, the lower house of the parliament convenes.
- February 3 - The second session of House of Nationalities, the upper house of the parliament convenes.
- February 8 - The second session of Assembly of the Union (Union Parliament) convenes
- February 8 - The second session of State and Regional Hluttaws convene.

=== March ===
- March 30 - Htin Kyaw became the President of Myanmar.

=== April ===
- April 6 - Aung San Suu Kyi assumed the newly created role of the State Counsellor, a position similar to Prime Minister.
- April 13 - A magnitude 6.9 earthquake struck 135 km (84 mi) north-west of Mandalay.

=== August ===
- August 24 - A magnitude 6.8 earthquake struck 25 km (16 mi) west of Chauk. Several temples in the nearby ancient city of Bagan were damaged and four people were reported dead.

== Predicted and scheduled events ==
=== November ===
- November 19 - Myanmar along with the Philippines begins hosting the group stages of the 2016 AFF Championship.
