= 2023 in Myanmar =

- Decades: 2000s; 2010s; 2020s
- See also: Other events of 2023; History of Myanmar; Timeline

This is the list of important events happened in Myanmar in 2023.

== Incumbents ==
Photo	Post	Name
	Acting President; First Vice President	Myint Swe
	Chairman of the State Administration Council; Prime Minister	Min Aung Hlaing
	Vice Chairman of the State Administration Council; Deputy Prime Minister	Soe Win
	Second Vice President	Henry Van Thio
	Deputy Prime Minister	Mya Tun Oo
100	Deputy Prime Minister	Soe Htut
	Deputy Prime Minister	Tin Aung San
	Deputy Prime Minister	Win Shein

== Events ==
=== January ===
- 7 January - One person is killed and 60 others are injured in a prison riot in Pathein.

=== February ===
- 1 February - On the second anniversary of the 2021 military coup d'état, the military extends the country's state of emergency for another six months, postponing the general election initially scheduled for August 1. The opposition marks the occasion with a silent strike.

=== March ===
- 29 March - Myanmar's ruling military junta dissolves the National League for Democracy, the political party of former State Counsellor Aung San Suu Kyi.
- 30 March - Eight people are killed by a bombing in a village in Chin State.

=== April ===
- 11 April - At least 100 people are killed in an airstrike by the Burmese junta in the village of Pazigyi (Kanbalu Township) in Sagaing region, in the third major civilian attack since the junta's offensive in Sagaing began in February. It is the junta's deadliest attack since seizing power in 2021.
- 13 April - Four people are killed and 12 others are injured when a series of car bombs explode during a Thingyan festival in Lashio, Shan State.

=== May ===
- 5 May -
  - Myanmar's military junta commutes 38 death sentences to life imprisonment as part of a wider amnesty.
  - Shanghai Cooperation Organisation (SCO) granted Myanmar as a dialogue partner status. Myanmar ambassador of India U Moe Kyaw Maung signed the MoU.
- 6 May - The Motion Picture Award Presentation Ceremony, popularly known as Academy ceremony, was held for the first time in four years. Awards were presented for the films shown in theatre in 2019, 2020 and 2022. Vice-Senior General Soe Win attended the ceremony.
- 14 May - Cyclone Mocha hit the coastline of Rakhine State in Western Myanmar. Up to 90 percent of Sittwe, the state's capital, had been damaged and electricity infrastructure, mobile phone masts and several houses were destroyed. Before the storm made landfall 4,000 out of 300,000 Sittwe residents were evacuated to other cities. The military declare the whole of Rakhine a disaster area.
- 25 May - Bhamo Sayadaw, one of the most revered monks in Myanmar, died at the age of 94. His funeral was held on 6 June in Mandalay. Thousands of followers lined the route of the funeral procession. General Min Aung Hlaing acted as one of the pallbearers.

=== June ===
- 7 June - Three people are killed by a 4.8 magnitude earthquake in Ayeyarwady Region.
- 19 June - People across the country participated in the flower strike to mark Aung San Suu Kyi's Birthday. A day later, more than 100 people were arrested for wearing flowers.

=== July ===
- 12 July - Thai deputy prime minister and foreign minister Don Pramudwinai announces that he visited jailed Myanmar democracy leader Aung San Suu Kyi last week, becoming the first known foreign representative to meet with the deposed state counsellor since the 2021 coup d'état.
- 31 July - Acting President Myint Swe announces the National Defence and Security Council's extension of the country's state of emergency by six months, likely delaying the general election that was previously pledged to be held by August, saying that the country's situation has "not returned to normalcy yet".

=== August ===
- 2 and 3 August - A major cabinet reshuffle occurred among the junta appointed officials. Lieutenant General Yar Pyae and General Mya Tun Oo were appointed as ministers of Interior and Transportation respectively. Ministry of International Cooperation was abolished and Dr. Thet Thet Khaing became minister of Hotel and Tourism. Several high level officials were also dismissed due to charges of corruption.
- 8 August - 14 people including a Swiss national were arrested for making a film, the content of which, according to the military, is harmful to Buddhist and Burmese cultural norms. The film is called "Don't Expect Anything" and it was released on TikTok and YouTube on 24 July. The arrest was condemned by the monks who were opposed to the junta's action.
- 11 August - Five people are killed and approximately 40,000 are evacuated due to floods and landslides from monsoon rains in Myanmar.
- 14 August - 2023 Hpakant jade mine disaster - At least 34 miners are missing after a landslide at a jade mine in Hpakant.
- 24 August - Hip-hop artist Byu Har is sentenced to 20 years in prison for criticizing the military-controlled government's inability to provide electricity to Yangon- a harsher sentence than other celebrities found guilty of criticism.
- 25 August - The State Administration Council expels the ambassador from East Timor in retaliation for the East Timorese government meeting with the National Unity Government.

=== September ===
- 3 September - Cobra Column, a resistance group active in Southern Myanmar, made two attacks on the township administrative office in Myawaddy using drones. Five people, including a policeman and a high ranking military official, were killed and 11 were severely wounded.
- 23 September - An earthquake of 4.8 magnitude lasting for one minute was felt in Yangon around 20:55 MMT.

=== October ===
- 8 October - Flood in Bago forced more than 10,007 people to evacuate to 34 refugee camps established by the military government.
- 10 October - According to local media, an attack at a refugee camp of the Kachin Independence Army in Laiza killed 30 people including 13 children and injured 60 others.
- 15 October - The SAC celebrated the 8th anniversary of signing Nationwide Ceasefire Agreement at Nay Pyi Taw. The ceremony is attended by seven signatories, out of 10 signatories, including the Karen National Liberation Army/Peace Council, Pa-O National Liberation Council, Arakan Liberation Party, Restoration Council of Shan State, Democratic Karen Benevolent Army, New Mon State Party, and Lahu Democratic Union. Three of the NCA signatories, All Burma Students' Democratic Front, Chin National Front and Karen National Union boycotted the anniversary.
- 21 October - The Tatmadaw conducts airstrikes and deploys additional troops in response to the Kachin Independence Army's attacks near the China–Myanmar border in Mu Se District and Laiza, Kachin State.
- 27 October - Three ethnic armed organizations- Arakan Army, Ta'ang National Liberation Army and Myanmar National Democratic Alliance Army- launched simultaneous attacks called Operation 1027 on several military bases and towns in north eastern Myanmar. Lashio airport was shut down, a bridge was blown up and two women and a child were killed due to the bombardment from the military.
- 28 October - Ye Htut, former Minister of Information under President Thein Sein, was arrested for inciting public unrest on social media.

=== November ===
- 1 November - The Three Brotherhood Alliance intensifies its attacks on junta outposts in northern Shan State as part of "Operation 1027".
- 3 November - China calls for an "immediate ceasefire" in Myanmar after rebels capture several towns near the Chinese border.
- 4 November - Ethnic armed groups in Myanmar take over multiple military outposts in northern Shan State, escalating hostilities and displacing over 23,000 people.
- 6 November -
  - Operation 1027:
    - Thailand announces its intention to evacuate 162 Thai human trafficking victims trapped near the Chinese border in Myanmar.
    - The Ministry of Foreign Affairs of the People's Republic of China urges the State Administration Council of Myanmar to cooperate with Chinese officials in protecting Chinese border villages, two days after a shell fired by the Tatmadaw kills one and wounds several in China.
    - The United Nations expresses concern about heavy fighting in Shan State, noting that over 30,000 people have been displaced thus far.
    - The People's Defence Force captures Kawlin in Sagaing Region after overrunning junta forces. It is the first district capital to fall to opposition forces. Many soldiers and police officers are reportedly killed.
- 8 November - Myanmar's junta leader Min Aung Hlaing calls up all military reservists to prepare for military operations to counter the recent offensives by rebel forces.
- 9 November - Myanmar state media reports that Tatmadaw-installed president Myint Swe expressed concern that the country will be split into multiple parts if the success of the rebel offensive continues.
- 10 November - Soe Htut, former Minister for Home Affairs, was sentenced to five years in prison for corruption.
- 12 November - A Myanmar Air Force fighter jet crashes in Kayah State near the border with Thailand. The Karenni Nationalities Defence Force claims responsibility for shooting it down, however the Tatmadaw claims the crash occurred due to a technical problem.
- 13 November -
  - The Chin National Army says that they captured a military base in Rikhawdar, Chin State, and are currently fighting for control of the town which is located on the border with India. More than 5,000 people flee across the border into India's Mizoram state.
  - Fighting occurs between the military and the Arakan Army in several townships in Rakhine State, with the Arakan Army claiming that it took several outposts.
- 14 November -
  - Operation 1027:
    - The Chin National Army says that it has successfully captured the border town of Rikhawdar in Chin State.
    - India deports 39 Myanmar Army soldiers who abandoned their positions and fled across the border into Mizoram. The soldiers were disarmed by the Assam Rifles before being sent back to Myanmar by helicopter.
  - Operation 1107:
    - Heavy fighting is reported in Loikaw, the capital of Kayah State, as Karenni rebel groups attempt to capture the city from the military.
- 15 November -
  - Operation 1027:
    - The pro-democracy National Unity Government says that over 200 junta troops and their families have surrendered to rebel forces near the border with China.
    - The military junta imposes a curfew in Sittwe, the capital of Rakhine State, with tanks reported on the city's streets. The Arakan Army reportedly captures dozens of policemen and soldiers.
    - The Myanmar National Democratic Alliance Army claims that an entire battalion of the military surrendered to the Three Brotherhood Alliance in Shan State.
    - Junta spokesperson Zaw Min Tun accuses rebel groups of "destroying the whole country" and says that reports of captured military bases are "propaganda".
  - Operation 1107: Karenni rebels in Kayah State capture Loikaw University, evacuating 170 members of the university staff and their families, as fighting continues in the city.
- 16 November - Operation 1027: The Arakan Army captures the town of Pauktaw, Rakhine State. The military responds by bombing the town with helicopters and warships.
- 17 November -
  - Operation 1027:
    - The military recaptures the town of Pauktaw, Rakhine State, from the Arakan Army following heavy bombardment of the town.
    - A Myanmar Air Force warplane bombs a school in Chin State, killing at least eight children.
  - Operation 1107: Karenni rebels overrun military forces sheltering inside the district courthouse in Loikaw, Kayah State, subsequently setting the building on fire as fighting continues in the city.
  - Canada, Denmark, France, Germany, the Netherlands, and the United Kingdom formally join the genocide case at the International Court of Justice against Myanmar, accusing Myanmar's military junta of committing genocide against the Rohingya people.
- 20 November - Operation 1107: Artillery fired by the military destroys a monastery in Loikaw, Kayah State, killing two monks.

=== December ===
- 11 December - Representatives from Myanmar's ruling military junta hold talks with three rebel groups, facilitated by China, amid an ongoing rebel offensive.
- 12 December - The United Nations Office on Drugs and Crime reports that Myanmar has surpassed Afghanistan as the world's largest producer of opium.
- 13 December -
  - Operation 1027: Allied rebel forces say that they have seized the town of Maw Luu in Sagaing Region.
  - The Three Brotherhood Alliance denies rumours of a possible peace deal brokered by China, saying that it will continue to fight the military.
- 16 December - Operation 1027: The Three Brotherhood Alliance claims to have captured Namhsan in the northern Shan State, following a joint offensive against the Myanmar military despite a temporary ceasefire mediated by China.

== Holidays ==
- 4 January – Independence Day
