= April 2010 Yangon Thingyan bombings =

Terrorist incident in Myanmar

- Part of Myanmar conflict
- Location: Yangon, Myanmar (Burma)
- Date: 15 April 2010; 3:00 pm (MMT)
- Target: Civilians
- Attack type: Bombing
- Deaths: 10
- Injuries: 178

The April 2010 Yangon Thingyan bombings were bomb blasts that had killed 10 people and injured 178 on 15 April 2010, in Yangon, Myanmar (Burma) during the Thingyan Water Festival.

== Background ==
Bombings inside or in the vicinity of Yangon have occurred on numerous occasions in the past. In April 2006, five bombs detonated in the centre of the city, no casualties were reported. In September 2008, a bomb exploded outside the Yangon City Hall killing 7 people and injured several others.

== Bombings ==
On 15 April 2010, three separate blasts occurred in front of the X2O water festival pavilion allegedly sponsored by Than Shwe's grandson near to Kandawgyi Lake, where hundreds of people were celebrating Water Festival.

== Investigations ==
Police Chief Khin Yi said that three members of Vigorous Burmese Student Warriors were responsible for the bomb blasts.

Phyo Wai Aung, an engineer charged with alleged involvement in the bombing, was sentenced to death in May 2012. He pleaded innocent to the charges and said he was tortured during questioning. He was released under a presidential pardon in August 2012 and died of liver cancer in January 2013.
