= Arakan National Council =

Arakan National Council ရခိုင်ပြည် အမျိုးသား ကောင်စီ
- Abbreviation: ANC
- President: Khin Maung
- Founded: 2004
- Armed wing: Arakan Army
- Ideology: Arakanese nationalism Self-determination; Federalism

Party flag

The Arakan National Council (Burmese: ရခိုင်ပြည် အမျိုးသား ကောင်စီ; abbreviated ANC) is an ethno-political organisation in Myanmar that campaigns for the interests of the Rakhine people. It was founded at a conference between Rakhine insurgent groups in-exile in 2004, and also has an armed wing in Kayin State, known as the Arakan Army.

Naing Soe, a senior leader of the ANC, was arrested in February 2018, following a series of bombings in Sittwe, the capital of Rakhine State. He was later released after police failed to provide evidence linking him to the bombings within 30 days as is required by police procedure.

On March 31, 2023, the ANC urged the National Unity Consultative Council to build an environment where all democratic and ethnic organizations in Myanmar can participate in building a federal union.
