= Saw O Moo =

Karen activist

Saw O Moo (1975 – 5 April 2018) was a Karen people activist in the Mutraw District of Myanmar who worked as an indigenous wildlife researcher, took on the role of a Luthaw Paw Day community forest coordinator, and actively advocated for Karen people land rights by campaigning for a number of years to establish a Karen people managed and Karen people governed 5,400 km^{2} Indigenous and Community Conservation Area in the Salween River basin.

Saw O Moo was born in 1975 at Ler Mu Plaw, Myanmar, where he married Naw Paw Tha, had 7 children, and since 2006 has partnered with the Karen Environmental and Social Action Network to establish a Karen people managed and governed Salween Peace Park including remnant old growth forests, plus habitats of Asiatic black bear and Sunda pangolins threatened by mercury pollution from goldmines and the Hat Gyi hydroelectric project

In August 2017 he assisted launch a documentary at Yangoon for World Indigenous Peoples Day. In October 2017 he travelled with 12 other Karen leaders to the Philippines to learn about Indigenous and Community Conserved Areas (ICCAs), and by December 2017 he was publicly promoting the proposed Salween Peace Park quoted as saying "For us as Indigenous people, the Salween Peace Park represents our deepest desires and needs,"

Saw O Moon died at Wah Klo Hat, Myanmar where he was reportedly shot by the Myanmar military who presumed him to be a plain clothes soldier with the Karen National Liberation Army The Salween Peace Park and Saw O Moo received the 2018 the Paul K. Feyerabend Award-- a World of Solidarity is Possible.
