= 2018 Sittwe bombings =

Terrorist incident in Myanmar

- Location: Sittwe, Rakhine State, Myanmar
- Date: 24 February 2018; 4:30 am (UTC+6:30)
- Attack type: Bombing
- Weapon: Improvised explosive devices
- Deaths: 0
- Injuries: 1
- Perpetrator: Rakhine nationalists (suspected)

The 2018 Sittwe bombings were a series of three bomb blasts in Sittwe, the capital of Myanmar's Rakhine State. One police officer received minor injuries from the blasts.

== Background ==
Ethnic Rakhine insurgent groups have been fighting the government of Myanmar since the early 1950s. Bombings are not uncommon in Myanmar due to the various ongoing insurgencies in the country, but they have been a rare occurrence in Rakhine State. However, Rakhine State has experienced an increase in guerrilla-style attacks by insurgents since 2016.

== Bombings ==
One of the bombs exploded at around 4:30 am (MMT) in the backyard of a residence belonging to Tin Maung Swe, a state government secretary, whilst the other two went off near a high court and a land record office. The blasts slightly injured a police officer. Authorities suspected that Swe was targeted because of his high position in the local administration. Three unexploded bombs were recovered and defused by authorities afterwards.

== Investigation ==
Seven suspects were arrested by the Myanmar Police Force immediately after the bombing, whilst two others were detained later in the investigation. Naing Soe, a senior leader of the Arakan National Council (ANC) was among those arrested.

On 26 March 2018, the police released five of the nine suspects, including Naing Soe, after they failed to find evidence against them within 30 days as police procedure requires. The released suspects were originally charged under Myanmar's counter-terrorism laws, but their release was ordered by the court after the police failed to show evidence linking them to the bombings. An extension for the police's remand of three of the suspects still detained was approved by the court on the same day; two of the suspects were accused of illegally crossing the Bangladesh–Myanmar border, whilst another was accused of being involved with a bombing in Mrauk U.
