= Nay Myo Zin =

Burmese activist

- နေမျိုးဇင်

Director of the Administrative Committee for Righteous Military Personnel of Karenni IEC
- Incumbent
- Assumed office 2024

Personal details
- Born: 10 June 1975 (age 51) Yangon, Myanmar
- Education: Defense Services Academy
- Occupation: Activist and former military officer

Military service
- Allegiance: Burma
- Branch/service: Myanmar Army
- Years of service: 1998-2005
- Rank: Major
- Unit: 262nd Infantry Provost Division

Nay Myo Zin (Burmese: နေမျိုးဇင်; born 10 June 1975) is a Burmese activist, former army captain, and former political prisoner who has faced imprisonment multiple times due to his political activities. He is known for advocating farmers' rights, speaking out against the Tatmadaw, and handling politically sensitive cases against the Burmese military generals.

== Early life ==
Nay Myo Zin was born on 10 June 1975, to Ngwe Zin and Khin Thi in Yangon, Myanmar. His parents are originally from Myeik. His father was a senior clerk at the Myanma Oil and Gas Enterprise. He is the third son among five siblings.

== Military career ==
Graduating from the 39th intake of the Defense Services Academy, he was appointed as a second lieutenant in the Myanmar Army on April 10, 1998. He has served as a battalion commander in the 19th Infantry Division in Hswar. Nay Myo Zin was involved in military operations in Karen State and Kayah State. In May 2005, while serving as a provost commander in the 262nd Infantry Provost Division, Eastern Regional Military Command, in Taunggyi, he resigned from the Myanmar Army at the rank of captain. Following his resignation, he left for Singapore to work as a container truck driver.

== Political activities ==
In 2005, Nay Myo Zin became active in political movements and started writing internet blogs. He also contributed as a former military officer on DVB radio's weekly broadcast program for soldiers. During the 2007 Saffron Revolution, he resigned from his job and returned to Myanmar from Singapore.

In March 2011, he was sentenced to 10 years in prison under the Electronics Transactions Act, becoming the first political prisoner during President Thein Sein's administration. The Assistance Association for Political Prisoners (AAPP) called his release on the government and expunged his criminal record. On January 13, 2012, however, he was released under a presidential pardon. On the day of his release, he immediately recharged under Article 42. The prison administration filed charges accusing him of bringing in a shirt with the image of General Aung San and a keychain with the image of Aung San Suu Kyi into Insein Prison. However, on February 1, 2012, the Insein Township Court ruled that he was not guilty.

In 2012, Nay Myo Zin founded the charity organization Myanmar Social Development Network that digs wells for impoverished villagers and campaigns for an end to the decades-old insurgency in Myanmar.

In December 2014, Nay Myo Zin was arrested for protesting in front of the Chinese embassy in Yangon, seeking justice for the killing of farmer Khin Win by the police at the Letpadaung Copper Mine site. He was sentenced to four years and four months by the Dagon Township Court.

Nay Myo Zin was arrested in April 2019 for criticizing the Burmese military's role in politics and calling for constitutional reform. He made a speech including the phrase "the general build mansion, soldier have crutch" during a support event for the 2008 Constitution Amendment and the Union Parliament Amendment Committee in Wakema Township. These statements challenged the military, leading to Nay Myo Zin facing several legal charges filed by military officials at the Taikkyi Township, Wakema Township, Khin-U Township, and Kawthaung Township courts, respectively. The court deemed his statements an attempt to provoke unrest similar to the 8888 Uprising. On June 7, outside the court, over 50 supporters of Nay Myo Zin wore white outfits featuring his photo and a written message opposing the legal charges filed by the military. During the court release, approximately 50 police officers were deployed to provide security and oversee the transport of Nay Myo Zin in the prison van. He was sentenced to two years in prison in September 2019.

For his outspoken criticism of top Burmese military leaders, Nay Myo Zin was named in The Irrawaddy's article "Myanmar's Movers and Shakers of 2019".

Nay Myo Zin was also imprisoned in the aftermath of the 2021 Myanmar coup d'état. He was later released from prison in August 2022 and managed to secretly escape into the jungle with the help of the People's Defense Forces (PDF). On 27 April 2023, his homes and business property were confiscated by the military council.

In 2024, Nay Myo Zin was appointed as the director of the Administrative Committee for Righteous Military Personnel by the Karenni State Interim Executive Council.
