= Blue Ribbon campaign (Myanmar) =

In Myanmar, teachers from the technological and computer universities and some medical universities launched a blue ribbon campaign to protest what they called the unfair promotion policy of the Ministry of Education.

The campaign was officially launched on July 31, 2017, and the pre-movement started on July 25 in some universities.
