= Letpadaung Copper Mine =

Mine in Myanmar

Letpadaung
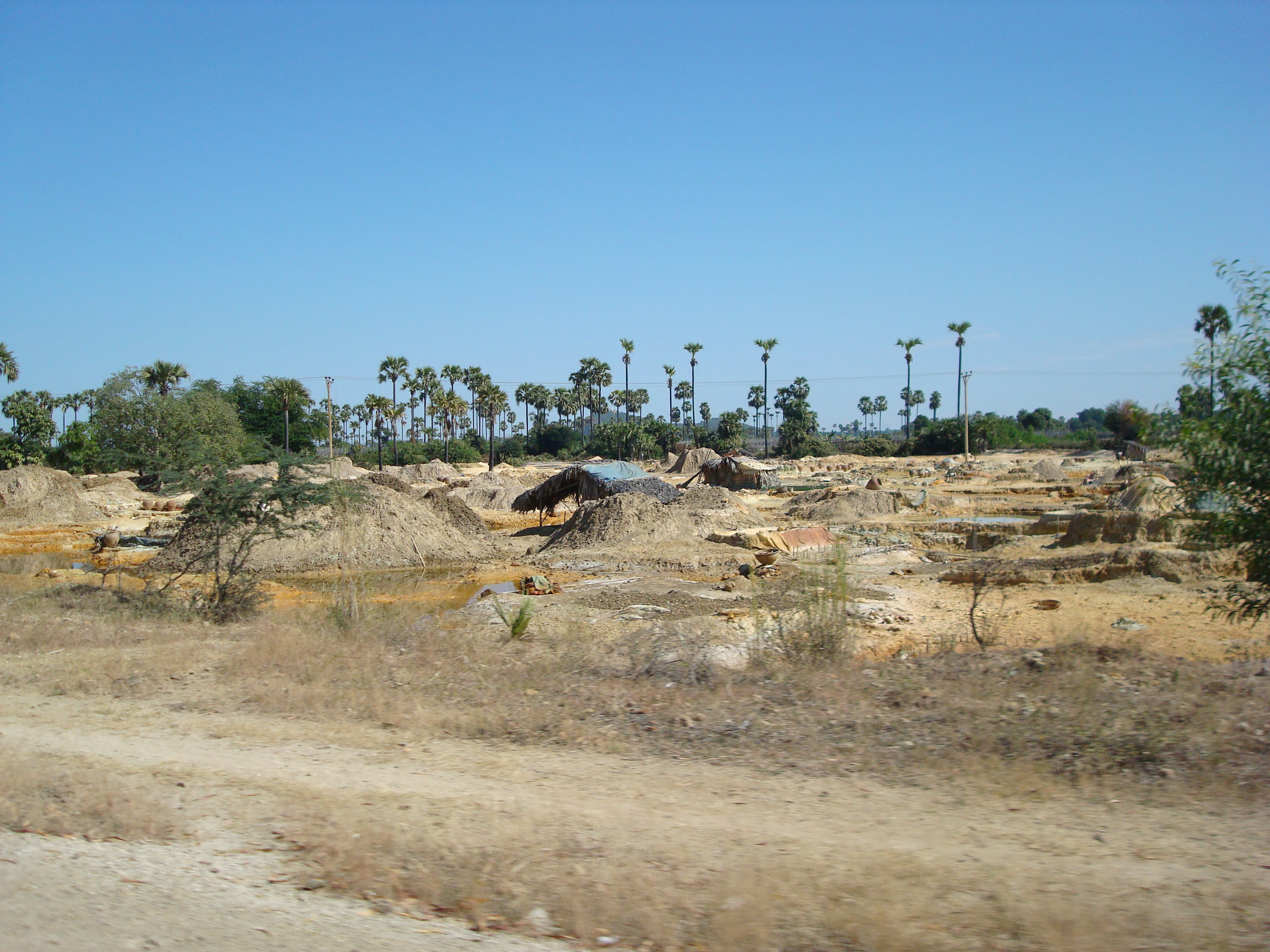
- Artisanal mines near Letpadaung Mountain. Many of the people who work these mines were displaced by the mine project. They process ore mined by Wanbao

Highest point
- Elevation: 162 m (531 ft)
- Coordinates: 22°07′12″N 95°02′13″E

Geography
- Location: Sagaing, Myanmar

The Letpadaung Copper Mine (Burmese: လက်ပံတောင်းတောင် ကြေးနီသတ္တုတွင်း) is a large surface mine in the Salingyi Township of Sagaing Region of Myanmar. Since Myanmar began liberalizing in 2011, the mine has been the site of contentious protest and has come to symbolize the shortcomings of political reform. Villagers displaced by the Chinese-operated mine contend that they have not received fair compensation while the company claims that it has been socially responsible throughout the process.

== Background ==
Letpadaung is a large mine project operated by the Wanbao Mining Copper Ltd., in cooperation with the Union of Myanmar Economic Holdings Ltd. (UMEHL) Wanbao, a subsidiary of China North Industries Group Corp. or Norinco, a large arms manufacturer, bought the project from Ivanhoe, a Canadian mining company in 2011. Ivanhoe had won the initial project from the Myanmar government pursuant to a series of agreements and feasibility studies from 1994 to 1996. The joint venture agreement was signed on April 10, 1996. Ivanhoe divested its share of the project in 2011, citing the impact of the stigma of working with the military government on its other business throughout the world. The final agreement with Wanbao, reached after protests in 2012, gave it a 30% share of the eventual profits, 19% going to UMEHL, a massive military-owned company and 51% to Myanmar’s government. A later agreement gave 2% of profits to local development. The project is reported to have cost approximately $1 billion to develop.

=== China ===
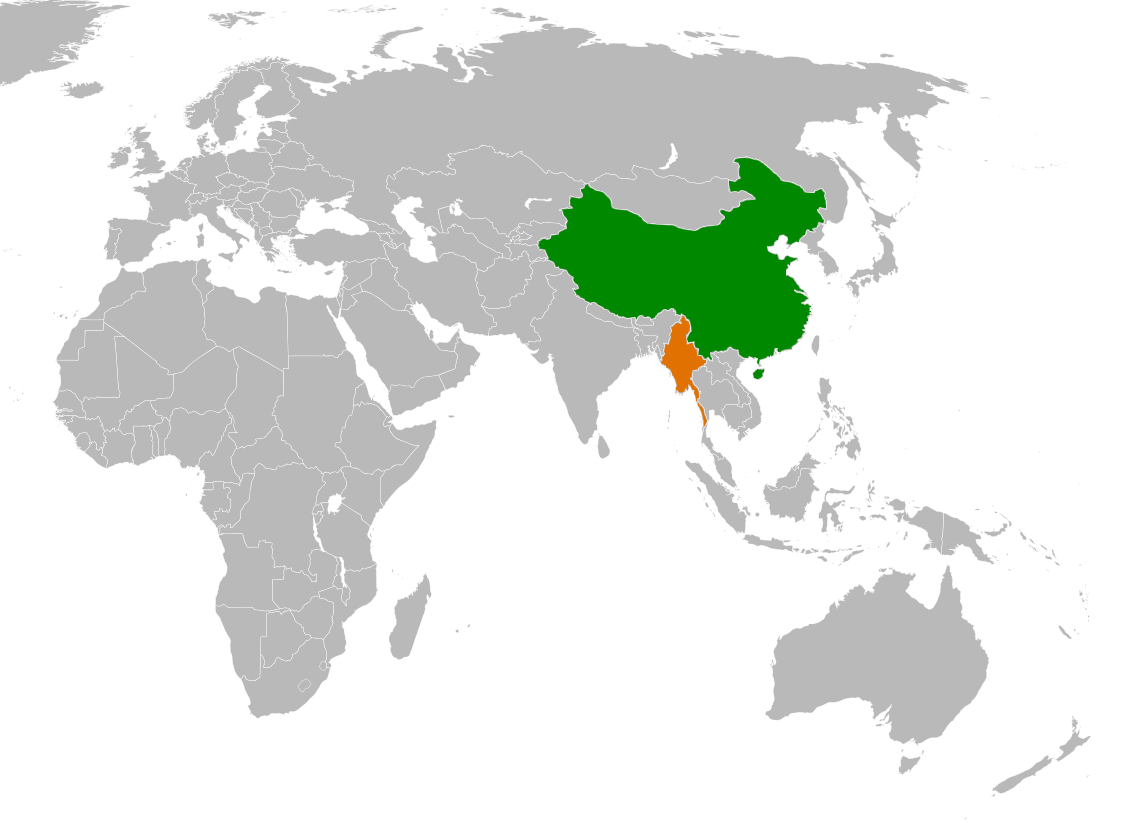
People's Republic of China and the Republic of the Union of Myanmar

Through its decades of economic isolation resulting from economic sanctions, Myanmar found China a critical ally and investment partner. However the large projects undertaken with China often served to exacerbate anti-China sentiment in the country, which has always had a contentious relationship with its northern neighbor. Though a substantial ethnic-Chinese population has long been a part of Myanmar’s demographic landscape, an influx of Chinese immigrants with business connections in Northern Myanmar over the past 20 years has caused tensions and anti-Chinese feelings to rise.

Like many issues in Myanmar, anti-Chinese feelings have come to the surface and been manipulated since the democratic transition removed censorship and created a new political economy. In September 2011 the Thein Sein government abandoned the Myitsone Dam project in Kachin State. Ninety percent of the electricity produced by the $3.6 billion dam would have gone to China, which, combined with its environmental impact, led to broad protest in Myanmar.

More recently, the Director of Myanmar’s railway ministry, Myint Wai, announced in July 2014 the cancelation of a proposed $20 billion railway link between Myanmar’s oil-producing Rakhine State and China’s Yunnan Province citing “public demand.” Some, however, speculate that the Myanmar government simply decided that the long timescale of the project would not provide it ample revenue, and that the termination of economic sanctions has given it other options.

And despite these few lags in the economic relationship between the two countries, A large number of projects are still under way. During a visit to Myanmar in November 2014 by Chinese Premier Li Keqiang, China and Myanmar signed investment deals in energy, agriculture, telecommunications, infrastructure and finance worth $7.8 billion. Like Letpadaung, the controversial Kyaukpyu-Kunming oil pipeline has been built despite massive public protest. Many in Rakhine State resent their small share of revenues.

== Villager grievances ==
Villagers protesting the Letpadaung copper mine have expressed dissatisfaction with the resettlement process, compensation schemes, environmental and health effects, and the destruction of an important religious site. The compensation plan offered to the displaced villagers has been at the center of the protests since the beginning of the project. The agreement between Wanbao and the Myanmar Government held the company to certain standards of compensation, social spending and employment for residents. Wanbao and the Myanmar government have made claims of fairly compensating villagers which villagers and rights groups like Amnesty International have rejected as inadequate.

Geng Yi, Wanbao’s local representative told The Economist magazine in May 2014 that the company was spending even more than required by that agreement. He claimed that the company spent $1.8m on “corporate social responsibility” work in 2013, which he said was more than the $1m that the contract requires each year. Additionally, 2% of profits are supposed to be allocated to local villages when the mine is operational.

In December 2014 Wanbao Spokesman Dong Yunfei said in an Interview with the Democratic Voice of Burma (DVB) that the company intends to offer compensation to all 1,032 villagers affected by the mine. He said that about 70% of villagers have accepted the compensation offered by the company and that they have been working with and listening to affected villagers. For example, through “door-to-door consultations” the company learned that many of those who have not accepted the plan and are protesting want higher compensation. The company has tried to accommodate, he claimed. In July they began a “Livelihood Contribution Plan” to help people who were promised jobs at the mine but which can only be fulfilled once the mine is totally operational.

In statements Wanbao has conceded that about 100 villagers have refused to discuss compensation, despite several attempts. They have refused even to admit Wandbao employs, government officials and police officers into the “three old villages” in which they live. “We learnt that quite a few villagers are actually willing to talk to us, but a few trouble-makers won’t let them,” Dong said, and added that the company would only pursue the matter through peaceful dialogue.

Villagers, international rights groups and Myanmar activists have contested the fairness of the compensation scheme. Amnesty International, estimates that approximately 2,500 villagers have been affected by the project, more than twice the company figure of 1,032 affected, on what villagers say is 8,000 acres of land from 26 villages. The mine and the support industries that have followed it have radically increased the price of land in the area, making it harder for displaced villagers to settle nearby and devaluating their compensation. Amnesty International has said that the community consultation process was inadequate and that villagers who refused to be relocated were excluded from discussion. Wanbao allegedly excluded them from consultation on direction of the Myanmar Government. As recently as November 2014 Amnesty International urged the government to stop work at the project, citing a flawed acquisition process, the presence of environmental and social repercussions and the lack of official accountability regarding violence against protesters at the mine in 2012.

Villagers near the mine claim that the sulfuric acid plant on the mine’s property is rendering the surrounding farmland infertile and leading to an increase in the number of children born blind.

== November 2012 white phosphorus ==
Accounts of the violence that erupted on the morning of November 29, 2012 vary widely between protesters and rights groups on one hand and the government on the other. Thousands of villagers, monks and activists had been participating in protests at the mine site for the previous three months. Protests had generally taken the form of a sit-in, though in recent weeks protesters had become more daring, possibly emboldened by the recent visit of American President Barack Obama. Recently protesters had begun blockading the sulfuric acid factory that has been the subject of intense condemnation. Protesters had also been blocking bulldozers and trucks. National League for Democracy Chairwoman Aung San Suu Kyi, daughter of Burmese independence leader Aung San and the most popular opposition figure in the country, was to meet with protesters at the mine on the morning of the following day, November 30, to hear their grievances.

Police claim that they repeatedly warned the protesters to leave, saying that they had tolerated the “illegal” protest for a long time but that the addition of people from other areas and “outside groups” had forced their hand. Police Lieutenant Colonel Thura Thwin Ko Ko, 49, one of commanders on duty during the clean-up, claims that protesters were warned fifteen times to disperse. Protesters dispute this narrative, saying that they were taken totally by surprise by the police move. A truckload of police arrived at the site of the protests shortly before the dispersal. Protesters say they formed in ranks to withstand the police action but were put to a run as soon as it began.

Protesters claim that they were fired upon by a combination of water cannon, tear gas, and an unspecific incendiary device. The protesters scrambled as six explosions rang out, fired from what some called flare guns; "They fired black balls that exploded into fire sparks. They shot about six times. People ran away and they followed us," one protester told The Guardian. The incendiary devices exploded, sometimes in the laps of praying monks, throwing sparks and burning material onto the clothes and skin of other protesters. Many of those hospitalized had black spots and burns over much of their bodies, which indicate the use of white phosphorus in the incendiary devices.

Lawyers Network and Justice Trust. an unofficial investigation group, published a report after the event which included lab results from a canister found at the scene indicating the presence of phosphorus. The sticky substance thrown by the canisters stuck to tents and people and could not be extinguished by pulling off, rolling on the ground or dousing with water. Estimates of the number of people injured in the operation range from 68 to over 100, mostly monks. Many of the monks were hospitalized for several weeks in Mandalay, Monyua and Bangkok. Operations at the mine were suspended until a commission could determine what happened.

Two types of munitions were found at the mine after the clearing. One had CS written on it, an abbreviation for 2-chlorobenzalmalononitrile, the active ingredient in tear gas. The other, smaller munitions bore no marking. Lieutenant Colonel Thura Thwin Ko Ko later claimed that the police thought that the munitions they were firing were all tear gas.

== Letpadaung Taung Investigation Commission Report ==
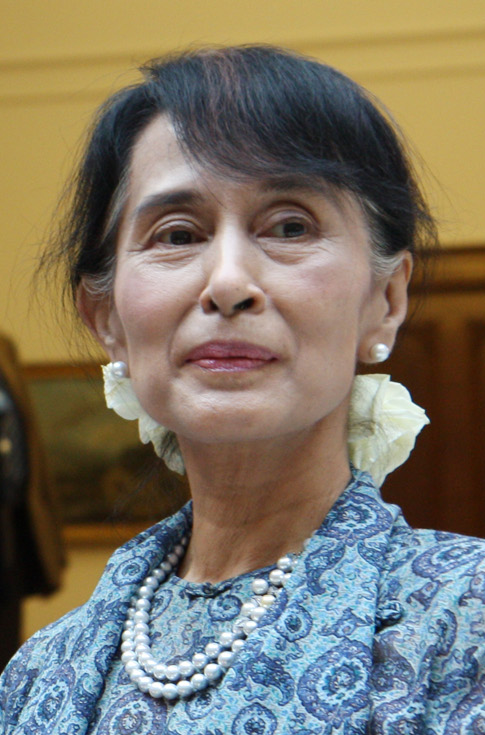
NLD Chair Aung San Suu Kyi

In the wake of the November clash a parliamentary investigation commission was established to investigate the clashes and larger problems at the mine. The commission, chaired by Aung San Suu Kyi and made up of ministers, members of parliament and company representative, missed several deadlines before releasing a report containing 42 recommendations concerning land utilization, environment, compensation and society, and religious concerns. It recognized that the mine had not met international environmental or social standards and did not compensate villagers sufficiently.

To the disappointment of many protesters, however, the commission did not recommend the closing of the mine. Though it acknowledged the minimal direct benefit that the mine gave to Myanmar, the commission recommended that the mine remain open, citing Myanmar’s fragile relationship with China and the impact that shuttering such a large project could have on Myanmar’s internal investment climate.

The commission provided for the creation of a Committee for the Implementation of the Letpadaung Report, tasked with implementing the recommendations outlined in the report. That committee has since come under intense criticism for a lack of transparency and sluggishness in implementing changes, not least from Aung San Suu Kyi, who claimed after the shooting in December 2014 that violence had erupted because of the Implementation Committee’s failure to implement the Investigation Committee’s recommendations.

In response to criticisms from Aung San Suu Kyi, Tin Myint, a member of the investigation committee and the secretary of the implementation committee, said on January 8, 2015 that criticisms were unfounded. In its annual report the committee claimed to have already implemented 29 of the Investigation Committee’s recommendations, and to be in the process of implementing the remaining 13.

== December 2014 shooting ==
On December 22, 2014 approximately 200 villagers were protesting the erecting of a border fence on 1,000 acres of farmland seized by the mine. The land was owned by villagers who had refused to accept the compensation plan offered by the mine. Villagers allegedly protested by throwing rocks and firing slingshots at workers and the police officers brought with them, and by physically blocking the work. In an interview with the Democratic Voice of Burma, a villager from Sete claimed that “The police stood in a line, armed with riot shields, and warned the villagers they would be shot if they did not move…The protestors tried to block them from entering the plots and refused to give in.”

When police opened fire one woman, 56-year-old woman from Mogyopin village, was shot in the head and died shortly afterwards. Another man was shot in the leg. The ministry of information said in a statement that eleven police officers and nine protesters were injured in the clash, though some media sources have questioned that number. The following day renewed protests were met with more resistance from police, who fired rubber bullets into the crowd, injuring two or three protesters.

Wanbao’s public relations manager Cao Desheng expressed regret at the shooting and put blame on the police:

We know nothing about the police’s handling before the accident happened…We made no request for the police to use any kind of violence…On behalf of everyone at Wanbao we extend our deepest sympathies and heartfelt condolences to her [Daw Khin Win’s] family and share in their grief at this difficult time…We understand the police were at the scene, and we hope they will start investigating this event.

The Myanmar Ministry of Information issued a report, run in state media outlets, which took a less conciliatory note than the statement made by Wanbao. The report said that tensions erupted when a group of about 30 protesting villagers prevented a bulldozer from clearing a path for an extension of the border fence by lying on the ground. Wanbao employees were:

[Wanbao employees were] targeted by slingshot fire by 15 villagers from the same group, whereby security forces retaliated by firing three warning shots from 12-bolt crowd control guns…Despite efforts to dilute tensions, around 100 villagers who had been disturbing the third work team near Ingyin Hill snatched signal flags off the [Wanbao staff], set those on fire, and surrounded the 10 workers…At 11:15am, security forces demanded the villagers release the 10 workers; in response the villagers demanded the construction vehicles and machinery used in the fence construction be removed from the site…Negotiations failed and tensions rose to the point of danger. The security forces again fired eight shots to disperse the crowd…The security forces then successfully rescued the 10 workers. Eleven police officers and nine villagers were injured in the incident. Daw Khin Win of Mogyopyin died from injuries.

After the incident, Aung San Suu Kyi blamed the administration of President Thein Sein for the shooting and the violence at the mine in general. Referring to the report that the commission she chaired filed after violence at the mine in 2012, Aung San Suu Kyi said;

We have provided ample recommendations. They [the Thein Sein administration] have to implement their fair share. If they want [me] to do it all, then hand over administrative power [to me] so that I can do everything…The committee did carry out some recommendations, but it has not fully implemented the recommendations. It has not followed the recommendations to the letter.

On December 29, a week after the shooting of Daw Khin Win, dozens of protesters tussled with police outside of the Chinese embassy in Yangon where they were attempting to lay a wreath to commemorate her death. Protesters also called for an end to violence at the mine. The following morning Nay Myo Zin, an activist and former Myanmar military servicemen, was arrested by waiting police as he began the trip to the Letpadaung site. Though they did not give specific charges, police allegedly told Nay Myo Zin that his arrest was due to his participation in the protests of the night before. Fellow activists Naw Ohn Hla, Daw Sein Htwe and Tin Ptut Paing were apparently arrested the same morning.
