= Naw Ohn Hla =

Burmese politician

- နီၢ်အိလး (နော်အုံးလှ)
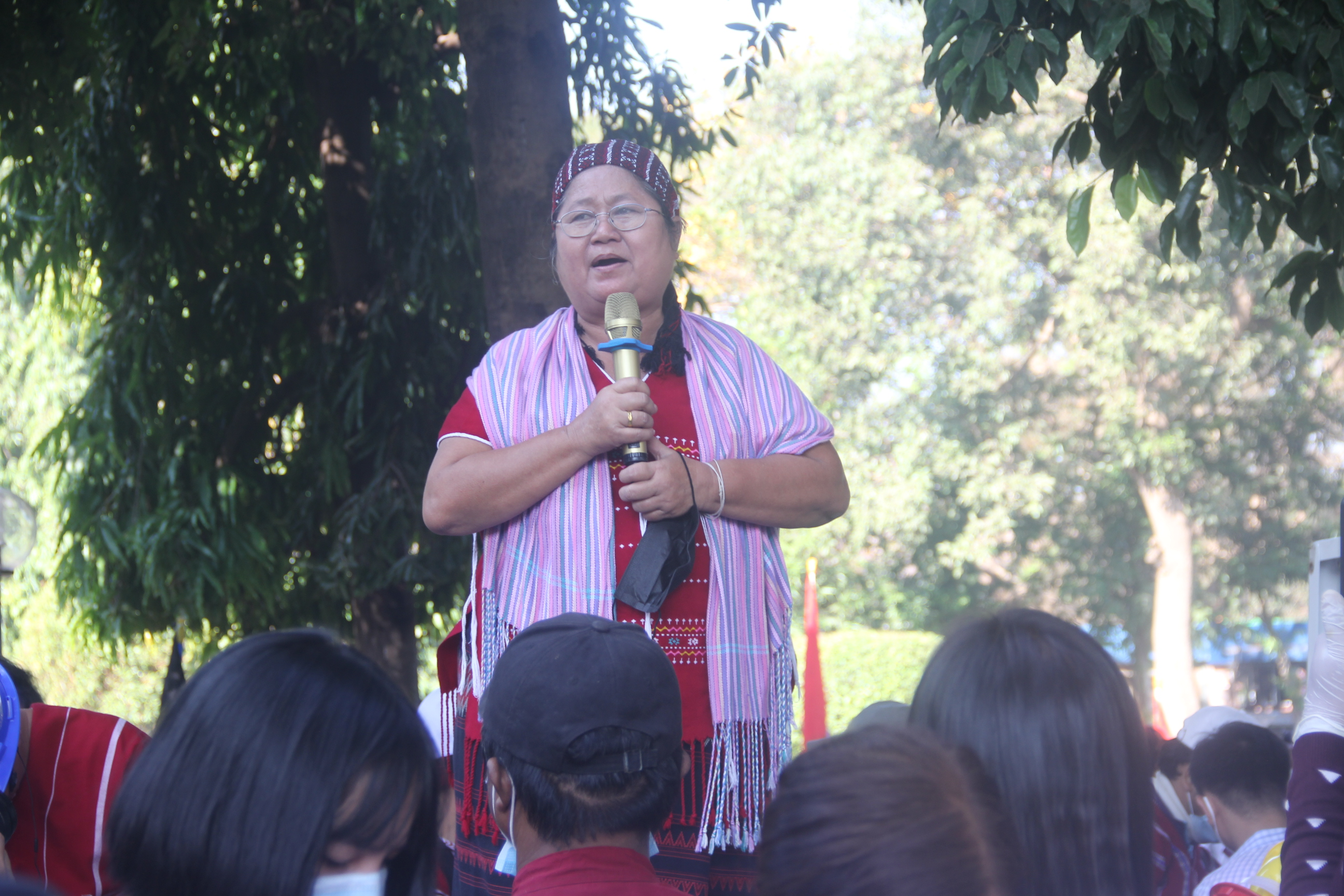
- Born: 5 August 1962 (age 63); Myanmar
- Occupations: Human rights defender, Environmental rights, Democracy activist, Politician
- Known for: Land rights activist, former political prisoner
- Political party: United Nationalities Democracy Party (UNDP)
- Parent: U Thein Aung (father)

Naw Ohn Hla (S'gaw Karen: နီၢ်အိလး; Burmese: နော်အုံးလှ; born 5 August 1962) is a Karen democracy activist, politician, human rights defender, environmental rights and land rights activist for decades. She has been active in campaigning against the Letpadaung mining project in northern Myanmar. Naw Ohn Hla is the general secretary of United Nationalities Democracy Party (UNDP).

== Early life and education ==
Naw was born on 5 August 1962 in Karen state to ethnic Karen parents, a daughter of Thein Aung. She lives in Yangon.

== Career and movement ==
Naw Ohn Hla is an advocate for land rights and political prisoners, and has been imprisoned on more than ten occasions since 1989, as a result of her peaceful efforts to free political prisoners and assist Buddhist monks during the 2007 uprising. She works for the promotion of human rights and environmental rights. She also campaigned for the release of Aung San Suu Kyi while the opposition leader was under house arrest.

Naw Ohn Hla repeatedly called for the suspension of the Chinese-backed Letpadaung mining project in Burma's Sagaing Region. The project is strongly opposed by local communities due its damaging effect on the environment. She was sentenced in 2013 August to two years in prison for protesting without permission against the Letpadaung copper mine. On 15 November 2013, she was one of 69 political prisoners released by a pardon from President Thein Sein.

Naw Ohn Hla was arrested again over a 29 November 2014 protest against the mining project, at which a Chinese flag was burned outside the Chinese Embassy in Yangon. Naw Ohn Hla faced up to two years in jail for flag-burning case was arrested on 30 December 2014. At this time she was subject to a separate lawsuit for organizing prayers in 2007 for opposition leader Aung San Suu Kyi, who was then under house arrest. Naw Ohn Hla had also faced charges of violating the Peaceful Assembly Law in different townships court across Yangon (Pabedan, Kyauktada, Latha, and Lanmadaw) with regards to the embassy protest.

On 15 May 2015, the Dagon Township Court in Yangoon found Naw Ohn Hla guilty and sentenced her to four years and four months in prison. Naw Ohn Hla was also sentenced to four months in prison prior to this verdict on 2 April 2015 by the Bahan Township Court, for violating the Peaceful Assembly Law during a protest on 29 September 2014. Naw Ohn Hla was serving in a prison sentence of six years and two months in Insein Prison for protesting but was released on 17 April 2016 due to a Presidential amnesty from President of Myanmar Htin Kyaw.

Naw Ohn Hla is co-founder of the Rangoon-based Democracy and Peace Women Network (DPWN), which raises awareness of human rights, land rights and also campaigns against domestic violence. The Yangoon-based DPWN was honored with an N-Peace Awards, under the category of "Thinking Outside the Box" in October 2014.

In 2019, Naw Ohn Hla was awarded the Karen Women of Courage Award by International Karen Organization (IKO) and honorable certificate by Karen National Union (KNU) and N-Peace Award (Thinking Outside of the Box) (2014).

In 2020, Naw Ohn Hla contested the post of Yangon Region Government ethnic Karen affairs minister in the 2020 general elections representing United Nationalities Democracy Party (UNDP). She was also awarded the Civil Rights Defender of the Year 2020 by the Civil Rights Defenders, based in Stockholm, Sweden.
