= 2018 Lashio bombing =

Bomb blast in Lashio, Myanmar

- Location: 22°56′17″N 97°44′47″E; Lashio, Shan State, Myanmar
- Date: 21 February 2018; 4:30 pm (UTC+6:30)
- Attack type: Bombing
- Deaths: 2
- Injuries: 22

The 2018 Lashio bombing was a bomb blast in the town of Lashio, in northern Shan State, Myanmar, that killed two employees of Yoma Bank and injured 22 others.

== Background ==
Bombings are not uncommon in Shan State, where there is an ongoing conflict between the government of Myanmar and various insurgent groups. However, bombings tend to be small-scale and civilian casualties are rare.

== Bombing ==
At around 4:30 pm (MMT) on 21 February 2018, a bomb exploded between two banks, Yoma Bank and Aya Bank, immediately killing two employees of the former. Twenty-two others were injured in the blast.

== Aftermath ==
On 23 February 2018, the government of Shan State announced it would compensate victims of the bombing, offering 500,000 kyats ($375 USD) to the families of the two deceased and 200,000 to 300,000 kyats to those injured.
