= 2015 Kokang offensive =

2015 military operations in Myanmar

Coordinates: 23°41′30″N 98°45′45″E

- Part of Myanmar conflict
- Location of the Kokang Self-Administered Zone (green) within Shan State (yellow).
Date	9 February 2015 – June 2015
Location	Kokang Self-Administered Zone, Myanmar
Result	Burmese government victory: Insurgents fail to capture Laukkai and are forced to flee to China
Territorial changes	No territorial changes

Belligerents
Myanmar; Myanmar Army	People's Government of Kokang; MNDAA; Supported by: Arakan Army; TNLA

Commanders and leaders
Min Aung Hlaing	Pheung Kya-shin

Strength
Unknown	Initial 1,000; later 3,000–4,000 total with reinforcements

Casualties and losses
126 killed 59 wounded	80–90 killed 200+ wounded
- ~200 killed in total Over 50,000 civilians displaced

The 2015 Kokang offensive was a series of military operations launched by the Myanmar Army in 2015 in Kokang in northern Shan State, Myanmar (Burma). Several clashes between the Myanmar Army and Myanmar National Democratic Alliance Army had taken place from February to May 2015.

== Background ==
The Myanmar National Democratic Alliance Army (MNDAA) is an insurgent group in Myanmar that was formerly part of the Communist Party of Burma. It became the first of a dozen armed factions to sign a bilateral ceasefire agreement with the then-ruling military junta after it broke apart from the communists in 1989. The Shan State Special Region 1 was created for the group to govern autonomously, and the MNDAA, under the leadership of Pheung Kya-shin, maintained the ceasefire with the government from 1989 to 2009.

The ceasefire was broken in 2009 when the MNDAA came under pressure to transform into a paramilitary Border Guard Force under the control of the Burmese Army. The MNDAA resisted this move, and hostilities from the army increased, purportedly due to MNDAA's links with the drug trade. After the 2009 Kokang incident, Pheung himself was driven out by his competitors from within the army and had fled after a warrant was issued for his arrest.

In December 2014, he told Chinese state media in an interview that the MNDAA was trying to regain some territories it lost in 2009.

== Resurgence ==
After six years of relative calm, fighting was first reported on 9 February 2015 in Laukkaing Township, Kokang Self-Administered Zone in the northern part of Shan state near Sino-Burmese border. The MNDAA troops, who were trying to retake the Kokang self-administered zone, had attacked Burmese army outposts near the town of Mawhtike on 9 February. Further fighting broke out in Tashwehtan, northwest of Laukkai in the morning of 10 February as Burmese army reinforcements arrived in the region.

According to state-run newspaper, Global New Light of Myanmar, 200 Kokang insurgents, as opposed to government-loyal Kokang units, attacked an army military base in the Konkyan Township and shelled the army headquarters on 12 February. Myanmar government announced state of emergency on 17 February.

The MNDAA's allies, the Arakan Army (AA) and Ta’ang National Liberation Army (TNLA) were also fighting alongside the MNDAA. Some sources indicated that the Kachin Independence Army (KIA), United Wa State Army and National Democratic Alliance Army were also involved, but KIA denied its involvement.

After fighting for four months, Myanmar army troops had seized the last stronghold of MNDAA on 14 May 2015. MNDAA declared a unilateral ceasefire on 11 June and Myanmar government offered a peace deal on 22 June 2015.

The MNDAA is thought to be under the command of former leader Pheung Kya-shin, who was ousted from his position by a government-backed Kokang faction in 2009 and has since lived in relative obscurity in China.

== Civilians and refugees ==
The conflict had forced 40,000 to 50,000 civilians to flee their homes and seek shelter on the Chinese side of the border while some 4,500 others had taken refuge in Lashio, Shan State.

A convoy of the Myanmar Red Cross Society, clearly marked with red cross insignia which was carrying its staff and at least two journalists, was attacked by MNDAA troops on 17 February after an aid mission in Laukkai Township. One member of the convoy was killed and another was injured in the attack. But MNDAA spokesperson, Tun Myat Lin, denied the charge.

On 13 March, a bomb hit a sugarcane field in Lincang, China killing four people and wounding nine others with Chinese government demanding a full investigation. Burmese government issued a formal apology to China acknowledging the cross-border bombing. Another five people from Lincang were injured on 14 May.

== 2015 fighting ==
At least 30 people died on 6 March 2015. Authorities said Kokang rebels dressed in police uniforms and launched a surprise raid. The clashes are some of the worst to break out in the Kokang region since fighting in 2015 left scores dead.

== Child soldiers ==
It was reported by Reuters in March 2015 that the MNDAA uses child soldiers in the conflict.

== Foreign support ==
Burmese Minister for Information Ye Htut called on Chinese government to rein in any local officials who might be helping the group on their side of the border. According to Military intelligence of Myanmar, MNDAA forces are being supported by unemployed former Chinese soldiers of China's People's Liberation Army recruited as mercenaries. However, Chinese government has stated that it did not give military assistance to MNDAA and TNLA spokesman rejected the assertions by the Burmese government.
