= Ratchaburi =

Ratchaburi ราชบุรี Rajburi, Rat Buri
- Town
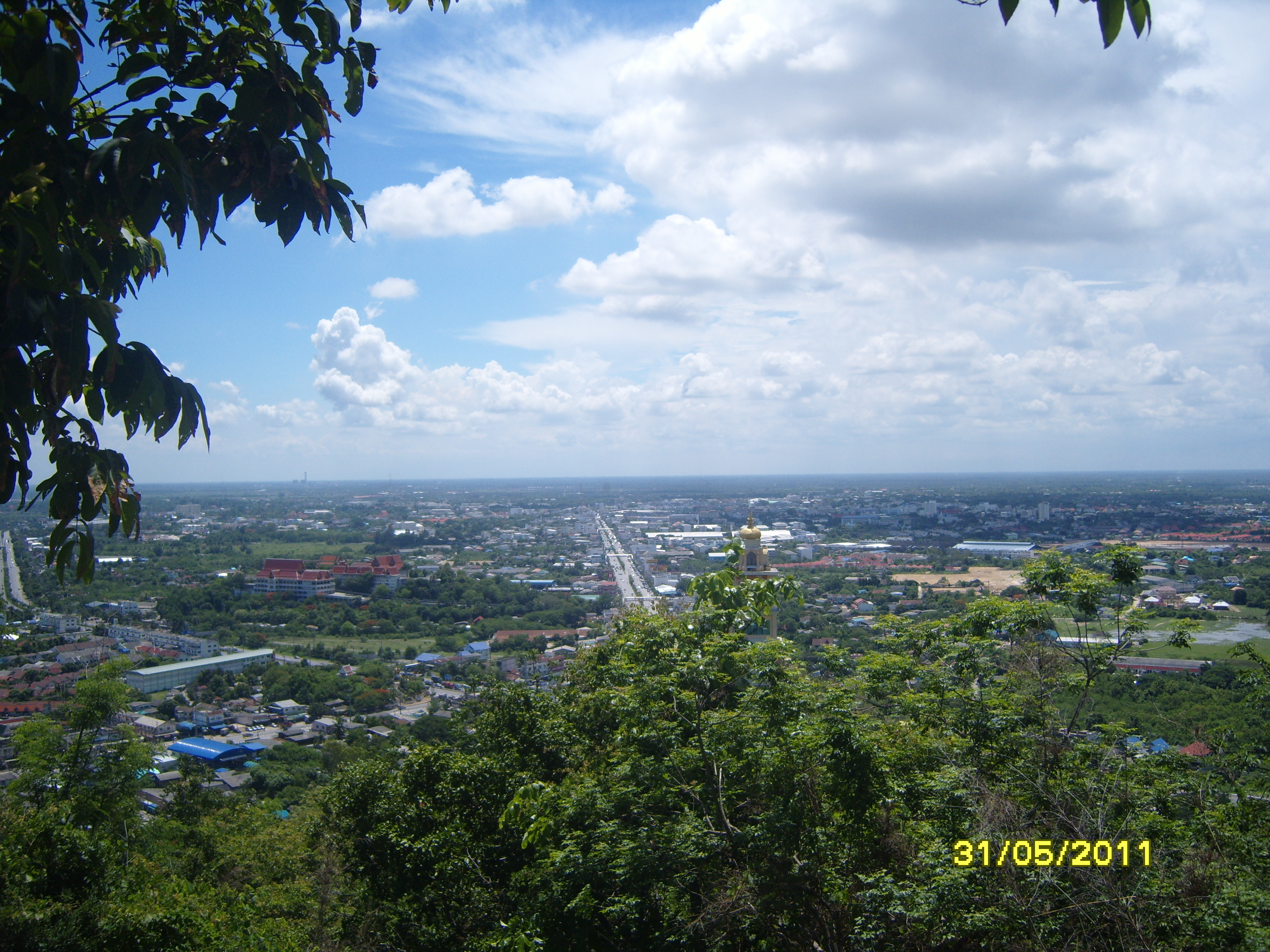
- View of Ratchaburi from Kaen Chan hill

- Location within Thailand
- Coordinates: 13°32′8″N 99°48′48″E
- Country: Thailand
- Province: Ratchaburi Province
- District: Mueang Ratchaburi District
- Subdistrict: Na Mueang

Area
  - Total: 8.70 km^{2} (3.36 sq mi)

Population (2018)
  - Total: 36,040
  - Density: 4,142.52/km^{2} (10,729.1/sq mi)
- Time zone: UTC+7 (ICT)
- Website: www.rbm.go.th

Ratchaburi (Thai: ราชบุรี, pronounced [râːt.t͡ɕʰā.bū.rīː]; also rendered as Rajburi or Rat Buri) is a historic town (thesaban mueang) in western Thailand and the capital of Ratchaburi Province. The area shows early settlement associated with Dvaravati culture and later became an important trade centre in the Ayutthaya period.

Ratchaburi town covers the entire tambon Na Mueang (หน้าเมือง) of Mueang Ratchaburi District. As of 2018 it had an estimated population of 36,040, down from 38,149 in 2005.

== History ==
The earliest evidence of settled habitation is that of the Dvaravati culture. At one time it was thought that the early town was founded on the coast of the Gulf of Thailand, and that over time the coast had moved 30 km (18 miles) away to the south, due to sedimentation coming down the Mae Klong River. However, geological and palynological investigation has shown that these early Dvaravati and proto-Dvaravati towns were all inland, at the edges of swamps when founded. Ratchaburi remains an important commercial centre, however. Archeological discoveries show that the area was already settled in the Bronze Age, and the town itself is known to have existed for at least two thousand years.

In the 13th-century, King Ram Khamhaeng seized Ratchaburi and incorporated it into the Sukhothai Kingdom. Later it was an important trade centre in the Ayutthaya Kingdom. In 1768 the Burmese (who had recently destroyed Ayutthaya) were thrown out of Ratchaburi by King Taksin, and the town became part of Siam.

In 2000, a splinter group of Karen activists from Burma, known as God's Army, briefly took the Ratchaburi hospital staff and patients hostage, before the siege was ended by the Thai army.

== Climate ==
Climate data for Ratchaburi (1993–2022)
Month	Jan	Feb	Mar	Apr	May	Jun	Jul	Aug	Sep	Oct	Nov	Dec	Year
Mean daily maximum °C (°F)	31.9 (89.4)	33.9 (93.0)	35.4 (95.7)	36.2 (97.2)	35.1 (95.2)	34.0 (93.2)	33.3 (91.9)	33.2 (91.8)	32.9 (91.2)	31.8 (89.2)	31.4 (88.5)	30.8 (87.4)	33.3 (92.0)
Daily mean °C (°F)	25.5 (77.9)	27.2 (81.0)	28.8 (83.8)	29.7 (85.5)	29.2 (84.6)	28.6 (83.5)	28.1 (82.6)	28.1 (82.6)	27.8 (82.0)	27.2 (81.0)	26.6 (79.9)	25.3 (77.5)	27.7 (81.8)
Mean daily minimum °C (°F)	20.6 (69.1)	22.1 (71.8)	23.9 (75.0)	25.1 (77.2)	25.7 (78.3)	25.4 (77.7)	25.0 (77.0)	25.0 (77.0)	24.9 (76.8)	24.6 (76.3)	23.4 (74.1)	21.2 (70.2)	23.9 (75.0)
Average precipitation mm (inches)	5.2 (0.20)	7.1 (0.28)	32.1 (1.26)	44.0 (1.73)	150.6 (5.93)	130.7 (5.15)	128.1 (5.04)	118.0 (4.65)	220.2 (8.67)	235.0 (9.25)	61.7 (2.43)	10.4 (0.41)	1,143.1 (45)
Average relative humidity (%)	72	73	74	74	79	80	81	81	83	86	81	74	78
Source: Soil Resources Survey and Research Division
