= October 2013 Myanmar bombings =

Series of bombings in Myanmar

- Part of Myanmar conflict
- October 2013 Myanmar bombings (Myanmar) Locations of the attacks
- Location: Myanmar (Burma)
- Date: October 2013 (GMT+6:30)
- Attack type: Bombing
- Deaths: 3
- Injuries: 10

The October 2013 Myanmar bombings were a string of unexplained bombings that killed three people and injured 10 others from 11 to 17 October 2013 in different parts of Myanmar (Burma). There is no strong evidence to blame a particular group, but these attacks were likely connected.

== Bombings ==
On 11 October, a bomb blast at a guesthouse in Taungoo Township, Bago Region, killed two people and injured one. Then on 13 October, a bomb exploded at a bus stop in Insein Township, Yangon. The blast damaged a bus stop and a billboard but no one was injured. Another homemade bomb attached to the underside of a truck exploded in Thaketa Township, Yangon when two youths tried to remove a clock attached to the device. The two youths were only slightly injured in the blast.

On 14 October, a small mine was found fixed under a table at a restaurant in Yangon and removed safely without being triggered. Another bomb was also found at a restaurant in Mandalay. Police removed the bomb and detonated it in a controlled explosion outside of the restaurant.

A small bomb in 14 October night ripped through a ninth story room at Traders Hotel, an upscale hotel in downtown Yangon that is popular among tourists and foreign business travellers. An American woman who was staying at the hotel with her family was injured in the blast, which took place in the bathroom of her hotel room. Small devices also exploded at a hotel and at a pagoda in Sagaing Region before dawn on 15 October..

On 17 October, two more explosions in Namkham, Shan State had killed one and wounded six was the last of bombings.

== Reactions and investigations ==
The police detained eight suspects following bomb blasts. A detainee reportedly served in the past in Karen National Union, a rebel group that signed a cease-fire with the government. The police identified one detained bombing suspect manages a mining project in Karen State. A group of Karen businessmen allegedly offered him a permit for a gold mine if he successfully planted bombs at hotels and restaurants.

The Karen National Union denied involvement in the bomb plots and agreed to help the government investigate the bomb blasts and search for more suspects.

Small bomb blasts occurred frequently under previous military regime, and were normally blamed on armed ethnic groups, although many believed the authorities were behind the explosions. These incidents had become rarer in recent years, and security had been heightened in anticipation of 2013 Southeast Asian Games.
