= Vigorous Burmese Student Warriors =

Militant group in Myanmar

- မြန်မာ ကျောင်းသား စစ်သည်တော်များ အဖွဲ့
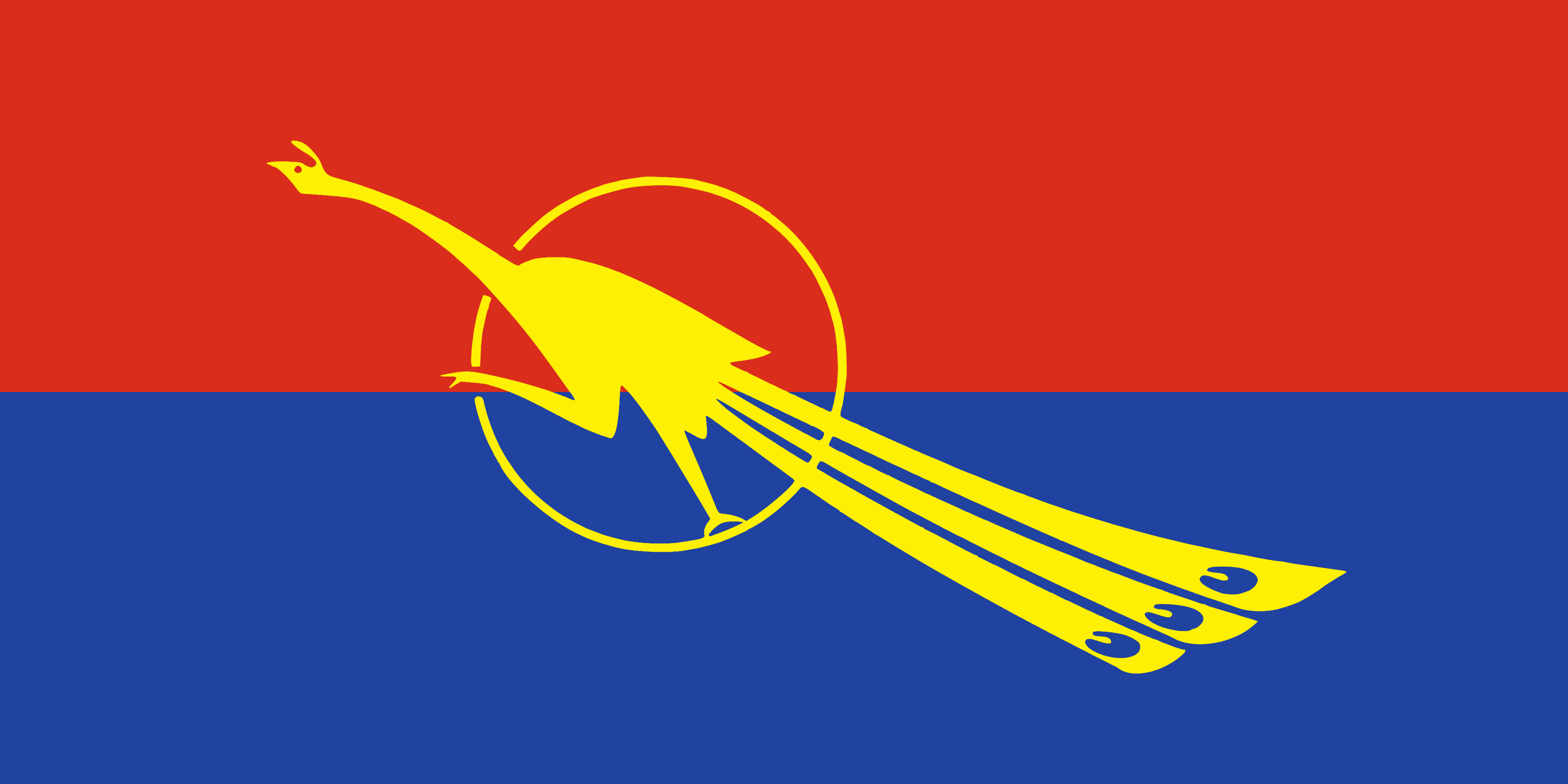
- Founded: August 1999
- Headquarters: Maneeloy refugee camp, Thailand
- Active regions: Myanmar–Thailand border
- Ideology: Anti–military junta

The Vigorous Burmese Student Warriors (VBSW) (Note: Burmese: မြန်မာ ကျောင်းသား စစ်သည်တော်များ အဖွဲ့, lit. 'Burmese Student Soldiers Association') was a militant group in Myanmar (Burma). It was established by former student participants in the 8888 Uprising against the government of Ne Win and the military (Tatmadaw). The Burmese government labeled, but did not formally designate, the group as a terrorist organisation after it gained notoriety by raiding and taking hostages at the Burmese embassy in Bangkok, Thailand, in October 1999.

== History ==
After the 1990 general election, which was unrecognised and suppressed by the newly formed military junta, many students that participated in the 8888 Uprising fled the country and went into hiding in neighbouring Thailand. In August 1999, the VBSW was formed as a militant opposition group, in contrast to groups such as the All Burma Students' Democratic Front, which originally sought the return of democracy through peaceful means.

On 1 October 1999, a group of five VBSW militants raided the Burmese embassy in the Thai capital Bangkok and took 89 people hostage. The group demanded that negotiations be opened between the National League for Democracy (NLD) – the leading pro-democracy organisation at the time – and the military junta, and that a new Pyidaungsu Hluttaw (national parliament) be convened based on the results of the 1990 election. However, the group soon relaxed their demands and began to release hostages, and the siege ended with the Thai government escorting the VBSW militants by helicopter to the Myanmar–Thailand border.

Despite openly supporting the democracy movement in Myanmar, contemporary figures of the movement such as Aung San Suu Kyi, the president of the NLD, denounced the VBSW and its use of violence to achieve its goals.
