= Timeline of Burmese history =

This is a timeline of Burmese or Myanmar history, comprising important legal and territorial changes and political events in Burma and its predecessor states. To read about the background to these events, see History of Burma. See also the list of Burmese leaders.

== Prehistory ==
Year	Date	Event
around 25,000 BP		Archaeological evidence of Homo sapiens in central Burma.
11,000 BCE		Archaeological evidence suggests that cultures existed in Burma as early as 11,000 BC.
1500s BCE		Earliest evidence of copper and bronze works, rice growing, domesticating chickens and pigs in Irrawaddy valley.

== 5th century BCE ==
Year	Date	Event
500 BCE		Iron-working settlements south of present-day Mandalay.

== 2nd century BCE ==
Year	Date	Event
180 BCE		Beikthano city fortified by Pyu people who had entered the Irrawaddy valley from north; beginning of Pyu city-states

== 1st century ==
Year	Date	Event
70		Pyu city of Halin in existence

== 2nd century ==
Year	Date	Event
200		The Pyu convert to Buddhism (to 400)

== 7th century ==
Year	Date	Event
7th century		Mon migrations to Lower Burma from Haribhunjaya and Dvaravati (present-day Thailand) (to 900)
640	21 March	The Pyu of Sri Ksetra Kingdom launch the Burmese calendar with the start date of 22 March 638. (Note: (Maha Yazawin Vol. 1 2006: 143): The calendar was reset in year 640 CE. The starting epochal date of the Burmese calendar was 22 March 638. Year 2 of the Burmese calendar began on 21 March 640 per (Eade 1989: 39).)

== 9th century ==
Year	Date	Event
820s – 832		Pyu city-states (like Hanlin) destroyed by Nanzhao raids
849	23 December	Pyinbya founds Pagan (Bagan)

== 10th century ==
Year	Date	Event
c. 980		Earliest evidence of Pagan walls
984		Earliest evidence of Burmese alphabet (according to an 18th-century recast stone inscription)

== 11th century ==
Year	Date	Event
1004		Pagan sends embassy to Song court at Bianjing
1035		Earliest evidence of Burmese alphabet (at the Mahabodhi Temple, India)
1044	11 August	Anawrahta ascends to Pagan throne
1050s		Anawrahta founds Pagan Kingdom including, Thaton, near Shan States, North Arakan, Malay Peninsula (to 1060)
1056		Anawrahta converted to Theravada Buddhism by Shin Arahan
1057	17 May	Pagan conquers Thaton Kingdom according to the Burmese chronicles
1071		Anawrahta helps restart Theravada Buddhism in Ceylon
1082–84		Rebellion in Lower Burma by Yamankan
1084	21 April	Kyansittha becomes king
1090		Kyansittha builds Ananda Temple

== 12th century ==
Year	Date	Event
1102		Earliest inscription of the word Mranma (Myanmar) in Mon script.
1106		Burmese embassy to Song China
1113		Myazedi inscription, earliest evidence of a more settled Burmese alphabet
1118		Pagan restores Letyaminnan to north Arakanese throne
1150 or 1151		Thatbyinnyu Temple by Alaungsithu is complete.
1170		Affirmation of Burman leadership of Pagan: Burmese becomes the primary written language, replacing Mon and Pyu
1174		Narapatisithu founds the Royal Burmese Armed Forces, the first known standing army in Burmese history
1180		Ceylonese raids to Bassein (Pathein)
1180		Schism develops in Burmese Buddhism; majority of monks shift to Mahavihara school
1190		The word Mranma first appears in Burmese
1200		Dhamaavisala Dhammathat code of law compiled

== 13th century ==
Year	Date	Event
1210		Kyaukse weir built
1211	18 August	Sithu II dies and Htilominlo succeeds
1218		Htilominlo builds Htilominlo Temple, the last of the great temples
1235	19 July	Kyaswa becomes king of Pagan
1256	6 May	Narathihapate placed on Pagan throne
1273		First mention of Mian (for Mranma) in Chinese
1277	April	The first Mongol invasion begins
1279	17 April	Thawun Gyi and Thawun Nge found Toungoo (Taungoo) as a frontier outpost
1283	22 September	Second Mongol campaign begins
1285	c. 11 January	Wareru seizes governorship of Martaban (Mottama)
1286	3 March	Pagan and Mongol commands sign ceasefire agreement
1286	June	Burmese embassy led by Shin Ditha Pamauk leaves for Beijing
1287	January	The Pagan Empire acknowledges suzerainty of the Mongol Empire
1287	30 January	Wareru declares independence and founds Kingdom of Ramanya
1287	1 July	King Narathihapate is assassinated
1289	30 May	Kyawswa becomes king of Pagan
1293		Wareru receives recognition as a vassal of Sukhothai
1296		Wareru and Tarabya decisively defeat a major Pagan invasion
1297	20 March	Kyawswa receives recognition by the Mongol Emperor as a Mongol vassal
1297	17 December	Kyawswa overthrown and Myinsaing Kingdom founded
1298	June/July	Ramanya receives recognition as a tributary of the Mongols
1299	8 May	Saw Hnit placed as Myinsaing's puppet king of Pagan

== 14th century ==
Year	Date	Event
1301	15 January	Last Mongol invasion begins
1301	6 April	Mongol forces retreat from Myinsaing
1303	4 April	Mongols evacuate Tagaung, retreat to Yunnan
1307	c. 14 January	Wareru is assassinated and Hkun Law succeeds the Martaban throne
1310	13 April	Athinkhaya dies
1311	10 April	Saw O becomes king of Martaban
1313	7 February	Thihathu founds Pinya Kingdom
1315	15 May	Sagaing secession begins
1316	26 March	Saw Yun's completes fortification of capital Sagaing
1323	by 28 September	Saw Zein become king of Martaban
1327	5 February	Tarabya I becomes king of Sagaing
1330		Martaban defeats Sukhothai; throws off nominal allegiance to Sukhothai
1340	1 September	Uzana I abdicates Pinya throne
1344	29 March	Kyawswa I becomes undisputed ruler of Pinya
1350	12 December	Kyawswa II becomes king of Pinya
1352	23 February	Thihapate becomes king of Sagaing
1356		Massive Shan raids into Upper Burma begin (to 1368)
1359	19 March	Kyawswa II dies and Narathu succeeds Pinya throne
1362		Binnya U raises the height of the Shwedagon Pagoda to 66 feet
1364	c. February	Byattaba seizes Martaban; Binnya U sets up camp at Donwun
1364	April	Maw forces sack Sagaing
1364	May	Maw forces sack Pinya
1364	September	Thado Minbya takes over Pinya
1365	26 February	Thado Minbya founds Ava Kingdom
1367	5 September	Swa Saw Ke becomes king of Ava
1369		Byattaba drives Binnya U out to Pegu (Bago)
1370		Shan state of Kale becomes tributary of Ava
1373		North Arakan asks for a Burmese regent
1383	by 28 October	Princess Maha Dewi becomes regent of Hanthawaddy Pegu
1384	4 January	Razadarit becomes king of Pegu
1385		Forty Years' War between Ava and Hanthawaddy Pegu begins
1389		Razadarit consolidates all three Mon-speaking regions in Lower Burma
1400	April	Tarabya becomes king of Ava
1400	25 November	Minkhaung I becomes king of Ava

== 15th century ==
Year	Date	Event
1406		Arakan vassal to Ava or Hanthawaddy Pegu (To Ava: 1406–1407, 1412–1413; To Pegu 1407–1412; 1413–1422/(1430?) (to 1430)
1406		Ava conquers Shan States of Mohnyin, Mogaung, Hsipaw
1415	13 March	Minye Kyawswa killed in action
1430	16 November	Min Saw Mon founds city of Mrauk-U
1437		Mrauk-U conquers Thandwe, unifying the entire Arakan coast for the first time
1459		Mrauk-U conquers Chittagong
1446		Chinese invade Upper Burma, demanding surrender of a runaway Shan chief. His dead body was given up. Chinese records say events occurred in 1448–1449
1450		Binnya Kyan increases the height of the Shwedagon Pagoda to 302 feet
1450		Rise of early Burmese vernacular literature
1480		Multiple rebellions by its vassals against Ava's rule. Prome, Yamethin and Mohnyin break away (to 1490)
1482		Thado Minsaw successfully breaks away from Ava, founds Prome Kingdom
1485		Mingyi Nyo becomes ruler of Toungoo; stays loyal to Ava

== 16th century ==
Year	Date	Event
1501	7 April	Narapati II becomes king of Ava
1502		Ava cedes Kyaukse to Toungoo to buy its loyalty, and cedes Shwebo District to Mohnyin
1510	16 October	Toungoo declares independence from Ava
1527	13 March	Confederation of Shan States conquers Ava, and installs Thohanbwa as vassal king
1530	24 November	Tabinshwehti becomes king of Toungoo
1534	c. November	Toungoo–Hanthawaddy War (1534–41) begins
1538	c. November	Toungoo forces capture Pegu; Toungoo–Ava War (1538–45) begins
1539	c. 31 March	Pegu made capital of Toungoo Kingdom
1541	May	Toungoo forces capture Martaban
1545	12 October	Toungoo forces invades Arakan
1547	30 January	Min Bin and Tabinshwehti agree to a truce
1547	November	First Burmese invasion of Siam begins
1549	February	Burmese and Siamese commands agree to a truce
1550	30 April	Tabinshwehti is assassinated
1551	11 January	Bayinnaung takes Toungoo
1555	22 January	Bayinnaung captures Ava, and annexes Upper Burma
1557	January–March	Bayinnaung annexes cis-Salween Shan States; abolishes animal sacrifice at Popa Hill and human sacrifice at Shan Hills
1558	2 April	Bayinnaung annexes Lan Na
1563	April	Bayinnaung captures farther Shan States (Kengtung and Chinese Shan states)
1564	18 February	The Ayutthaya Kingdom becomes Burmese vassal following the Burmese–Siamese War (1563–64)
1565	2 January	Burmese forces capture Vientiane, capital of Lan Xang
1568	12 May	Pegu learns of Siamese rebellion
1569	2 August	Burmese–Siamese War (1568–69) restores Burmese rule in Siam
1574	6 December	Burmese forces capture Vientiane
1581	10 October	Bayinnaung dies, and his eldest son Nanda succeeds
1584	3 May	Siam declares independence
1584–95		Repeated Burmese invasions fail to reconquer Siam. Siam regains Tenasserim coast up to Mawlamyaing
1597		All regions of the kingdom now in revolt
1599		Fall of First Toungoo Empire after Pegu sacked by the Arakanese and Toungoo (city) forces. Siam captures the entire Tenasserim coast to Martaban. Arakanese capture delta ports; appoint Portuguese mercenary de Brito governor of Syriam
1599		Siamese invasions take Martaban (1600) and Lan Na (1602) (to 1605)
1600		Nyaungyan restores central rule to Upper Burma and Shan States (to 1606)

== 17th century ==
Year	Date	Event
1603		De Brito at Syriam declares independence from Arakan, repels Arakanese attacks (to 1605)
1609		Portuguese mercenary Tibao captures Sandwip in East Bengal, northernmost Arakanese territory
1613	29 March	Anaukpetlun captures Portuguese Syriam
1614	December	Anaukpetlun recaptures the Tenasserim coast down to Tavoy, and all of Lan Na
1617		Min Khamaung recovers Sandwip. Beginning of Arakanese raids on Dakha
1619		English East India Company sends a representative to Pegu
1625		Arakanese sack Dakha
1627		English and Dutch East India companies open branches in Burma
1635		Capital moved to Ava from Pegu
1638		Thalun's revenue inquest
1660		Arakanese use coined currency
1658		Yongli Emperor of Ming China given refuge at Sagaing
1659–1661		Renegade Ming forces occupy near Shan states and attack Ava
1662	15 January	Surrender of the Yongli Emperor to Qing forces
1662		Siamese invasion of Lan Na and Tenasserim repelled (to 1664)
1666	January	Mogul Empire defeats Arakan and captures Chittagong Province
1677		English and Dutch East India companies close branches in Burma
1683		Dutch East India Company closes its branch in Arakan
1688		French East India Company opens a branch in Syriam

== 18th century ==
Year	Date	Event
1709		English open a branch in Syriam
1724		Meiteis raid Upper Burma (to 1749)
1727	October	Lan Na revolts; defeats Ava's attacks (1727–1728) and (1731–1732)
1735		China annexes northern Shan States (present-day Kachin State, northern Shan State, and trans-Salween Shan State)
1740	29 November	The Mon of Lower Burma break away, found Restored Hanthawaddy Kingdom
1740		Restored Hanthawaddy gradually pushes upcountry and captures Ava, ending the Tougnoo dynasty. The Siamese move up their control up the Tenasserim coast, taking Tavoy and then Martaban by 1751 (to March 1752)
1752	29 February	Alaungpaya founds the Konbaung dynasty
1752	23 March	Toungoo dynasty falls
1752	20 April	Konbaung-Hanthawaddy War begins
1753	26 April	English seize Negrais
1755	5 May	Alaungpaya captures Dagon, having conquered the Irrawaddy delta in April
1756	25 July	Alaungpaya captures French-defended Syriam.
1756		Alaungpaya sends a punitive expedition to Manipur
1757	6 May	Pegu captured; end of Restored Hanthawaddy
1758	November	Konbaung armies overrun Manipur, reassert Burmese authority in northern Shan States which had been annexed by the Chinese in the 1730s (to 1759)
1759	6 October	English driven out at Negrais
1760	May	Burmese invasion of Siam falls short; regains the Tenasserim coast to Tavoy
1763	January	Lanna rebellion put down
1765	January–March	Burmese armies capture Laotian states of Luang Prabang and Vientiane
1765	March	Hsinbyushin puts down a rebellion in Manipur
1765	23 July	Capital moved to Ava
1765	23 August	Start of Burmese–Siamese War (1765–67)
1765	December	Start of Chinese invasions (1765–69) of Burma
1767	7 April	Burmese armies sack Ayutthaya; end of Ayutthaya Kingdom
1768	January–March	Burmese armies withdrawn from Siam and redeployed to the Chinese front. Burmese defenses against the Chinese invasions held. Siam recaptures all of its territories (except Tenasserim) (to 1770)
1769	22 December	End of Sino-Burmese War
1770	January	Rebellion in Manipur put down
1775	15 January	Lan Na (Chiang Mai) revolts, seeks and receives Siamese help.
1775	April	Hsinbyushin raises the Shwedagon Pagoda to its present height
1775	November	Another Burmese invasion of Siam fails; Southern Lan Na becomes Siamese vassal (to 1776)
1778	December	Laotian states (Luang Prabang and Vientiane) stop paying tribute, switch sides to Siam
1783	13 May	Capital moved to Amarapura
1785	2 January	Konbaung armies capture Mrauk U, ending five centuries of Arakanese independence
1785		Bodawpaya's invasion of Siam fails; Lan Na now firmly in Siamese camp (to 1786)
1787		Defeats Siamese invasion of Tenasserim
1790		Resumes diplomatic relationship with China
1792		Defeats another Siamese invasion of Tenasserim
1797		Burmese invasion of Lan Na and Luang Prabang fails

== 19th century ==
Year	Date	Event
1802		Ceylonese monks seek ordination at Amarapura
1803		Siamese invasion of Kengtung fails (to 1804)
1809		Burmese invasion of Junkceylon (Phuket) fails (to 1812)
1814	February	Burma annexes Manipur
1817		Assam becomes tributary to Burma
1819		Burmese put down rebellions in Assam and Manipur
1822	3 June	Burmese put down another rebellion in Assam, and make it a Burmese province
1824	5 March	Start of First Anglo-Burmese War
1826	24 February	End of First Anglo-Burmese War; Burma cedes Arakan, Assam, Manipur and Tenasserim
1849		Defeats Siamese invasion of Kengtung (to 1855)
1852		Second Anglo-Burmese War; British seize Lower Burma
1853		British expand Rangoon (modern-day downtown Yangon)
1859	23 May	Mindon moves capital to newly founded city of Mandalay
1866		Head of reform movement, Crown Prince Kanaung is assassinated.
1871		Fifth Buddhist council convenes
1875	March	Mindon cedes Karenni States to the British to avoid annexation
1878		Rangoon College founded
1885	29 November	Third Anglo-Burmese War; end of Burmese monarchy
1886		British "pacification" of Burma (to 1896)
1886	1 January	Burma is proclaimed a British colony. February: Burma is proclaimed a province of British India

== 20th century ==
Year	Date	Event
1920		First Rangoon University strike
1921		The Dyarchy reforms begin
1930		Nationalist and leftist Dobama Asiayone founded
1930		Peasants' rebellion (to 1932)
1936		Second Rangoon University strike
1937		Burma is separated from British India and becomes a separate colony
1938		Third Rangoon University strike and nationwide strikes
1941		Burma Independence Army formed with Japanese help
1942		Japanese occupation of Burma. Thai occupation of Kengtung (to 1945)
1945		Return of British rule
1947	12 February	Panglong Agreement signed by Shan, Kachin, Chin and Burman leaders to gain independence from the British
1947	19 July	Aung San and most of his cabinet assassinated. U Nu and his AFPFL party prepare to take power from the British by finishing Burma's first constitution
1947	24 September	1947 Constitution guarantees the Federated Shan States (later Shan and Kayah states), Kachin State, and Karen State, the right to secede after a period of ten years after independence
1948	4 January	Burma gains independence from the United Kingdom with U Nu as Prime Minister
1949		Insurgencies begin
1950		Burmese Army repels Nationalist Chinese invasion of Shan State (to 1961)
1958		Caretaker government, led by army Chief of Staff General Ne Win, formed following a split in the ruling AFPFL party. (Caretaker Gov. rule until 1960)
1960		U Nu's party faction wins decisive victory in 1960 elections, but his promotion of Buddhism as the state religion and his tolerance of separatism angers the military.
1961		U Thant becomes 3rd Secretary-General of the United Nations. Yangon hosts Second Southeast Asian Peninsular Games
1962	2 March	Democratically elected government of U Nu is overthrown by Ne Win, who abolishes the federal system and inaugurates "the Burmese Way to Socialism" – nationalising the economy, forming a single-party state with the BSPP as the sole political party, and banning independent newspapers
1962	7 July	Government guns down student protesters
1969		Yangon hosts Fifth Southeast Asian Peninsular Games
1974		Ne Win proclaims a new constitution. Chin Special Division becomes Chin State; Mon State is created out of Tenasserim Division. Government guns down student protesters following U Thant's death
1985		Repeated demonetization of higher denomination kyat notes; Intensification of economic hardship on general populace (to 1987)
1988		Nationwide uprising brings down Ne Win's government. Military crushes protests, forms a ruling junta, promises elections
1989		Junta changes the English spellings of geographic names, including the country's name (to Myanmar)
1990		National League for Democracy wins 82% of the seats in the general election. Junta refuses to hand over power, jails NLD leader Aung San Suu Kyi
1990		Western nations and Japan begin economic sanctions against Myanmar
1991		Aung San Suu Kyi is awarded the Nobel Peace Prize
1997		Myanmar is admitted to ASEAN

== 21st century ==
Year	Date	Event
2003	February	A major bank run in private banking occurs
2005	7 May	Bombings kill 11 people and injured 162
2005	6 November	Junta moves the capital to Naypyidaw
2007		Junta suppresses anti-government protests, killing scores of protesters, including Buddhist monks
2008		2008 Constitution reserves 25% of the seats in a bicameral Hluttaw to the military.
2008	2 May	Cyclone Nargis kills nearly 140,000 people and devastates the Irrawaddy delta
2009	27–30 August	1st Kokang incident occurs
2010	15 April	Bombings kill 10 people and injured 178
2010	21 October	Government changes country's flag and its official name is adopted as "Republic of the Union of Myanmar"
2010	November	The 2010 general election gives the victory to military-backed USDP
2010	November	Aung San Suu Kyi is released from house arrest
2011	31 January	The first session of Pyidaungsu Hluttaw (parliament) convenes
2011	24 March	An earthquake occurs in Shan State
2011	30 March	Thein Sein becomes President of Burma
2011		Reforms in Burma begins
2012		Economic sanctions imposed by the European Union and the United States are eased
2012	13 January	Prominent political prisoners including Min Ko Naing are released
2012	1 April	National League for Democracy wins in by-elections
2012	2 May	Aung San Suu Kyi becomes a lawmaker
2012	June–October	Rakhine State riots occurs
2012	9 November	A train crash kills at least 27 people and injured 80
2012	November	Government suppresses copper mine protests
2013	March–October	Tensions between Buddhist and Muslim flare into violent clashes in various cities
2013	11–17 October	Bombings kill 3 people and injured 10
2013	11–22 December	27th Southeast Asian Games takes place
2014	14–20 January	7th ASEAN Para Games takes place
2014	March–April	A nationwide census takes place (Total population 51,486,253)
2014	12–13 November	Ninth East Asia Summit takes place
2015	February–June	2nd Kokang incident occurs
2015	March	Government suppresses education law protests
2015	July–September	Severe flooding occur
2015	10 November	The 2015 general election gives the victory to NLD
2015	22 November	A major landslide kills at least 116 people
2016	1 February	The second session of Pyithu Hluttaw (lower house) convenes
2016	3 February	The second session of Amyotha Hluttaw (upper house) convenes
2016	8 February	The second session of Assembly of the Union (Union Parliament) convenes
2016	8 February	The second session of State and Region Hluttaws (regional parliaments) convenes
2016	30 March	Htin Kyaw becomes President of Myanmar
2016	6 April	Aung San Suu Kyi becomes State Counsellor of Myanmar (de facto prime minister)
2025	28 March	A 7.7-magnitude earthquake in central Myanmar. Over 140 people died and 730 were injured in Myanmar.

== See also ==
- History of Myanmar
- List of Burmese monarchs
- Family tree of Burmese monarchs

== Bibliography ==
- Aung-Thwin, Michael (2005). The mists of Rāmañña: The Legend that was Lower Burma (illustrated ed.). Honolulu: University of Hawai'i Press. ISBN 9780824828868.
- Charney, Michael W. (2006). Powerful Learning: Buddhist Literati and the Throne in Burma's Last Dynasty, 1752–1885. Ann Arbor: University of Michigan.
- Hall, D.G.E. (1960). Burma (3rd ed.). Hutchinson University Library. ISBN 978-1-4067-3503-1.
- Harvey, G. E. (1925). History of Burma: From the Earliest Times to 10 March 1824. London: Frank Cass & Co. Ltd.
- Htin Aung, Maung (1967). A History of Burma. New York and London: Cambridge University Press.
- Kala, U (1720). Maha Yazawin Gyi (in Burmese). Vol. 1–3 (2006, 4th printing ed.). Yangon: Ya-Pyei Publishing.
- Kyaw Thet (1962). History of Burma (in Burmese). Yangon: Yangon University Press.
- Myat Soe, ed. (1964). Myanma Swezon Kyan (in Burmese). Vol. 9 (1 ed.). Yangon: Sarpay Beikman.
- Myint-U, Thant (2006). The River of Lost Footsteps—Histories of Burma. Farrar, Straus and Giroux. ISBN 978-0-374-16342-6.
- Pan Hla, Nai (1968). Razadarit Ayedawbon (in Burmese) (8th printing, 2004 ed.). Yangon: Armanthit Sarpay.
- Royal Historical Commission of Burma (1832). Hmannan Yazawin (in Burmese). Vol. 1–3 (2003 ed.). Yangon: Ministry of Information, Myanmar.
- Than Tun (December 1959). "History of Burma: A.D. 1300–1400". Journal of Burma Research Society. XLII (II).
