= Buddhist calendar =

Lunisolar calendars from Southeast Asia

Translations of Buddhist calendar
- English: Calendar of the Lord Buddha
- Sanskrit: बौद्धपञ्चाङ्ग (IAST: Bauddhapañcāṅga)
- Pali: Sāsanā Sakaraj
- Bengali: বৌদ্ধ পঞ্জিকা (Bauddha pañjikā)
- Burmese: သာသနာတော်နှစ် (MLCTS: θàðənà θɛʔkəɹɪʔ)
- Chinese: 佛历 / 佛曆 (Pinyin: Fó Lì)
- Indonesian: Kalender Buddha
- Japanese: 仏滅紀元 (Rōmaji: Butsumetsu Kigen)
- Khmer: ពុទ្ធសករាជ (UNGEGN: Pŭtthôsâkâréach; ALA-LC: Buddhasakarāj)
- Korean: 불멸기원 佛滅紀元 (RR: Bulmyeolgiwon)
- Lao: ພຸດທະສັກກະຣາດ (Phuthasakkarad)
- Sinhala: බුද්ධ වර්‍ෂ / සාසන වර්‍ෂ (Buddha Varṣa / Sāsana Varṣa)
- Tamil: புத்த நாட்காட்டி (Putta Nāṭkāṭṭi)
- Thai: พุทธศักราช (RTGS: Phutthasakkarat)
- Vietnamese: Phật Lịch

The Buddhist calendar is a set of lunisolar calendars primarily used in Tibet, Cambodia, Laos, Myanmar, Bangladesh, India, Sri Lanka, Thailand and Vietnam as well as in Malaysia and Singapore and by Chinese populations for religious or official occasions. While the calendars share a common lineage, they also have minor but important variations such as intercalation schedules, month names and numbering, use of cycles, etc. In Thailand, the name Buddhist Era is a year numbering system shared by the traditional Thai lunar calendar and by the Thai solar calendar.

The Southeast Asian lunisolar calendars are largely based on an older version of the Hindu calendar, which uses the sidereal year as the solar year. One major difference is that the Southeast Asian systems, unlike their Indian cousins, do not use apparent reckoning to stay in sync with the sidereal year. Instead, they employ their versions of the Metonic cycle. However, since the Metonic cycle is not very accurate for sidereal years, the Southeast Asian calendar is slowly drifting out of sync with the sidereal, approximately one day every 100 years. Yet no coordinated structural reforms of the lunisolar calendar have been undertaken.

Today, the traditional Buddhist lunisolar calendar is used mainly for Theravada Buddhist festivals. The Thai Buddhist Era, a renumbered Gregorian calendar, is the official calendar in Thailand.

== Structure ==
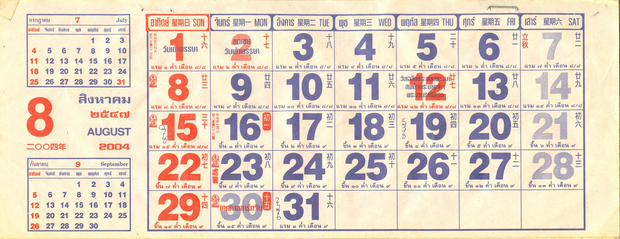
Thailand's version of the lunisolar Buddhist calendar

The calculation methodology of the current versions of Southeast Asian Buddhist calendars is largely based on that of the Burmese calendar, which was in use in various Southeast Asian kingdoms down to the 19th century under the names of Chula Sakarat and Jolak Sakaraj. The Burmese calendar in turn was based on the "original" Surya Siddhanta system of ancient India (believed to be Ardharatrika school). One key difference with Indian systems is that the Burmese system has followed a variation of the Metonic cycle. It is unclear from where, when or how the Metonic system was introduced; hypotheses range from China to Europe. (Note: (Ohashi 2001: 398–399): Astronomers of ancient India certainly knew of the Metonic cycle, and may have introduced the concept to Southeast Asia. However, the Metonic cycle, which employs tropical years, is incompatible with sidereal based Hindu calendars, and thus was not (and still is not) used in Hindu calendars. Chatterjee (1998: 151) suggests that the Metonic system was introduced to Burma by Europeans. Ohashi (2001: 398–399) rejects Chatterjee's hypothesis saying that "no other trace of European influence is found in South-East Asian astronomy." Instead, Ohashi (2001: 401–403) suggests that China may have been the source of the Metonic cycle.) The Burmese system, and indeed the Southeast Asian systems, thus use a "strange" combination of sidereal years from the Indian calendar in combination with the Metonic cycle better for tropical years.

=== Epoch ===
Sri Lankan Theravada tradition starts Buddha Varsa on 16 April 545 BCE. In all Theravada traditions, the calendar's epoch (foundational moment) was the day in which the Buddha attained parinibbāna. However, not all traditions agree on when it actually took place. In Burmese Buddhist tradition, it was 13 May 544 BCE (Tuesday, Full moon of Kason 148 Anjanasakaraj). In Thai Buddhist tradition, it was 11 March 544 BCE (–543), the date which the current Thai lunisolar and solar calendars use as their epochal date. Yet, the Thai calendars for some reason have fixed the difference between their Buddhist Era (BE) numbering and the Common Era (CE) numbering at exactly 543 years. In Myanmar, the difference between BE and CE can be 543 or 542 for CE dates, and 542 or 541 for BCE dates, depending on the month of the Buddhist Era (as the Buddhist calendar straddles the Gregorian calendar — during the entire period from 1739 to 2000 CE, this is from April to April). (The Tibetan calendar (Phugpa system) counts years from the arrival of the Kālacakra Tantra in Tibet (1027 CE), resulting in a much lower year number than the Theravada BE.)

As of 2026, the Buddhist new year begins on 21 May 2026 everywhere except Thailand and Tibet. It begins on 1 January 2026 in Thailand and on 18 February 2026 in Tibet (when the new year will become 2153).

BE year	Equivalent CE years	Equivalent CE years (Thai solar)
0	544–543 BC	544–543 BC
1	543–542 BC	543–542 BC
543	1 BC – 1 AD	1 BC – 1 AD
544	1–2 AD	1–2 AD
2483	1940–1941	1940 (Apr–Dec)
2484	1941–1942	1941
2569	2025–2026	2026

=== Month ===
==== Types ====
The calendar recognizes two types of months: synodic month and sidereal month. The Synodic months are used to compose the years while the 27 lunar sidereal days (Sanskrit: nakshatra), alongside the 12 signs of the zodiac, are used for astrological calculations. (The Burmese calendar also recognizes a solar month called Thuriya Matha, which is defined as 1/12th of a year. But the solar month varies by the type of year such as tropical year, sidereal year, etc.)

==== Waxing and waning ====
The days of the month are counted in two halves, waxing and waning. The 15th of the waxing is the civil full moon day. The civil new moon day is the last day of the month (14th or 15th waning). Because of the inaccuracy of the calendrical calculation systems, the mean and real (true) New Moons rarely coincide. The mean New Moon often precedes the real New Moon.

Type	Days	Description
Waxing	1 to 15	from New Moon to Full Moon
Full Moon	15	Full Moon
Waning	1 to 14 or 15	from Full Moon to New Moon
New Moon	15	New Moon

==== Number of days per month ====
As the Synodic lunar month is approximately 29.5 days, the calendar uses alternating months of 29 and 30 days.

Pali	Sanskrit	Burmese	Khmer	Lao	Sinhala	Thai	No. of days	Gregorian (approx.)
Citta	Caitra	Tagu (တန်ခူး)	Cheit (ចេត្រ)	ຈິຕ	Bak (බක්)	Chit (จิตร)	29	March–April
Vesākha	Vaiśākha	Kason (ကဆုန်)	Pisak (ពិសាខ)	ວິສາຂະ	Vesak (වෙසක්)	Wisakha (วิสาข)	30	April–May
Jeṭṭha	Jyaiṣṭha	Nayon (နယုန်)	Chesth (ជេស្ឋ)	ເຊດ	Poson (පොසොන්)	Shet/Chet (เชษฐ)	29 [30]	May–June
Āsāḷha	Āṣāḍha	Waso (ဝါဆို)	Asart (អាសាឍ)	ອາສາລະຫະ	Æsala (ඇසළ)	Asanha (อาสาฬห)	30	June–July
Sāvaṇa	Śrāvaṇa	Wagaung (ဝါခေါင်)	Srap (ស្រាពណ៍)	ສາວະນະ	Nikini (නිකිණි)	Sawon (สาวน)	29	July–August
Poṭṭhapāda	Bhādrapada or Proṣṭhapāda	Tawthalin (တော်သလင်း)	Phutrabot (ភទ្របទ)	ພັດທະຣະບົດ	Binara (බිනර)	Phatharabot (ภัทรบท)	30	August–September
Assayuja	Āśvina	Thadingyut (သီတင်းကျွတ်)	Asoch (អស្សុជ)	ອັດສະວະຍຸດ	Wap (වප්)	Atsawayut (อัศวยุช)	29	September–October
Kattika	Kārtika	Tazaungmon (တန်ဆောင်မုန်း)	Kadoek (កត្តិក)	ກັດຕິກາ	Il (ඉල්)	Kattika (กัตติกา)	30	October–November
Māgasira	Mārgaśirṣa	Nadaw (နတ်တော်)	Mikkasé (មិគសិរ)	ມິຄະສິນ	Undhuvap (උඳුවප්)	Mikkhasinra (มิคสิร)	29	November–December
Phussa	Pauṣa	Pyatho (ပြာသို)	Bos (បុស្ស)	ປຸສສ	Dhuruthu (දුරුතු)	Putsa (ปุสสะ)	30	December–January
Māgha	Māgha	Tabodwe (တပို့တွဲ)	Meak (មាឃ)	ມາດ	Navam (නවම්)	Makha (มาฆ)	29	January–February
Phagguṇa	Phālguna	Tabaung (တပေါင်း)	Phalkun (ផល្គុន)	ຜັກຄຸນ	Mædhin (මැදින්)	Phakkhun (ผัคคุณ)	30	February–March

==== Month numbering ====
Various regional versions of Chula Sakarat/Burmese calendar existed across various regions of mainland Southeast Asia. Unlike Burmese systems, Kengtung, Sipsongpanna, Lan Na, Lan Xang and Sukhothai systems refer to the months by numbers, not by names. This means reading ancient texts and inscriptions in Thailand requires constant vigilance, not just in making sure one is correctly operating for the correct region, but also for variations within regions itself when incursions cause a variation in practice.

Month	Khmer, Lan Xang, Sukhothai and Old Burmese	Kengtung, Sipsongpanna	Chiang Mai
Citta	5	6	7
Vesākha	6	7	8
Jeṭṭha	7	8	9
Āsāḷha	8	9	10
Sāvaṇa	9	10	11
Poṭṭhapāda	10	11	12
Assayuja	11	12	1
Kattika	12	1	2
Māgasira	1	2	3
Phussa	2	3	4
Māgha	3	4	5
Phagguṇa	4	5	6

=== Year ===
The Buddhist calendar is a lunisolar calendar in which the months are based on lunar months and years are based on solar years. One of its primary objectives is to synchronize the lunar part with the solar part. The lunar months, normally twelve of them, consist alternately of 29 days and 30 days, such that a normal lunar year will contain 354 days, as opposed to the solar year of ~365.25 days. Therefore, some form of addition to the lunar year (of intercalation) is necessary. The overall basis for it is provided by cycles of 57 years. Eleven extra days are inserted in every 57 years, and seven extra months of 30 days are inserted in every 19 years (21 months in 57 years). This provides 20819 complete days to both calendars. This 57-year cycle would provide a mean year of about 365.2456 days and a mean month of about 29.530496 days, if not corrected.

As such, the calendar adds an intercalary month in leap years and sometimes also an intercalary day in great leap years. The intercalary month not only corrects the length of the year but also corrects the accumulating error of the month to extent of half a day. The average length of the month is further corrected by adding a day to Nayon at irregular intervals—a little more than seven times in two cycles (39 years). The intercalary day is never inserted except in a year which has an intercalary month. The Hindu calendar inserts an intercalary month at any time of year as soon as the accumulated fractions amount to one month. The Burmese calendar however always inserts the intercalary month at the same time of the year, after the summer solstice while the Arakanese calendar inserts it after the vernal equinox.

==== Burmese ====
The Burmese calendar year consists of 354, 384 or 385 days.

Month	Regular year	Small leap year	Big leap year
Tagu	29	29	29
Kason	30	30	30
Nayon	29	29	30
Waso	30	30	30
2nd Waso	n/a	30	30
Wagaung	29	29	29
Tawthalin	30	30	30
Thadingyut	29	29	29
Tazaungmon	30	30	30
Nadaw	29	29	29
Pyatho	30	30	30
Tabodwe	29	29	29
Tabaung	30	30	30
Total	354	384	385

Note: The Arakanese calendar adds the intercalary day in Tagu, not in Nayon.

==== Cambodian, Lao and Thai ====
The Cambodian, Lao and Thai lunisolar calendars use a slightly different method to place the intercalary day. Instead of it in a leap year as in the Burmese system, the Thai system places it in a separate year. Thus, the Thai small leap year has 355 days while the Thai great leap year has 384 days.

Month	Regular year	Small leap year	Big leap year
Citta	29	29	29
Vesākha	30	30	30
Jeṭṭha	29	30	29
Āsāḷha	30	30	30
2nd Āsāḷha	n/a	n/a	30
Sāvaṇa	29	29	29
Poṭṭhapāda	30	30	30
Assayuja	29	29	29
Kattika	30	30	30
Māgasira	29	29	29
Phussa	30	30	30
Māgha	29	29	29
Phagguṇa	30	30	30
Total	354	355	384

=== New Year's Day ===
Since the main purpose of Buddhist calendar is to keep pace with the solar year, the new year is always marked by the solar year, which falls at the time when the Sun enters Aries. The date, which at the present falls on the 17th of April, has slowly drifted over the centuries. In the 20th century, the New Year's Day fell on April 15 or 16th but in the 17th century, it fell on April 9 or 10th. Thailand and Cambodia no longer use the traditional lunisolar calendar to mark the New Year's Day.

Tradition	Date in 2013	Notes
Burmese/Sinhalese	17 April	Varies; will keep on drifting away
Khmer	14 April	Varies from 13th to 14 April
Thai	13 April	Fixed to the solar calendar

=== Cycle ===
The Cambodian, Lao and Thai systems give animal names to the years from a cycle of 12. The practice also existed in Burma in the Pagan period but later died out.

Year	Animal	Khmer	Lao	Thai
1	Rat	ជូត (Chout)	ຊວດ (Suat)	ชวด (Chuat)
2	Ox	ឆ្លូវ (Chlov)	ສະຫລູ (Salu)	ฉลู (Chalu)
3	Tiger	ខាល (Khal)	ຂານ (Khan)	ขาล (Khan)
4	Rabbit	ថោះ (Thos)	ເຖາະ (Tho)	เถาะ (Tho)
5	Naga	រោង (Rorng)	ມະໂລງ (Malong)	มะโรง (Marong)
6	Snake	ម្សាញ់ (Msanh)	ມະເສງ (Maseng)	มะเส็ง (Maseng)
7	Horse	មមី (Momee)	ມະເມັຽ (Mamia)	มะเมีย (Mamia)
8	Goat	មមែ (Momae)	ມະແມ (Mamae)	มะแม (Mamae)
9	Monkey	វក (Vohk)	ວອກ (Wok)	วอก (Wok)
10	Rooster	រកា (Roka)	ລະກາ (Laka)	ระกา (Raka)
11	Dog	ច (Chor)	ຈໍ (Cho)	จอ (Cho)
12	Pig	កុរ (Kol)	ກຸນ (Kun)	กุน (Kun)

The Cambodian calendar also maintains a 10-year naming cycle (numbered one to ten). Cambodians use multiple systems to identify a given year. For instance, 2017 is identified as 2561 Buddhist Era, the year of Rooster, Nuppasak (Year 9). The Thai lunar calendar also uses a similar numbered 10-year cycle. Each number in the cycle corresponds to the last digit of the year in the Chula Sakarat calendar.

Numbers	Names in Khmer	Khmer transliteration	Names in Thai	Thai transliteration
1	ឯកស័ក	Aekkasak	เอกศก	Ekkasok
2	ទោស័ក	Tohsak	โทศก	Thosok
3	ត្រីស័ក	Treisak	ตรีศก	Trisok
4	ចត្វាស័ក	Chattvasak	จัตวาศก	Chattawasok
5	បញ្ចស័ក	Panchasak	เบญจศก	Benchasok
6	ឆស័ក	Chhorsak	ฉศก	Chorsok
7	សប្តស័ក	Sappdasak	สัปตศก	Saptasok
8	អដ្ឋស័ក	Atthasak	อัฐศก	Atthasok
9	នព្វស័ក	Nuppasak	นพศก	Nopphasok
10	សំរឹទ្ធិស័ក	Samroetthisak	สัมฤทธิศก	Samritthisok

== Accuracy ==
The Southeast Asian Buddhist calendars use lunar months but try to keep pace with the solar year, by inserting intercalary months and days on the Metonic cycle (in the case of the Burmese calendar, on a modified Metonic cycle). However, the solar year as defined by the Buddhist calendars is really a sidereal year, which is nearly 24 minutes longer than the actual mean tropical year. Therefore, like all sidereal-based calendars, the lunisolar calendars are slowly drifting away from the seasons. The calendars are drifting one day approximately every 60 years and 4 months.

The accumulating drift against the seasons means the New Year's Day which used to fall on 22 March (near the vernal equinox) in 638 CE now falls on 17 April in 2013 CE. There is no known internationally concerted effort to stop this drift. Thailand has moved its "Buddhist Era" to the Gregorian calendar under the name of Thai solar calendar. In Myanmar, Burmese calendarists have tried to deal with the issue by periodically modifying the intercalation schedule in the Metonic cycle. One major downside of this approach is that it is not possible to publish future calendars more than a few years (often even a year) ahead. (Note: (Irwin 1909: 26–27): In the mid-19th century, the Burmese Konbaung Dynasty tried to address the issue by introducing a new calculation methodology. However, the new solar year it chose was actually 0.56 second a year less accurate than the version still prevalent in the rest of Southeast Asia. The Konbaung court also modified the Metonic cycle, which did more to re-synchronize the calendar with the seasons than the less accurate solar year.)

== History ==
The Buddhist Era was first introduced to Southeast Asia along with Buddhism in the early centuries CE. It was not a separate calendar but simply a year numbering system that employed the organization and calculation methods of the prevailing lunisolar calendars in use throughout the region. In the early centuries CE, the reference civil calendar of the Buddhist calendar prevalent in Southeast Asia was the Saka Era (Mahāsakaraj Era), which is said to have been adopted by the Pyu state of Sri Ksetra in 80 CE. The Saka Era was gradually replaced by the Burmese Era or Culāsakaraj, first in Myanmar in 640 CE, and in other Theravada kingdoms of Southeast Asia between the 13th and 16th centuries. The earliest use of the Burmese calendar in lands part of present-day Thailand dates to the mid-13th century. Ayutthaya adopted the Burmese calendar in the 16th century. Theravada Buddhist tradition also recognizes pre-Buddhist Anjana Sakaraj (Añjana's Era) since the events of the Buddha's life are recorded in that era.

Name	Epochal date	Notes
Anjana Sakaraj	10 March 691 BCE	Said to have been started by the Buddha's maternal grandfather King Añjana; Used to date the events during the Buddha's lifetime
Buddhist Era	13 May 544 BCE; 16 April 545 BCE	544 BCE in Myanmar; 545 BCE in Thailand
Śaka Era	17 March 78 CE	Civil calendar
Burmese Era (Culāsakaraj)	22 March 638	Civil calendar

The tradition of using different reference calendars continued in Siam in 1912 when King Vajiravudh decreed that the Buddhist Era would now track the Thai solar calendar, the Siamese version of the Gregorian calendar with the New Year's Day of 1 April. Therefore, the Thai Buddhist Era year of 2455 began on 1 April 1912 (as opposed to 15 April 1912 according to the lunisolar calendar). The Thai Buddhist Era was further realigned to the Gregorian calendar on 6 September 1940 when Prime Minister Phibunsongkhram decreed 1 January 1941 as the start of the year 2484 BE. As a result, the Year 2483 was only 9 months long, and the Thai Buddhist Era equals that of the Common Era plus 543 years.

== Current usage ==
The lunisolar calendar is used to mark important Buddhist holidays. Many of the holidays are celebrated as public holidays.

Buddhist calendar date	International date	Public holiday in	Notes
Full moon of Phussa	January	Sri Lanka	Duruthu Poya: Commemorates the first visit of the Buddha to Lanka from Dambadiva.
Full moon of Māgha	February	Cambodia, Laos, Sri Lanka, Thailand	Magha Puja in Cambodia, Laos, Thailand and known as Navam Poya in Sri Lanka
Full moon of Phagguṇa	March	Laos, Myanmar, Sri Lanka	Boun Pha Vet (Laos), Tabaung Festival (Myanmar), Medin Poya (Sri Lanka)
Almost always in Citta, sometimes in Vesākha	13–17 April (varies by country)	Cambodia, Laos, Myanmar, Sri Lanka, Thailand	Songkran (Southeast Asian New Year); Traditionally, the New Year's Day is marked when the Sun enters Aries but the day is now fixed in most countries; Myanmar still follows the tradition. It also marks the beginning of the next Buddhist calendar animal zodiac year for certain countries.
Full moon of Citta	April	Sri Lanka	Bak Poya: Commemorates the second visit of the Buddha to Sri Lanka
Full moon of Vesākha	May	Cambodia, Laos, Thailand, Sri Lanka, Myanmar, Malaysia, Singapore	Buddha Day (Vesak)
Full moon of Jeṭṭha	June	Sri Lanka	Poson Poya: Commemorates introduction of Buddhism to Sri Lanka
Full moon of Āsāḷha	July	Cambodia, Laos, Myanmar, Thailand, Sri Lanka	Vassa; Esala Poya (Sri Lanka); Asalha Puja (Thailand)
Full moon of Sāvaṇa	August	Sri Lanka	Nikini Poya
Full moon of Poṭṭhapāda	September	Laos, Sri Lanka	Binara Poya (Sri Lanka)
Full moon of Assayuja	October	Cambodia, Laos, Myanmar, Sri Lanka	End of Vassa; Boun Suang Huea (Laos); Thadingyut Festival (Myanmar); Vap Poya (Sri Lanka); Wan Ok Phansa (Thailand)
Full moon of Kattika	November	Laos, Myanmar, Sri Lanka, Thailand, Cambodia	That Luang Festival (Laos); Tazaungdaing Festival (Myanmar); Il Poya (Sri Lanka); Loi Krathong (Thailand); Bon Om Touk (Cambodia)
Full moon of Māgasira	December	Sri Lanka	Undhuvap Poya (Sri Lanka)

== Computer support ==
The Thai-style "Buddhist calendar", which is the Gregorian calendar with the Buddhist era, is supported in Java 8, iOS, Microsoft Windows, and macOS.

== See also ==
- Burmese calendar
- Chinese calendar
- Hindu calendar
- Horology – Art or science of measuring time
- Index of Buddhism-related articles
- Lunar calendar – Calendar based only on the Moon
- Mongolian calendar
- Thai lunar calendar
- Thai solar calendar
- Tibetan calendar

== Bibliography ==
- Busyakul, Visudh (April–June 2004). ปฏิทินและศักราชที่ใช้ในประเทศไทย [Calendar and era in use in Thailand] (PDF). Journal of the Royal Institute of Thailand (in Thai and English). 29 (2): 468–478. Archived from the original (PDF) on 2014-01-16.
- Chatterjee, S.K. (1998). "Traditional Calendar of Myanmar (Burma)". Indian Journal of History of Science. 33 (2): 143–160.
- Clancy, J.C. (January 1906). T. Lewis; H.P. Hollis (eds.). "The Burmese Calendar: A Monthly Review of Astronomy". The Observatory. XXIX (366).
- Eade, J.C. (1989). Southeast Asian Ephemeris: Solar and Planetary Positions, A.D. 638–2000. Ithaca: Cornell University. ISBN 978-0-87727-704-0.
- Eade, J.C. (1995). The Calendrical Systems of Mainland South-East Asia (illustrated ed.). Brill. ISBN 9789004104372.
- Htin Aung, Maung (1959). Folk Elements in Burmese Buddhism. Rangoon: Department of Religious Affairs.
- Irwin, Sir Alfred Macdonald Bulteel (1909). The Burmese and Arakanese calendars. Rangoon: Hanthawaddy Printing Works.
- Kala, U (1724). Maha Yazawin Gyi (in Burmese). Vol. 1–3 (2006, 4th printing ed.). Yangon: Ya-Pyei Publishing.
- Luce, G.H. (1970). Old Burma: Early Pagan. Vol. 2. Locust Valley, NY: Artibus Asiae and New York University.
- Ohashi, Yukio (2001). Alan K. L. Chan; Gregory K. Clancey; Hui-Chieh Loy (eds.). Historical Perspectives on East Asian Science, Technology, and Medicine (illustrated ed.). World Scientific. ISBN 9789971692599.
- Ohashi, Yukio (2007). "Astronomy in Mainland Southeast Asia". In H. Selin (ed.). Encyclopaedia of the History of Science, Technology, and Medicine in Non-Western Cultures (2, illustrated ed.). Springer. ISBN 9781402045592.
