= Public holidays in Myanmar =

16 distinct public holidays are observed in Myanmar.

== Public holidays ==
| Holiday | Date | Number of days | Remarks |
|---|---|---|---|
| New Year's Day | 1 January | 1 day | - |
| Independence Day | 4 January | 1 day | Marks independence from British Empire in 1948. |
| Chinese New Year | Varies | 1 day | |
| Union Day | 12 February | 1 day | Anniversary of the Panglong Agreement in 1947. |
| Peasants' Day | 2 March | 1 day | Commemorates the contribution of agriculture and farming to Myanmar. |
| Full Moon Day of Tabaung | Varies | 1 day | Known as Māgha Pūjā in other Asian countries, marked with pagoda festivals. Note: Date is based on the traditional Burmese calendar |
| Armed Forces Day | 27 March | 1 day | Formerly Resistance Day (against the Japanese occupation in 1945). |
| Myanmar New Year | Varies | 4 or 5 days | Thingyan Eve, Commencing Day to Prime Day, End of Thingyan, Myanmar New Year Day. Note: Date is based on the traditional Burmese calendar |
| Labour Day | 1 May | 1 day | Known as Worker's Day in some countries. |
| Full Moon Day of Kason (Vesak) | Varies | 1 day | Anniversary of the birth, enlightenment and death of the Buddha celebrated by watering the Bodhi tree. Note: Date is based on the traditional Burmese calendar |
| Martyrs' Day | 19 July | 1 day | Commemorates the assassination of Aung San and several other cabinet members in 1947. |
| Full Moon Day of Waso | Varies | 1 day | Marks the start of the Buddhist Lent Note: Date is based on the traditional Burmese calendar |
| Thadingyut Holidays | Varies | 9 days | Marks the end of the Buddhist lent; includes Pre-Full Moon Day, Full Moon Day of Thadingyut, Post-Full Moon Day. (Light Festival) Note: Date is based on the traditional Burmese calendar |
| Tazaungdaing Holidays | Varies | 2 days | Includes the Pre-Full Moon Day and Full Moon Day of Tazaungmon Note: Date is based on the traditional Burmese calendar |
| National Day | Varies | 1 day | Commemorates the anniversary of the first university student strike at Rangoon University in 1920. Note: Date is based on the traditional Burmese calendar (10th day following the full moon of Tazaungmon) |
| Christmas Day | 25 December | 1 day | The birthday of Jesus Christ. |
| Kayin New Year | Varies | 1 day | |
| Eid al-Adha | Varies | 1 day | Marks the end of Hajj to Mecca |
| Deepavali | Varies | 1 day | Note: Date is based on the traditional Burmese calendar (1st waxing day of Tazaungmon) |
