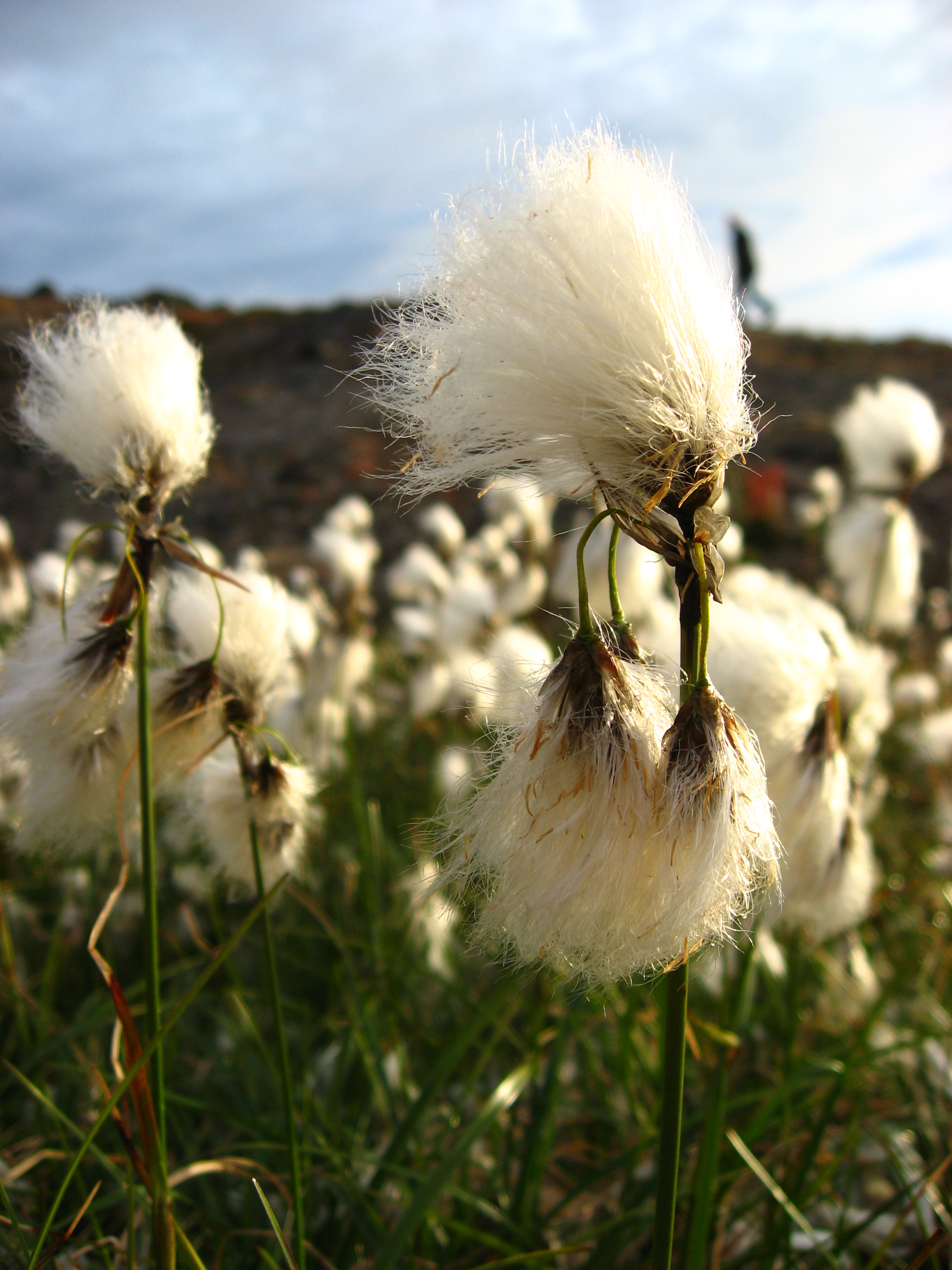

Conservation status
- Secure (NatureServe)

Scientific classification
- Kingdom: Plantae
- Clade: Tracheophytes
- Clade: Angiosperms
- Clade: Monocots
- Clade: Commelinids
- Order: Poales
- Family: Cyperaceae
- Genus: Eriophorum
- Species: E. angustifolium

Binomial name
- Eriophorum angustifolium Honck.

Subspecies
- E. a. subsp. angustifolium; E. a. subsp. triste (Th.Fr.) Hultén

Synonyms
- Eriophorum polystachion L.; Scirpus angustifolus T.Koyama

= Eriophorum angustifolium =

Species of flowering plant in the sedge family

Eriophorum angustifolium, commonly known as common cottongrass or common cottonsedge, is a species of flowering plant in the sedge family, Cyperaceae. Native to North America, North Asia, and Europe, it grows on peat or acidic soils, in open wetland, heath or moorland. It begins to flower in April or May and, after fertilisation in early summer, the small, unremarkable brown and green flowers develop distinctive white bristle-like seed-heads that resemble tufts of cotton; combined with its ecological suitability to bog, these characteristics give rise to the plant's alternative name, bog cotton.

Eriophorum angustifolium is a hardy, herbaceous, rhizomatous, perennial sedge, able to endure in a variety of environments in the temperate, subarctic and arctic regions of Earth. Unlike Gossypium, the genus from which cotton is derived, the bristles of E. angustifolium are unsuited to textile manufacturing. Nevertheless, in Northern Europe, they were used as a substitute in the production of paper, pillows, candle-wicks, and wound-dressings. The indigenous peoples of North America use the plant in cooking and in the treatment of digestive problems. Following a vote in 2002, Plantlife International designated E. angustifolium the County Flower of Greater Manchester, as part of its British County Flowers campaign.

== Description ==
In the wild, Eriophorum angustifolium is a creeping rhizomatous perennial sedge, with an abundance of unbranched, translucent pink roots. Fully grown, it has a tall, erect stem shaped like a narrow cylinder or triangular prism; it is smooth in texture and green in colour. Reports of the plant's height vary; estimates include up to 60 cm (24 in), 15–75 cm (5.9–29.5 in), and up to 100 cm (39 in). E. angustifolium has "stiff grass-like foliage" consisting of long, narrow solidly dark green leaves, which have a single central groove, and narrow from their 2–6-millimetre (0.08–0.24 in) wide base to a triangular tip. Up to seven green and brown aerial peduncles and chaffs, roughly 4–10 millimetres (0.16–0.39 in) in size, protrude from umbels at the top of the stem from which achenes are produced after fertilisation, each with a single pappus; these combine to form a distinctive white perianth around 5 centimetres (2.0 in) long.

Eriophorum angustifolium is described as "a rather dull plant" in winter and spring, but "simply breathtaking" in summer and autumn, when 1–7 conspicuous inflorescences – composed of hundreds of white pappi comparable to cotton, hair, tassels, and/or bristles – stand out against naturally drab surroundings.

Eriophorum angustifolium differs from other species within the genus Eriophorum in its habitat and morphology. Its multiple flower heads and growth from rhizomes distinguish it from E. vaginatum, which has a single flower head and grows from dense tussocks. Although E. latifolium has 2–12 flower heads, it has laxly caespitose (tufted) growth, and its pappi are forked. The smooth peduncles and preference for acidic soil pH distinguishes E. angustifolium from E. gracile, which grows in swamp with a neutral pH and has scabrid (rough) peduncles.

Habitus of Eriophorum angustifolium

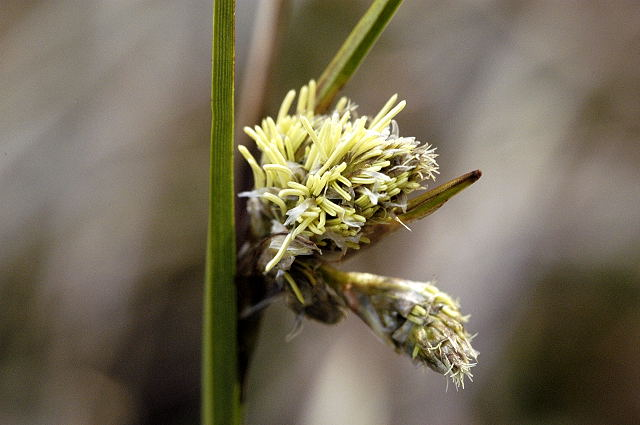
Flowering in April

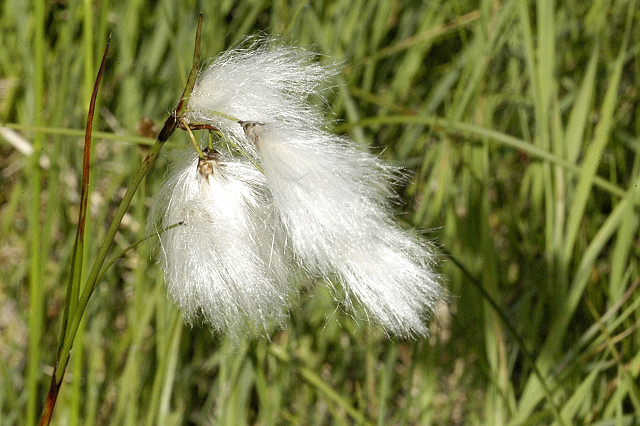
After fertilisation in June

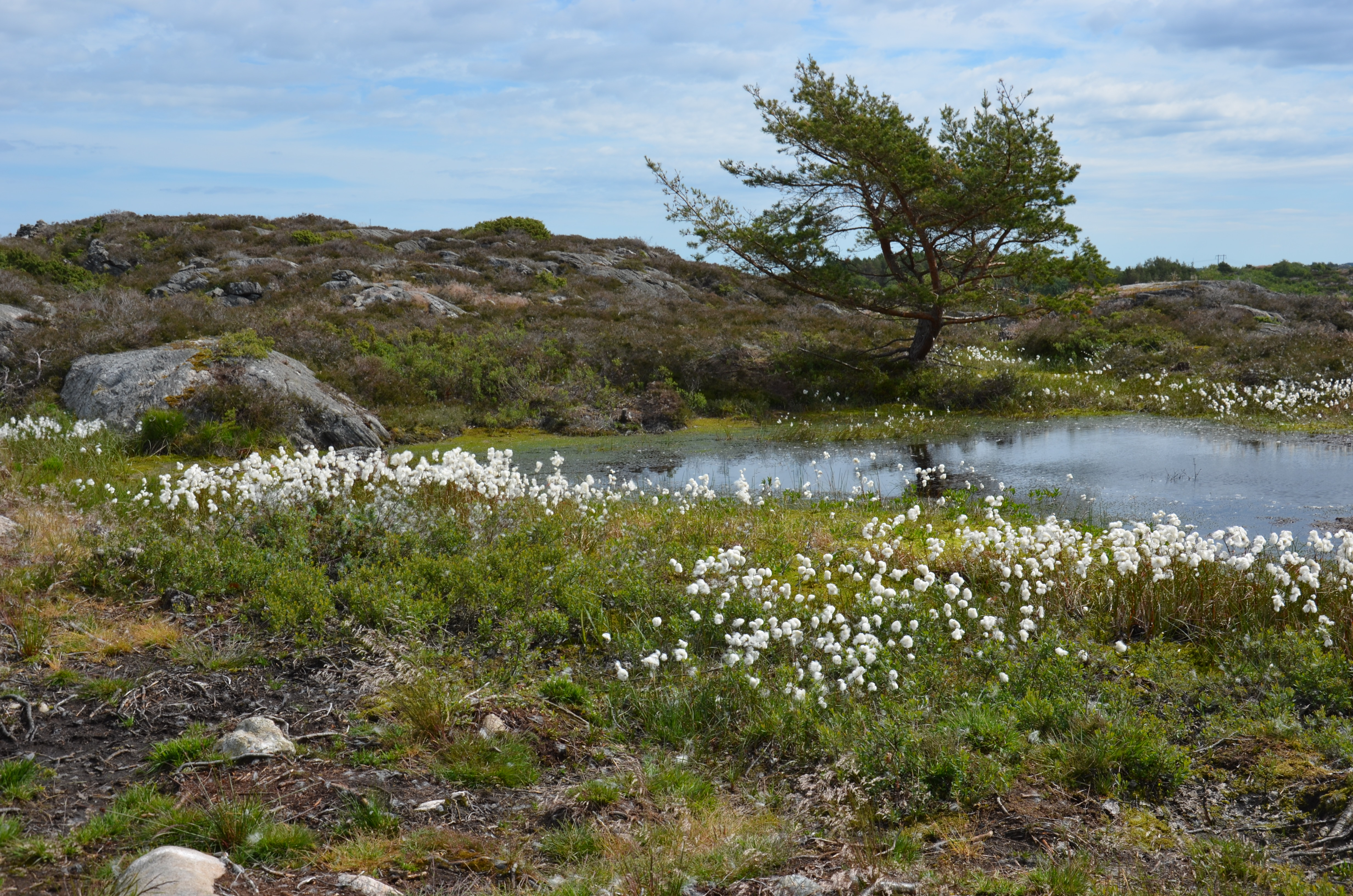
The fruiting plant is conspicuous.

== Taxonomy ==
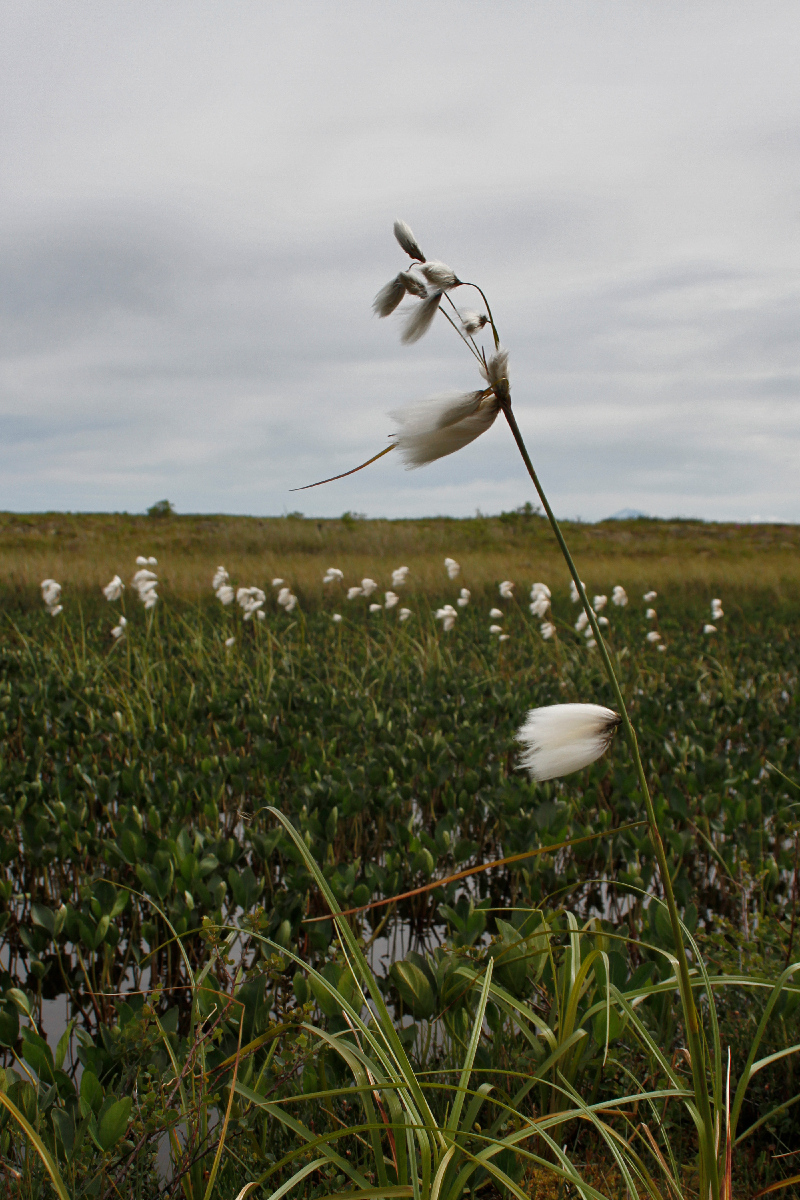
With both terminal and axillary inflorescences

The species was named Eriophorum angustifolium in 1782 by the German botanist Gerhard August Honckeny. The German botanist Albrecht Wilhelm Roth published this name in 1788, referring to Honckeny's work, and is sometimes erroneously considered the author of the species name. The genus name Eriophorum consists of two Ancient Greek roots – εριων (erion, "wool") and -φόρος (-phoros, "-bearing") – referring to the fibrous seed-heads of the genus, which resemble tufts of thread. The specific epithet angustifolium is composed of the Latin words angustus ("narrow") and folium ("leaf"). The Linnaean name Eriophorum polystachion is a nomen rejiciendum, being based on a mixed batch of specimens. Scirpus angustifolius is a later combination published by the Japanese botanist Tetsuo Koyama in 1958, but this generic assignment is not widely accepted.

Two subspecies are recognised within E. angustifolium. The autonymous subspecies, E. angustifolium subsp. angustifolium, is found in more southerly sites, while E. angustifolium subsp. triste has an overlapping distribution centred further north. The two also differ in height and the roughness of the peduncles, with E. a. subsp. angustifolium being up to 100 cm (39 in) tall and having smooth-surfaced peduncles, while E. a. subsp. triste has rough peduncles and only reaches 30 cm (12 in) tall.

In English, E. angustifolium is known by a variety of common names (with various spellings), including common cottongrass, common cotton-grass, common cottonsedge, tassel cotton grass, many-headed cotton-grass, thin-scale cotton-grass, tall cotton-grass, downy ling and bog cotton.

== Distribution and habitat ==
The global distribution of Eriophorum angustifolium (green) covers large areas of northern land masses.

Eriophorum angustifolium is native to the Northern Hemisphere, and distributed across Eurasia, North America and the British Isles, where there is open bog, heath, wetland and moorland, with standing water and calcareous peat or acidic soil. It can survive in the Subarctic and Arctic, and is found in Alaska, Finland and Greenland as far north as 83° N. The British botanist William Turner Thiselton-Dyer recorded E. angustifolium in the South African Republic in 1898.

In North America, Eriophorum angustifolium is found in the north from Alaska through Manitoba and the Canadian Prairies to Newfoundland and Labrador, down the Pacific Northwest and the state of Washington, across the Midwestern United States through Michigan and Iowa, down the Eastern Seaboard as far south-east as New York and New Jersey, and reaching as far south-west as New Mexico. In Eurasia, E. angustifolium is distributed throughout the Caucasus, European Russia and North Asia, including Siberia and the Kamchatka Peninsula, and south-east to Manchuria and Korea. It grows throughout continental Europe, with the exception of those parts within the Mediterranean Basin, growing in Scandinavia in the north, and as far south as the Norte Region of Portugal and the Pierian Mountains of Greece.

Eriophorum angustifolium is the most common of the four native species of Eriophorum in the British Isles, and has been recorded as having existed in all vice-counties, thriving particularly well in Ireland and northern and western regions of Great Britain, but less so in southern and eastern areas. In the mires of Northern Ireland and the South Pennines, it considered a ruderal, pioneer and keystone species, because it can quickly colonise and repair damaged or eroded peat, encourage the re-vegetation of its surroundings, and retain sediment and its landscape to serve as a carbon sink. In central and southern counties of England, the species is rare or absent, and was "completely destroyed" in Cambridgeshire, The Broads, The Fens and other parts of the East of England by human activities such as land reclamation. Within the British Isles, E. angustifolium thrives at a range of altitudes from sea-level fens and lowland meadows, to exposed upland moors when provided with a habitat of acid bog or waterlogged heath. It has an altitudinal limit of 1,100 metres (3,600 ft) above sea level, reaching 854 metres (2,802 ft) in the Wicklow Mountains of Ireland, and 1,060 metres (3,480 ft) in the Scottish Highlands.

== Ecology ==
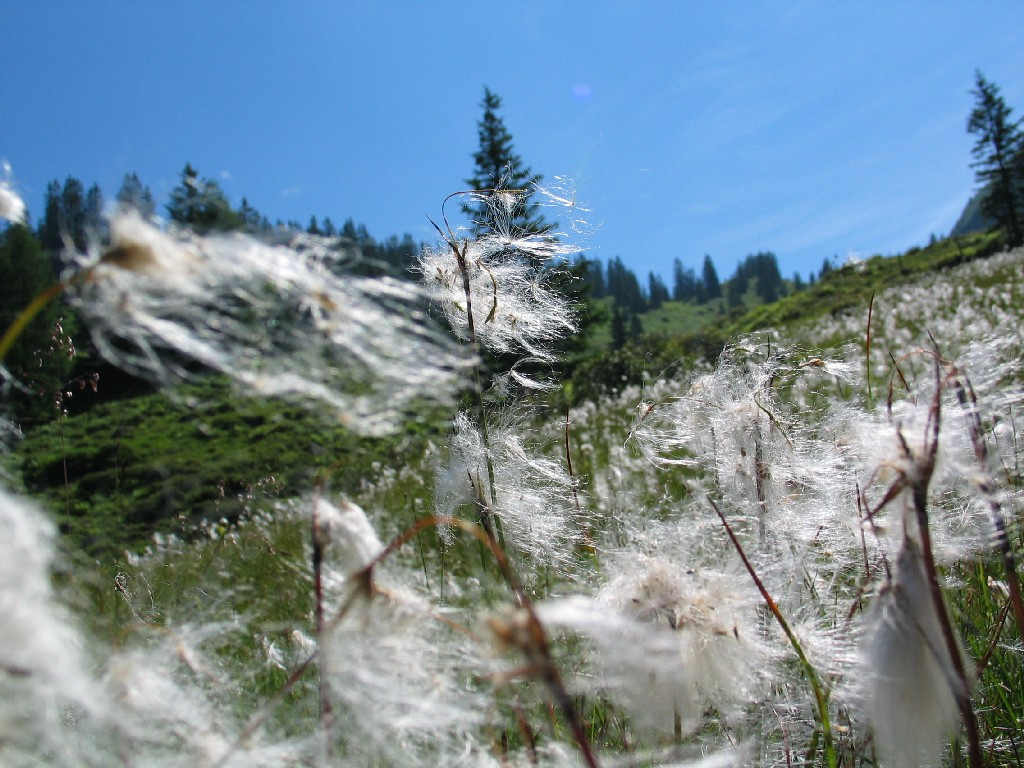
The seeds of E. angustifolium are adapted to wind-dispersal.

Eriophorum angustifolium is a hardy, herbaceous, rhizomatous, perennial plant, meaning that it is resilient to cold and freezing climatic conditions, dies back at the end of its growing season, has creeping rootstalks, and lives for over two years. It grows vigorously from seed over a period of 2–5 years, and thrives particularly well in freshly disturbed, cut or eroded peat. E. angustifolium is protogynous.

Sexual reproduction in Eriophorum angustifolium begins with flowering in spring or early summer (in or around May), when groups of 3–5 brown flowers are produced. Fertilisation usually takes place in May or June, via anemophily (wind-pollination), and the white bristle-like perianth, composed of achenes with pappi (seeds with hairs) then grows outwards to appear like short tufts of cotton thread. These pappi endure well into summer, lasting from around June to September. Like the pappus of Taraxacum (dandelions), this aids in wind-dispersal, and also serves as thermal insulation, conserving the temperature of the plant's reproductive organs by trapping solar radiation.

It is a known host to the fungal species Myriosclerotinia ciborium, Hysteronaevia advena, Lachnum imbecille and Lophodermium caricinum.

== Conservation ==
Eriophorum angustifolium has a NatureServe conservation status of G5, meaning that the species is considered to be ecologically secure by NatureServe, lacking any threats to its global abundance.

== Uses ==
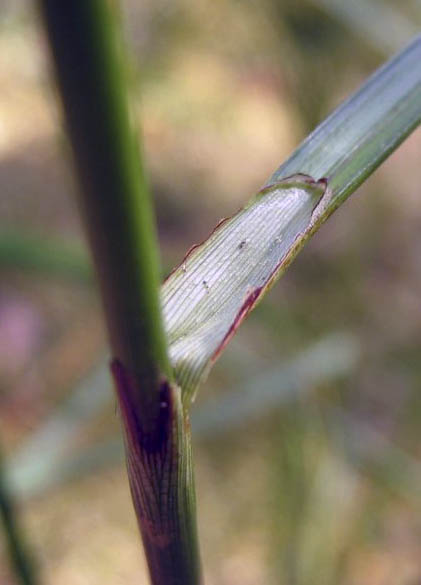
The stem of Eriophorum angustifolium, an edible part of the sedge used in Native American cuisine

Eriophorum angustifolium seeds and stems are edible and are used in traditional Native American cuisine by Alaska Natives, Inuit and Inupiat people. The leaves and roots of E. angustifolium are also edible and, because of their astringent properties, used by the Yupik peoples for medicinal purposes, through a process of decoction, infusion or poultice, to treat ailments of the human gastrointestinal tract, and in the Old World for the treatment of diarrhoea. In abundance, E. angustifolium can grow with enough density to disguise wetland and bog. Consequently, it may be used as a natural indicator of areas which are hazardous and to avoid travelling through. Attempts to make a cotton-like thread from the hairs of the plant's seed-heads have been thwarted by its brittleness, but it has been used in the production of paper and candle wicks in Germany, and was used as a feather substitute in pillow stuffing in Sweden and Sussex, England. In Scotland, during World War I, it was used to dress wounds.

=== Cultivation ===
Although "difficult to grow under cultivation", The Royal Horticultural Society states Eriophorum angustifolium can be cultivated as a low-maintenance wildflower, suitable for meadows, ponds margins or bog gardens. This may be done in sheltered or exposed terrain, but best accomplished with full sun at a south- or west-facing aspect, in water up to 5 centimetres (2.0 in) deep. Poorly-drained peat, sand, clay or loam with an acidic soil pH is required. Division in spring is the recommended form of propagation for the species, and regular deadheading is the recommended method of pruning. Narthecium ossifragum and Myrica gale are suitable for companion planting with E. angustifolium. Eriophorum angustifolium is "generally pest free". As a seedling and young plant it is eaten by sheep and cattle, and a variety of goose species. It is tolerant to chalybeate (iron-enriched) water, but may succumb to powdery mildews.

== Cultural significance ==
In 2002, the County Flowers campaign of Plantlife International, which asked members of the public to nominate and vote for a wildflower emblem for each of the counties and metropolitan areas of the United Kingdom, resulted in Eriophorum angustifolium being announced as the County Flower of Greater Manchester.

== Bibliography ==
- Ball, Peter W.; Wujek, Daniel E. (2002). "Eriophorum angustifolium". In Flora of North America Editorial Committee (ed.). Flora of North America North of Mexico (FNA). Vol. 23. New York and Oxford: Oxford University Press – via eFloras.org, Missouri Botanical Garden, St. Louis, MO & Harvard University Herbaria, Cambridge, MA.
- Beardshaw, Chris (2003). The Natural Gardener: Lessons from the Landscape. Trafalgar Square. ISBN 978-0-563-48804-0.
- Chadde, Steve W. (2012). Plant Indicators of Minnesota Wetlands: An annotated guide to wetland indicator status ratings for Minnesota. CreateSpace Independent Publishing Platform. ISBN 978-1-4783-5977-7.
- Crawford, R. M. M. (1988). Studies in Plant Survival. Wiley-Blackwell. ISBN 978-0-632-01477-4.
- Evans, Martin; Warburton, Jeff (2010). Geomorphology of Upland Peat: Erosion, Form and Landscape Change. Wiley-Blackwell. ISBN 978-1-4443-3741-9.
- Fox, A. D.; Stroud, D. A.; Francis, I. S. (1990). "Up-rooted common cotton-grass Eriophorum angustifolium as evidence of goose feeding in Britain and Ireland". Bird Study. 3 (37): 210–212. doi:10.1080/00063659009477059.
- Godwin, Harry (2009). The Archives of Peat Bogs. Cambridge University Press. ISBN 978-0-521-10712-9.
- Graves, George (1822). A Monograph on the British Grasses. Published by the author.
- Honckeny, Gerhard August (1782). Vollständiges systematisches Verzeichniß aller Gewächse in Teutschland zur Beförderung ihrer physikalischen und ökonomischen Geschichte (in German). Vol. 1. Leipzig: Siegfried Lebrecht Crusius.
- Jermy, A. C.; D. A. Simpson; M. J. Y. Foley & M. S. Porter (2007). "Eriophorum angustifolium Honck.". Sedges of the British Isles. BSBI Handbook No. 1 (3rd ed.). Botanical Society of the British Isles. pp. 78–80. ISBN 978-0-901158-35-2.
- Lucas, Neil (2011). Designing with Grasses. Timber Press. ISBN 978-0-88192-983-6.
- Mabey, Richard (1996). Flora Britannica. Chatto & Windus. ISBN 978-1-85619-377-1.
- May, Peter J. (2011). Water Features: a Guide to Their Design and Construction. Crowood Press. ISBN 978-1-84797-274-3.
- Moerman, Daniel E. (2010). Native American Food Plants: An Ethnobotanical Dictionary. Timber Press. ISBN 978-1-60469-189-4.
- Mohlenbrock, Robert H. (2001). Sedges: Cyperus to Scleria. Illustrated Flora of Illinois. Vol. 6 (2nd ed.). SIU Press. ISBN 978-0-8093-2358-6.
- Perring, Franklyn Hugh; Sell, Peter D.; Walters, Stuart Max; Whitehouse, Harold Leslie Kerr (2009). A Flora of Cambridgeshire. Cambridge University Press. ISBN 978-1-108-00240-0.
- Phillips, Marie E. (1954). "Biological Flora of the British Isles: Eriophorum angustifoloum Roth. (E. Polystachion L.)". Journal of Ecology. 42 (2): 612–622. doi:10.2307/2256893. JSTOR 2256893.
- Raine, Mike (2009). Nature of Snowdonia. Pesda Press. ISBN 978-1-906095-10-9.
- Raven, Sarah; Buckley, Jonathan (2012). Sarah Raven's Wild Flowers. Bloomsbury Publishing. ISBN 978-1-4088-1394-2.
- Robinson, Peter (2003). Pond Basics. Hamlyn. ISBN 978-0-600-61065-6.
- Roth, Albrecht Wilhelm (1788). Tentamen Florae Germanicae: Continens Enumerationem Plantarum in Germania Sponte Nascentium [Tentative Flora of Germany: Containing a List of Plants Growing in Germany] (in German and Latin). Vol. 1. Leipzig: I. G. Mülleriano.
- Runkel, Sylvan T.; Roosa, Dean M. (1999). Wildflowers and Other Plants of Iowa Wetlands. University of Iowa Press. ISBN 978-1-60938-035-9.
- Selin, H., ed. (2007). Encyclopaedia of the History of Science, Technology, and Medicine in Non-Western Cultures. Springer Reference Series (2nd ed.). Springer. ISBN 978-1-4020-4559-2.
- Slatcher, Julian (2012). Gardening with Wild Plants. GMC. ISBN 978-1-86108-803-1.
- Stace, Clive A. (2010). "Eriophorum L. – cottongrasses". New Flora of the British Isles (3rd ed.). Cambridge University Press. pp. 942–943. ISBN 978-0-521-70772-5.
- Streeter, David (2010). Collins Flower Guide. Collins. ISBN 978-0-00-718389-0.
- Strid, Arne; Tan, Kit, eds. (1991) [1986]. The Mountain Flora of Greece. Vol. 2. Edinburgh University Press. ISBN 978-0-7486-0207-0.
