= List of Burmese traditional festivals =

Burmese traditional festivals are based on the traditional Burmese calendar and dates are largely determined by the moon's phase. Traditionally, there are 12 general festivals, one for each month. These 12 festivals are grouped as a set alongside the 12 monthly flowers. Burmese culture is most evident in villages where local festivals are held throughout the year, the most important being the pagoda festival.

== Festivals ==
Month	Festival(s)	Day	Significance	Events
Tagu (April)	Thingyan	Mid-April	Marks the beginning of the Burmese new year	Gadaw (paying obeisance to elders), water splashing, water games and parades, observation of the Buddhist Sabbath (Uposatha)
Kason (May)	Bo tree watering festival (Vesak)	Full moon of Kason	Marks the birth, enlightenment and death of Gautama Buddha	Watering of the Bo tree, Buddhist sermons.
Nayon (June)	Tipitaka Festival		Nationwide Pariyatti Sasana examinations for Buddhist monks	
Waso (July)	Robe Offering Festival, Dhammasekya Day	Full moon of Waso	Marks the beginning of the Buddhist lent (Vassa); anniversary of Buddha's first sermon on the Four Noble Truths	Donation of monk robes, shinbyu ceremonies, offering of ginger flowers.
Wagaung (August)	Drawing Lots Festival		Supports monks during lent without preferences and hiearchies	Households draw lots to determine and which monk will receive their almsgiving, diminished in modern times outside of villages.
Wagaung (August)	Taungbyone Festival		Local festival honouring nats	
Tawthalin (September)	Regatta Festival			Boat rowing competitions
Thadingyut (October)	Festival of Lights	Full moon of Thadingyut	Marks the end of the Buddhist lent (Vassa)	Gift exchanges, gadaw (paying obeisance to elders), lighting of candles and fireworks, pagoda visits
Tazaungmon (November)	Tazaungdaing Festival of Lights	Full moon of Tazaungmon	Marks the end of the rainy season	Lighting of hot air balloons by the Shan people in Shan State, and lanterns nationwide
Tazaungmon (November)	Kahtein Thingan Offering Festival	Full moon of Tazaungmon	Between Thadingyut and Tazaungmon	Offering of Kathina robes to Buddhist monks
Tazaungmon (November)	Kyi Ma No Festival		Mischief-making	
Nadaw (December)	Poet's Day	First of the lunar month	Honouring literature and poets, originally U Ponnya day	Presentation of awards and honours to scholars, writers and poets.
Nadaw (December)	Karen New Year		Marks the new year of the Karen people	
Nadaw (December)	Nat festivals	Originally the traditional festival for Nadaw	Ritual feasts honoring Burmese nats (spirits)	
Pyatho (January)	Cavalry Festival		Honouring military heroes and knights	Military parades and games based on horsemanship and traditional weapons or shows of strength.
Pyatho (January)	Kachin Manaw Festival		Marks the new year of the Kachin people	
Tabodwe (February)	Htamane Festival	Full moon day	Celebrating fire and the end of winter, warding off evil spiritis	Cooking of htamane, a special sticky rice made with sesame seeds, peanuts and ginger; bonfires and cooking competitions, offering food to the Buddha.
Tabaung (March)	Sand Pagoda Festival		Celebrating stupas and the start of summer	Building sand pagodas.
Tabaung (March)	Shwedagon Pagoda Festival		Nationwide pagoda festivals	Celebrations on Singuttara Hill
