= Burmese calendar =

Burmese lunisolar calendar

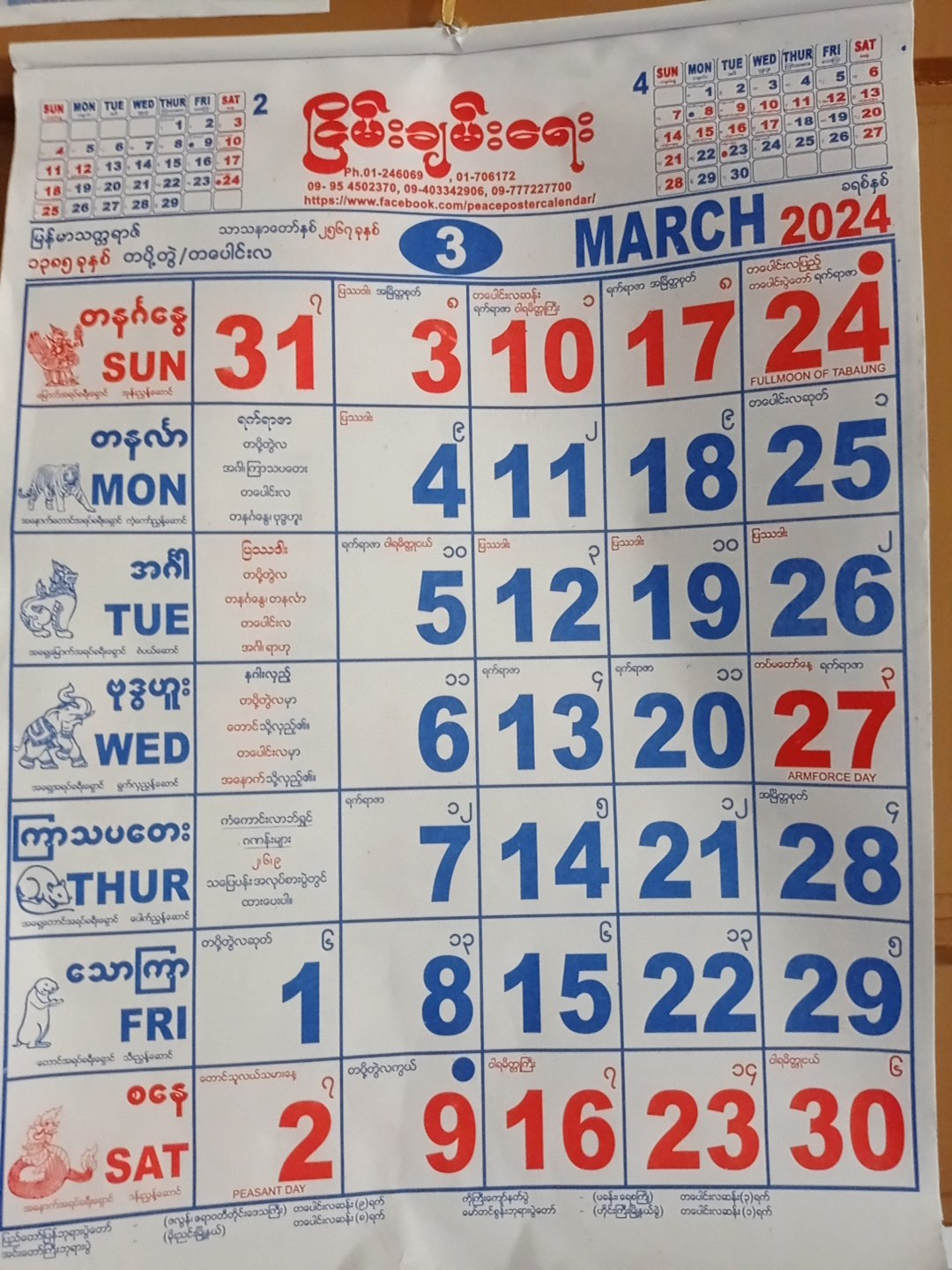
A Burmese calendar showing Tabodwe/Tabaung 1385

The Burmese calendar (Burmese: မြန်မာသက္ကရာဇ်, pronounced [mjəmà θɛʔkəɹɪʔ], or ကောဇာသက္ကရာဇ်, [kɔ́zà θɛʔkəɹɪʔ]; Burmese Era (BE) or Myanmar Era (ME)) is a lunisolar calendar in which the months are based on lunar months and years are based on sidereal years. The calendar is largely based on an older version of the Hindu calendar, though unlike the Indian systems, it employs a version of the Metonic cycle. The calendar therefore has to reconcile the sidereal years of the Hindu calendar with the Metonic cycle's near tropical years by adding intercalary months and days at irregular intervals.

The calendar has been used continuously in various Burmese states since its purported launch in 640 CE in the Sri Ksetra Kingdom, also called the Pyu era. It was also used as the official calendar in other mainland Southeast Asian kingdoms of Rakhine, Lan Na, Chiang Hung, Lan Xang, Siam, and Cambodia down to the late 19th century.

Today, the calendar is used in Myanmar as one of the two official calendars alongside the Gregorian calendar. It is still used to mark traditional holidays such as the Burmese New Year, and other traditional festivals, many of which are Burmese Buddhist in nature.

== History ==
=== Origin ===
The Burmese chronicles trace the origin of the Burmese calendar to ancient India with the introduction of the Kali Yuga Era in 3102 BCE. That seminal calendar is said to have been recalibrated by King Añjana (အဉ္စန), the maternal grandfather of the Buddha, in 691 BCE. That calendar in turn was recalibrated and replaced by the Buddhist Era with the starting year of 544 BCE. The Buddhist Era came to be adopted in the early Pyu city-states by the beginning of the Common Era. Then in 78 CE, a new era called the Shalivahana era, also called Sakra Era or Saka Era, was launched in India. Two years later the new era was adopted in the Pyu state of Sri Ksetra, and the era later spread to the rest of the Pyu states.

According to the chronicles, the Pagan Kingdom at first followed the prevailing Saka Pyu Era, but in 640 CE King Popa Sawrahan (r. 613–640) recalibrated the calendar, naming the new era Kawza Thekkarit (ကောဇာ သက္ကရာဇ် [kɔ́zà θɛʔkəɹɪʔ]) with a Year Zero starting date of 22 March 638 CE. It was used as the civil calendar, while the Buddhist Era remained in use as the religious calendar.

Scholarship accepts the chronicle narrative regarding the North Indian origin of the calendar and the chronology of adoption in Burma up to the Mahāsakaraj Era. Recent research suggests that the Gupta Era (epochal year of 320 CE) may also have been in use in the Pyu states. (Note: (Aung-Thwin 2005: 334–335): More research needs to be done. A Pyu stone inscription discovered in 1993 indicates that the Pyu states may have also used the Gupta Era.) Mainstream scholarship, however, holds that the recalibrated calendar was launched at Sri Ksetra, and later adopted by the upstart principality of Pagan.

=== Spread ===
The adoption by an ascendant Pagan paved the way for the calendar's adoption elsewhere in the Pagan Empire between the 11th and 13th centuries. The calendar first came to be used in peripheral regions or neighbouring states such as Arakan in the west and various Shan states in modern northern Thailand and Laos in the east, which adopted the calendar alongside folklore connected with the Burmese New Year. According to the Chiang Mai Chronicles and the Chiang Saen Chronicles, Chiang Mai and Chiang Saen and their tributary states of middle and upper Tai country (except Lamphun and Sukhothai) submitted to King Anawrahta and adopted the calendar in the mid-11th century in place of Mahāsakaraj, the standard calendar of the Khmer Empire. (Note: (Oriental 1900: 375–376): "The invasion of Lavo [Laos] ascribed to Anawrahta was more probably the work of some of his successors.") However, scholarship says the earliest evidence of Burmese calendar in modern Thailand dates only to the mid-13th century.

While the use of the calendar appears to have spread southward to Sukhothai and eastward to Laotian states in the following centuries, the official adoption farther south by the Ayutthaya Kingdom and farther east by Lan Xang came only after King Bayinnaung's conquests of those kingdoms in the 16th century. Subsequent Siamese kingdoms retained the Burmese calendar as the official calendar under the name of Chulasakarat (Pali: Culāsakaraj) until 1889. The Siamese adoption turned out to be the main catalyst for the calendar's usage in Cambodia, a periodic vassal of Siam between the 16th and 19th centuries. Likewise, the calendar spread to the Chittagong region of Bengal, which was dominated by the Arakanese Mrauk-U Kingdom from the 15th to 17th centuries.

=== Development and changes ===
The calculation system of the Burmese calendar was originally based on Thuriya Theiddanta (သူရိယသိဒ္ဓန္တ [θùɹḭja̰ θeiʔdàɰ̃ta̰], which is believed to be chiefly based on the "original" Surya Siddhanta system of ancient India (i.e. Ardharatrika school). One key difference from Indian systems was that the Burmese system followed a 19-year intercalation schedule (Metonic cycle). It is unclear from where, when or how the Metonic system was introduced; hypotheses range from China to Europe. (Note: (Ohashi 2001: 398–399): Astronomers of ancient India certainly knew of the Metonic cycle, and may have introduced the concept to Southeast Asia. However, the Metonic cycle, is incompatible with sidereal based Hindu calendars, and thus was not (and still is not) used in Hindu calendars. (Chatterjee 1998: 151) suggests that the Metonic system was introduced to Burma by Europeans. (Ohashi 2001: 398–399) rejects Chatterjee's hypothesis saying that "no other trace of European influence is found in South-East Asian astronomy." Instead, (Ohashi 2001: 401–403) suggests that China may have been the source of the Metonic cycle.)

The Burmese system thus uses a "strange" combination of sidereal years from the Indian calendar with the Metonic cycle, which is better for tropical years than sidereal years, so necessitating intercalation adjustments to reconcile the differences. Furthermore, the Burmese system did not incorporate advances in Indian calculation methods of the sidereal year until the mid-19th century. (Note: A.M.B. Irwin (Irwin 1909: 2–3) suggests that by 1738, the calendar was on the Makaranta system, an adaptation of the original Surya system. But J.C. Eade (Eade 1996: 17) doubts Irwin's assessment, saying he has found no differences with the original system still prevalent in mainland Southeast Asia at least to Pagan period inscriptions. Since the Burmese calendar was officially adopted only in 1564 in Siam, and since later Siamese calendars still used the original Surya, the Burmese calendar must have followed the original Surya at least to the 16th century, if not later. Even if the Makaranta system had come to be used in Burma in the following centuries, Ohashi (Ohashi 2007: 354–355) says the Burmese Makaranta system is "probably different from the well-known Indian Sanskrit astronomical table (Makarandasarani (1478 CE) of Makaranda, which follows the Saura school".) (The original Thuriya Theiddanta system is 0.56 second a year slower (and more accurate) than later Indian systems.)

The earliest attempts on record to change the calendar were superficial. On the 800th anniversary of the calendar (29 March 1438), King Mohnyin Thado recalibrated the calendar to Year 2 (with Year Zero beginning on 18 March 1436). But the king died just over a year after the launch, and the new era died out a few years later. The next proposed change came in March 1638 from King Prasat Thong of Siam who in preparation of the upcoming millennial anniversary (10 April 1638) wanted to make a change to the governing animals of the months. As the practice was not prevalent in Burma, the proposal was rejected by King Thalun.

Meanwhile, the growing cumulative discrepancy between the civil solar and luni-solar years attracted increasing attention. In the 1100th anniversary year (1738 CE) a new system of calculation was proposed that aimed to correct the errors of the original system, but the Toungoo court did not take any action. The present Surya Siddhanta (i.e., Saura school) was introduced to the Konbaung court in 1786, and was translated into Burmese after about 50 years. Finally, a new system called Thandeikta was proposed by Nyaunggan Sayadaw, a Buddhist monk, in Year 1200 (1838 CE).

The new system was a hybrid between the original and the updated Surya schools. Unlike the new Surya, Thandeikta does not adopt the system of apparent reckoning; mean years and mean months are still used. It also retains the practice of placing the intercalary month always next to Waso and the intercalary day always at the end of Nayon, and only in a year which has an intercalary month. But Thandeikta follows the new Surya in small alterations of the length of the year and the month. The prevailing Metonic schedule was modified, and intercalary months were so fixed as to prevent further divergence between the solar and luni-solar years. With the support of Princess Sekkya Dewi, who later became the chief queen of King Mindon, the new system was fully adopted in 1853. The first adjustment to then existing Metonic Cycle was made by putting an intercalary month in 1201 ME (1839 CE) instead of 1202 ME (1840).

While the new system has seemingly narrowed the gap between the calendar's solar and lunar years, it has not made the calendar more accurate when compared against the actual tropical year. Indeed, it is slightly worse than the old system. (The Thandeikta solar year is about 23 minutes 51.4304 seconds ahead of the mean solar year whereas Makaranta is about 23 minutes 50.8704 seconds ahead.) As a result, the calendar has kept on drifting away from the actual solar year. The calendarists have periodically resorted to modifying its intercalation schedule, based on apparent reckoning, to keep pace, at the expense of making publishing future calendars more than a few years out all but impossible.

In sum, at various times the calendar has used at least three slightly different methods of calculation to determine the insertion times of the intercalary day and month.

Era	Definition	Description
Thuriya Theiddanta	Prior to 1215 ME (to 1853 CE)	Metonic cycle determines intercalary day and month insertion points
Thandeikta	1215–1311 ME (1853–1950 CE)	Modified Metonic cycle: # of excess days in the first 4 months determines intercalary day and month insertion points
Current	1312 ME (1950 CE) to present	Current system used by Myanmar Calendar Advisory Board; Modified Metonic cycle: # of excess days in the first 8 months determines intercalary day and month insertion points

=== Current status ===
The calendar fell out of official status in several mainland Southeast Asian kingdoms (except Burma) in the second half of the 19th century with the arrival of European colonialism. The Gregorian calendar replaced the Burmese calendar in Cambodia in 1863 and Laos in 1889. (Note: (Simms and Simms 2001: 204–210) Laos became a French protectorate in March 1889, although the former overlord Siam would not acknowledge it until October 1893.) In 1889, the only remaining independent kingdom in Southeast Asia, Siam, also replaced the Burmese calendar and switched to the Gregorian calendar as the official civil calendar and the Ratanakosin Era (with 1782 CE as Year 1) as the traditional lunisolar calendar.

In Burma (Myanmar), the Burmese calendar has not been replaced, but used alongside the Gregorian calendar after the fall of the Burmese kingdom. Thailand has moved on to its own version of the Buddhist calendar since 1941, although the Chulasakarat-era dates remain the most commonly used and preferred form of entry in academic use for historical studies. The Magi-San calendar, identical to the Arakanese calendar, is still used by Chakma and Marma (Mogh) ethnic minorities of Bangladesh and Tripura in India.

Today, the Calendar Advisory Board within the Ministry of Religious Affairs and Culture of Myanmar is tasked with keeping the lunisolar calendar in line with the solar year.

== Structure ==
=== Day ===
The calendar recognises two types of day: astronomical and civil. The mean Burmese astronomical day is from midnight to midnight, and represents 1/30 of a synodic month or 23 hours, 37 minutes and 28.08 seconds. The civil day comprises two halves, the first half beginning at sunrise and the second half at sunset. In practice, four points of the astronomical and civil day (sunrise, noon, sunset, and midnight) were used as reference points. The civil day is divided into 8 baho (ဗဟို [bəhò]) (3 hours) or 60 nayi (နာရီ [nàjì]) (24 minutes), each baho equalling 7.5 nayi. In the past, a gong (မောင်း [máʊɴ]) was struck every nayi while a drum (စည် [sì]) and a large bell (ခေါင်းလောင်း [kʰáʊɴ láʊɴ]) were struck to mark every baho.

Type	Time	Burmese name	Description
Day	1 o'clock	နံနက် တစ်ချက်တီး	midway between sunrise and midday
Day	2 o'clock	နေ့ နှစ်ချက်တီး	noon (midday)
Day	3 o'clock	နေ့ သုံးချက်တီး	midway between noon and sunset
Day	4 o'clock	နေ့ လေးချက်တီး	sunset
Night	1 o'clock	ည တစ်ချက်တီး	midway between sunset and midnight
Night	2 o'clock	ည နှစ်ချက်တီး	midnight
Night	3 o'clock	ည သုံးချက်တီး	midway between midnight and sunrise
Night	4 o'clock	နံနက် လေးချက်တီး	sunrise

Although the popular usage never extended beyond baho and nayi measurements, the calendar consists of time units down to the millisecond level.

Unit	Sub-units	Approximate equivalent time
yet ရက်	8 baho	1 day
baho ဗဟို (Note: archaic spelling ပဟိုရ် as seen in the Maha Yazawin chronicle (Maha Yazawin Vol. 2: 260))	7.5 nayi	3 hours
nayi နာရီ	4 pat	24 minutes
pat ပါဒ်	15 bizana	6 minutes
bizana ဗီဇနာ	6 pyan	24 seconds
pyan ပြန်	10 khaya	4 seconds
khaya ခရာ	12 khana	0.4 second
khana ခဏ	4 laya	0.03333 second
laya လယ	1.25 anukhaya	0.00833 second
anukhaya အနုခရာ	<base unit>	0.00667 second

Only the following are used in calendrical calculations:

Unit	Sub-units	Approximate equivalent time
yet	60 nayi	1 day
nayi	60 bizana	24 minutes
bizana	60 khaya	24 seconds
khaya	60 anukhaya	0.4 second
anukhaya	<base unit>	0.00667 second

Therefore, modern time units can be expressed as:

Unit	Approximate equivalent Burmese units
hour	2.5 nayi
minute	2.5 bizana
second	2.5 khaya

=== Week ===
The civil week consists of seven days. It was also customary to denote the day of the week by its preassigned numerical value between zero and six. The names Taninganwe (Sunday) and Taninla (Monday) are derived from Old Burmese but the rest from Sanskrit.

Numerical notation	Name	IPA	Description
0	Sanay စနေ	[sənè]	Saturday
1	Taninganwe တနင်္ဂနွေ	[tənɪ́ɴɡənwè]	Sunday
2	Taninla တနင်္လာ	[tənɪ́ɴlà]	Monday
3	Inga အင်္ဂါ	[ɪ̀ɴɡà]	Tuesday
4	Boddahu ဗုဒ္ဓဟူး	[boʊʔdəhú]	Wednesday
5	Kyathabade ကြာသပတေး	[tɕàðàbədé]	Thursday
6	Thaukkya သောကြာ	[θaʊʔtɕà]	Friday

=== Month ===
The calendar recognises two types of months: synodic month and sidereal month. The synodic months are used to compose the years while the 27 lunar sidereal days (နက္ခတ် [nɛʔkʰaʔ]; from Sanskrit nakshatra), alongside the 12 signs of the zodiac, are used for astrological calculations. (The calendar also recognises a solar month called Thuriya Matha, which is defined as 1/12th of a year. But the solar month varies by the type of year such as tropical year, sidereal year, etc.)

Type	Mean # of days per Thuriya Theiddanta	Mean # of days per Thandeikta
Synodic lunar month စန္ဒရမာသ လ	29.530583	29.530587946
Sidereal month နက္ခတ္တမာသ လ	27.3216574	

The days of the month are counted in two halves, waxing (လဆန်း [la̰záɴ]) and waning (လဆုတ် [la̰zoʊʔ]). The 15th of the waxing (လပြည့် [la̰bjḛ]) is the civil full moon day. The civil new moon day (လကွယ် [la̰ɡwɛ̀]) is the last day of the month (14th or 15th waning). The mean and real (true) New Moons rarely coincide. The mean New Moon often precedes the real New Moon.

Type	Days	Description
Waxing လဆန်း	1 to 15	from New Moon to Full Moon
Full Moon လပြည့်	15	Full Moon
Waning လဆုတ်	1 to 14 or 15	from Full Moon to New Moon
New Moon လကွယ်	15	New Moon

As the Synodic lunar month is approximately 29.5 days, the calendar uses alternating months of 29 and 30 days. The 29-day months are called yet-ma-son la (ရက်မစုံလ), and the 30-day months are called yet-son la (ရက်စုံလ). Unlike in other Southeast Asian traditions, the Burmese calendar uses Burmese names for the month names. Although the names sound foreign in origin to modern Burmese ears, all but three are derived from Old Burmese. The three exceptions—Mleta/Myweta (မ္လယ်တာ / မြွယ်တာ), Nanka (နံကာ), Thantu (သန်တူ)—which all fall during the Buddhist Lent, have been replaced by newer Burmese names (Waso, Wagaung, Thadingyut), which used to mean just the Full Moon days of the three months.

Burmese	Mon	# of days (non-leap year)
Tagu တန်ခူး	Ce စဲ, /coa/	29
Kason ကဆုန်	Pas ပသာ်, /pəsaik/	30
Nayon နယုန်	Hje ဇှ်ေ, /cèh/	29
Waso ဝါဆို	Daguin ဓဂိုန်, /həkɜ̀n/	30
Wagaung ဝါခေါင်	Sresi သ္ဍဲသဳ, /hədoa sɔe/	29
Tawthalin တော်သလင်း	Bhat ဘတ်, /phòt/	30
Thadingyut သီတင်းကျွတ်	Hva ဝှ်, /wòh/	29
Tazaungmon တန်ဆောင်မုန်း	Gahtuin ဂထိုန်, /kəthɒn/	30
Nadaw နတ်တော်	Mreggatui မြေဂ္ဂသဵု, /pəròikkəsɒ/	29
Pyatho ပြာသို	Puh ပုဟ်, /paoh/	30
Tabodwe တပို့တွဲ	Ma မာ်, /màik/	29
Tabaung တပေါင်း	Phawraguin ဖဝ်ရဂိုန်, /phɔrəkɜ̀n/	30

In great leap years, the month of Nayon gets an extra intercalary day called yet-lun (ရက်လွန်) or yet-ngin (ရက်ငင်) and has 30 days. In the Arakanese calendar, the month of Tagu gets the extra intercalary day in great leap years.

=== Year ===
==== Types of astronomical year ====
The calendar recognises three types of astronomical year: tropical year, sidereal year and anomalistic year.

Year Name	Description	# of mean solar days by original Surya	# of mean solar days by Thandeikta
Thawanamatha Hnit သာဝနမာသနှစ်	tropical year	365.25875	365.2587564814
Nekkhattamahta Hnit နက္ခတ္တမာသနှစ်	sidereal year	365.2729132	
Thuriyamatha Hnit သူရိယမာသနှစ်	anomalistic year	365.2770951	

==== Types of calendar year ====
The Burmese calendar is a lunisolar calendar in which the months are based on lunar months and years are based on solar years. One of its primary objectives is to regulate the lunar part that it will keep pace with the solar part. The lunar months, normally twelve of them, consist alternately of 29 days and 30 days, such that a normal lunar year will contain 354 days, as opposed to the solar year of ~365.25 days. Therefore, some form of addition to the lunar year (of intercalation) is necessary. The overall basis for it is provided by cycles of 57 years. Eleven extra days are inserted in every 57 years, and seven extra months of 30 days are inserted in every 19 years (21 months in 57 years). This provides 20819 complete days to both calendars.

As such, the calendar adds an intercalary month (ဝါထပ် [wà daʔ]) in leap years (ဝါငယ်ထပ်နှစ် [wàŋɛ̀daʔ n̥ɪʔ]) and sometimes also an intercalary day (ရက်ငင် [jɛʔ ŋɪ̀ɴ]) in great leap years (ဝါကြီးထပ်နှစ် [wàdʑídaʔ n̥ɪʔ]). The intercalary month not only corrects the length of the year but also corrects the accumulating error of the month to extent of half a day. The average length of the month is further corrected by adding a day to Nayon at irregular intervals—a little more than seven times in two cycles (39 years). The intercalary day is never inserted except in a year which has an intercalary month. The Hindu calendar inserts an intercalary month at any time of year as soon as the accumulated fractions amount to one month. The Burmese calendar however always inserts the intercalary month at the same time of the year, after the summer solstice while the Arakanese calendar inserts it after the vernal equinox.

The actual calendar year (Wawharamatha Hnit, ဝေါဟာရမာသနှစ်) consists of 354, 384 or 385 days.

Month	Regular year	Small leap year	Big leap year
Tagu	29	29	29
Kason	30	30	30
Nayon	29	29	30
Waso	30	30	30
2nd Waso	n/a	30	30
Wagaung	29	29	29
Tawthalin	30	30	30
Thadingyut	29	29	29
Tazaungmon	30	30	30
Nadaw	29	29	29
Pyatho	30	30	30
Tabodwe	29	29	29
Tabaung	30	30	30
Total	354	384	385

The Thai Chulasakarat calendar uses a slightly different method to place the intercalary day. Instead of it in a leap year as in the Burmese system, the Thai system places it in a separate year. Thus, the Thai small leap year has 355 days while the Thai great leap year has 384 days. Both systems arrive at the same number of days in a 19-year cycle however. Furthermore, in contrast to Indian calendars, the Burmese calendar follows a Metonic cycle in which intercalary months are inserted on a set schedule. However, because the Burmese calendar has to adjust for the use of Indian-calendar-derived sidereal years with the Metonic cycle's tropical years, maintaining a set Metonic cycle has been a challenge.

The calendar seems to have employed several schedules to determine which of the 19 years will be intercalary years. To find out which year will have an intercalary month, the Burmese year is divided by 19. The quotient is the expired cycles. If the remainder tallies with the set sequence number of the prevailing Metonic cycle, then it will be an intercalary year.

System	Intercalary years in 19-year cycle
Pre-1740	2, 5, 8, 10, 13, 16, 18
1740	2, 5, 7, 10, 13, 15, 18
1892	1, 4, 7, 9, 12, 15, 18
1990s	1, 4, 6, 9, 12, 15, 18

==== New Year's Day ====
Since the main purpose of the Burmese calendar is to keep pace with the solar year, the new year is always marked by the solar year, which falls at the time when the Sun enters Aries. The date, which at present falls on 16 or 17 April, has slowly drifted over the centuries. In the 20th century, the New Year's Day fell on 15 or 16 April but in the 17th century, it fell on 9 or 10 April.

As a result, the New Year's Day of the Burmese calendar does not have to fall on the first day of the first month of Tagu; in fact, it almost never does fall on the first waxing of Tagu. Tagu is almost always divided into two parts Hnaung Tagu (နှောင်းတန်ခူး [n̥áʊɴ dəɡú]; "Late Tagu"), before the New Year's Day and Oo Tagu (ဦးတန်ခူး [ʔú dəɡú]; "Early Tagu") on and after the New Year's Day. In some years, the year was so behind the solar year that the new year falls in Kason and both Hnaung Tagu and Hnaung Kason (နှောင်းကဆုန် [n̥áʊɴ kəsʰòʊɴ]; "Late Kason") exist. Therefore, just saying "Tagu of 1373 ME" is not complete as "Oo Tagu of 1373" corresponds to 2011 CE while "Hnaung Tagu of 1373" corresponds to 2012 CE.

=== Cycle ===
The calendar used to employ a 12-year Jovian cycle that redeployed the lunar month names and attached them to the years. The Burmese cycle is not the more familiar Jovian cycle of India with 60 years in it. The practice existed in the Pagan period but had died out by the 17th century.

Remainder (year÷12)	Name
0	Pushya; ပုဿနှစ် / ဖုသျှနှစ် (Note: Cycle-year spellings by Hla Tin in his preface of the 1960 publication of the Zatadawbon Yazawin chronicle: ဖုသျှနှစ်; စယနှစ်; သရဝဏ်နှစ်; မိဂသီနှစ်)
1	Magha; မာခနှစ်
2	Phalguni; ဖ္လကိုန်နှစ်
3	Chitra; စယ်နှစ် / စယနှစ်
4	Visakha; ပိသျက်နှစ်
5	Jyeshtha; စိဿနှစ်
6	Ashadha; အာသတ်နှစ်
7	Sravana; သရဝန်နှစ် / သရဝဏ်နှစ်
8	Bhadrapaha; ဘဒ္ဒြသံဝစ္ဆိုရ်နှစ်
9	Asvini; အာသိန်နှစ်
10	Krittika; ကြတိုက်နှစ်
11	Mrigasiras; မြိက္ကသိုဝ်နှစ် / မိဂသီနှစ်

=== Epoch ===
Burmese tradition recognises the following eras. The Buddhist Era and Kawza Era are still in use in Myanmar.

Burmese name	Description	Year 0 date
Maha Thekkarit မဟာ သက္ကရာဇ်	Anjanasakaraj	10 March 691 BCE
Thathana Thekkarit သာသနာ သက္ကရာဇ်	Buddhist Era	13 May 544 BCE (Note: (Kala Vol. 1 2006: 38): According to Burmese tradition, the Buddha died on the full moon day of Kason 148 Anjanasakaraj.)
Pyu (Saka) Era ပျူ သက္ကရာဇ်	Shalivahana era (Mahāsakaraj in Thailand)	17 March 78 CE
Kawza Thekkarit ကောဇာ သက္ကရာဇ်	Current Burmese calendar Chulasakarat	22 March 638 (Note: (Luce Vol. 2 1970: 336): According to planetary positions, the current Burmese era technically began at 11:11:24 on 22 March 638.)
Mohnyin Thekkarit မိုးညှင်း သက္ကရာဇ်		18 March 1436

== Accuracy ==
The Burmese calendar uses lunar months but tries to keep pace with the solar year. The present Thandeikta system's solar year is about 23 minutes 51.43 seconds ahead of the actual mean tropical year of 365.241289 days. The older Makaranta system was actually slightly more accurate, with 23 minutes 50.87 seconds ahead of the actual year. The table below shows how Thandeikta purports to achieve a narrower difference (hence better accuracy) over Makaranta.

	Makaranta	Thandeikta
19 solar years	6939.91625 days	6939.9163731466 days
235 lunations	6939.687005 days	6939.68816731 days
Difference	0.229245 day	0.2282058366 day

The gain in accuracy is 0.0010391634 day (89.78371776 seconds) over 19 years, or about 4.72546 seconds a year. However, this gain is illusory as Thandeikta achieves the gain by redefining the mean lunar month (lunation), which is then more accurate and the solar year, which is less accurate. The table below shows the solar years of both systems in comparison with the actual mean tropical year. Thandeikta is 0.56 second a year less accurate than Makaranta.

	Makaranta	Thandeikta
19 solar years per own definition	6939.91625 days	6939.9163731466 days
Actual 19 tropical years	6939.601591 days	6939.601591 days
Difference over 19 years	0.314659 day	0.3147821466 day
Difference over per year	23.84784 minutes (1430.8704 seconds)	23.85717322 minutes (1431.430393 seconds)

In sum, both systems are about 24 minutes per year ahead of the actual tropical year; the systems' methods of intercalation fixes only their internal error; and Thandeikta slightly accelerates the annual drift. The accumulating error means the New Year's Day, which used to fall near the vernal equinox at its launch on 22 March 638 CE (Julian), fell on 17 April (Gregorian) in 2022—a difference of 23 days. (Note: (Eade 1989: 39): The Burmese calendar's epoch began on 22 March 638 CE (Julian calendar) (25 March 638 CE, Gregorian). In 2022, the new year's day fell on 17 April (Gregorian) / 4 April (Julian). This means the Burmese new year has moved by about 23 days (31-25+17=23) versus the Gregorian calendar, and by about 13 days (31-22+4) versus the Julian calendar.) Burmese calendarists have dealt with the issue by using apparent reckoning and periodically modifying the intercalation schedule in the Metonic cycle. One major downside of this approach is that it is difficult to publish future calendars more than a few years (often even a year) ahead.

== Zodiac ==
=== Seasons ===
The Burmese zodiac, like the Western zodiac, is divided into 12 signs called yathi (ရာသီ [jàðì]). The Burmese signs are identical to Indian and Western signs as they were derived from Indian and ultimately Western zodiac. Each yathi is divided into 30 degrees (အင်္သာ [ɪ̀ɴðà]); each degree into 60 minutes (လိတ္တာ [leiʔtà]); and each minute into 60 seconds (ဝိလိတ္တာ [wḭleiʔtà]).

Longitude အင်္သာ	Sign ရာသီ	Sanskrit	Latin	Ruling planet ရာသီခွင်
0°	Meittha မိဿ	Meṣha मेष	Aries	Mars
30°	Pyeittha ပြိဿ	Vṛiṣabha वृषभ	Taurus	Venus
60°	Mehton မေထုန်	Mithuna मिथुन	Gemini	Mercury
90°	Karakat ကရကဋ်	Karkaṭa कर्कट	Cancer	Moon
120°	Thein သိဟ်	Siṃha सिंह	Leo	Sun
150°	Kan ကန်	Kanyā कन्या	Virgo	Mercury
180°	Tu တူ	Tulā तुला	Libra	Venus
210°	Byeissa ဗြိစ္ဆာ	Vṛścika वृश्चिक	Scorpio	Mars
240°	Danu ဓနု	Dhanuṣa धनुष	Sagittarius	Jupiter
270°	Makara မကာရ	Makara मकर	Capricorn	Saturn
300°	Kon ကုံ	Kumbha कुम्भ	Aquarius	Saturn
330°	Mein မိန်	Mīna मीन	Pisces	Jupiter

=== Lunar mansions ===
The zodiac month consists of 27 days, approximating the mean sidereal month of 27.321661 days. Thus each zodiac day, called nekkhat, represents a lunar mansion, or a segment of the ecliptic along which the Moon revolves around the Earth. Though the names are Burmese adaptations of Sanskrit names, the Burmese system is not the same as the modern Indian system. The Burmese system uses unequal spaces for each segment (from 5° to 26°), and the first segment, Athawani, begins at 350° longitude. The modern Indian system uses equal segments of 13° 20' (360° divided by 27), and the first segment, Asvini, begins at 0°. The list below follows the Thandeikta system.

Day	Burmese	Sanskrit	Extent	Range
1	Athawani အဿဝဏီ	Asvini	18°	350°–8°
2	Barani ဘရဏီ	Bharani	10°	8°–18°
3	Kyattika ကြတ္တိကာ	Krittika	16°	18°–34°
4	Yawhani ရောဟဏီ	Rohini	12°	34°–46°
5	Migathi မိဂသီ	Mrigasiras	14°	46°–60°
6	Adra အဒြ	Ardra	5°	60°–65°
7	Ponnahpukshu ပုဏ္ဏဖုသျှု	Punarvasu	27°	65°–92°
8	Hpusha ဖုသျှ	Pushya	14°	92°–106°
9	Athaleiktha အသလိဿ	Aslesha	12°	106°–118°
10	Maga မာဃ	Magha	11°	118°–129°
11	Pyobba Baragonni ပြုဗ္ဗာ ဘရဂုဏ္ဏီ	Purva Phalguni	16°	129°–145°
12	Ottara Baragonni ဥတ္တရာ ဘရဂုဏ္ဏီ	Uttara Phalguni	9°	145°–154°
13	Hathada ဟဿဒ	Hasta	10°	154°–164°
14	Seiktra စိတြ	Chitra	15°	164°–179°
15	Thwati သွာတိ	Svati	13°	179°–192°
16	Withaka ဝိသာခါ	Visakha	21°	192°–213°
17	Anuyada အနုရာဓ	Anuradha	11°	213°–224°
18	Zehta ဇေဋ္ဌ	Jyeshtha	5°	224°–229°
19	Mula မူလ	Mula	13°	229°–242°
20	Pyobba Than ပြုဗ္ဗာသဠ်	Purva Ashadha	15°	242°–257°
21	Ottara Than ဥတ္တရာသဠ်	Uttara Ashadha	5°	257°–262°
22	Tharawun သရဝဏ်	Sravana	13°	262°–275°
23	Danatheikda ဓနသိဒ္ဓ	Dhanishtha	12°	275°–287°
24	Thattabeiksha သတ္တဘိသျှ	Satataraka	26°	287°–313°
25	Pyobba Parabaik ပြုဗ္ဗာ ပုရပိုက်	Purva Bhadrapada	10°	313°–323°
26	Ottara Parabaik ဥတ္တရာ ပုရပိုက်	Uttara Bhadrapada	16°	323°–339°
27	Yewati ရေဝတီ	Revati	11°	339°–350°

=== Weekdays ===
The Burmese zodiac recognises eight signs in a seven-day week.

Cardinal direction	Burmese	Sanskrit	English	Planet	Sign
Northeast	Taninganwe တနင်္ဂနွေ	Aditya	Sunday	Sun	Garuda ဂဠုန်
East	Taninla တနင်္လာ	Chandra	Monday	Moon	Tiger ကျား
Southeast	Inga အင်္ဂါ	Angaraka	Tuesday	Mars	Lion ခြင်္သေ့
South	Boddahu ဗုဒ္ဓဟူး	Budha	Wednesday a.m.	Mercury	Tusked elephant ဆင်
Northwest	Rahu ရာဟု	Rahu	Wednesday p.m.	Lunar node	Tuskless elephant ဟိုင်း
West	Kyathabade ကြာသပတေး	Bṛhaspati	Thursday	Jupiter	Rat ကြွက်
North	Thaukkya သောကြာ	Shukra	Friday	Venus	Guinea pig ပူး
Southwest	Sanay စနေ	Shani	Saturday	Saturn	Nāga နဂါး

== Variants ==
The Burmese calendar has a number of variants inside present-day Myanmar as well as outside. The variants outside Myanmar are still in use albeit under a different year numbering system.

=== Arakanese ===
According to Arakanese (Rakhine) tradition, the calendar was launched by King Thuriya Thehta of the Dhanyawaddy dynasty. At least down to the early 20th century, the Arakanese calendar used the Makaranta system although the Burmese calendar had moved to the Thandeikta system since the mid-19th century. In the Arakanese calendar, the month of Tagu gets the extra intercalary day in great leap years. Moreover, in Arakanese tradition, only the New Year's Day is observed. The Arakanese calendar under the name of Magi-San is still used by the Magh people of Bangladesh and Tripura in India.

=== Chulasakarat ===
The Burmese calendar first came to be adopted in present-day northern Thailand in the mid-13th century, and in central Thailand by the second half of the 16th century. Although then mainland kingdoms of Lan Na, Lan Xang, Siam, and later Cambodia adopted the Burmese epoch starting at 638 CE, each region retained its own traditions and/or introduced its own modifications afterwards. For example, the Kengtung, Lan Na, Lan Xang, and Sukhothai calendars still retained the use of numbering the months even though the Burmese calendar stopped using the numbered months alongside the month names. The use of numbering system may have predated the introduction of the Burmese calendar in any case since each region had its own numbering system. The first numbered month in Kengtung, Lan Na, Lan Xang and Sukhothai calendars is Tazaungmon (Karttika), Thadingyut (Asvina), (Nadaw) Margasirsha, and (Nadaw) Margasirsha, respectively. This means reading ancient texts and inscriptions in Thailand requires constant vigilance, not just in making sure one is correctly operating for the correct region, but also for variations within regions itself when incursions cause a variation in practice. (Note: The Sukhothai and Lan Xang numbering systems and the now abandoned Burmese numbering system are the same.)

Likewise, Cambodian and Thai systems have retained the practice of giving animal names to the years from a cycle of 12. The practice also existed in Burma in the Pagan period but later died out.

Moreover, Chulasakarat uses three similar but not identical types of lunar years used by the Burmese calendar. Each calendar has the same regular year of 354 days and a leap year of 384 days. However, whereas the Burmese calendar adds the intercalary day only in a leap cycle according to its Metonic cycle, the Siamese calendar adds the intercalary day to a regular year. The Siamese calendar does add the extra day in the same place (Jyestha/Nayon), however.

Calendar	Regular	Small leap year	Big leap year
Burmese	354	384	385
Chulasakarat	354	355	384

Lastly, the calculation methods also diverged in the mid-19th century when the Konbaung dynasty switched to the Thandeikta method, which is 0.56 second per year longer than the old system.

=== Dai ===
The traditional Dai calendar of Dai people of the Xishuangbanna in China is largely based on the Burmese calendar although it may have some Chinese influences.

== Current usage ==
=== Public holidays ===
The Burmese calendar is still used to determine a number of public holidays in Myanmar.

Event name	Burmese calendar date	International date
Full moon of Tabaung	Full moon of Tabaung	March–April
Burmese New Year Festival	Almost always in Tagu, sometimes in Kason	13–17 April
Buddha Day	Full moon of Kason	May–June
Start of Buddhist Lent	Full moon of Waso	June–July
End of Buddhist Lent	Full moon of Thadingyut	October–November
Tazaungdaing Festival	Full moon of Tazaungmon	November–December
National Day	10th waning of Tazaungmon	November–December

=== Date of birth ===
In Myanmar, people may register their date of birth in a Gregorian or Burmese calendar format.

=== Official formats ===
The Burmese language versions of official pronouncements by the government such as laws, notifications, documents are dated in both Burmese and Western (Gregorian) forms. The Burmese calendar date comes first, and is followed by the equivalent Gregorian calendar date in parentheses, both in the Year-Month-Day order. For example, the date of 29 March 2017 is written as:

၁၃၇၈ ခုနှစ်၊ နှောင်းတန်ခူးလဆန်း ၂ ရက်
(၂၀၁၇ ခုနှစ်၊ မတ်လ ၂၉ ရက်)

== See also ==
- Chula Sakarat
- Buddhist calendar
- Burmese zodiac

== Bibliography ==
- Aung-Thwin, Michael (2005). The mists of Rāmañña: The Legend that was Lower Burma (illustrated ed.). Honolulu: University of Hawai'i Press. ISBN 9780824828868.
- Chatterjee, S.K. (1998). "Traditional Calendar of Myanmar (Burma)". Indian Journal of History of Science. 33 (2): 143–160.
- Clancy, J.C. (January 1906). T. Lewis; H.P. Hollis (eds.). "The Burmese Calendar: A Monthly Review of Astronomy". The Observatory. XXIX (366).
- Eade, J.C. (1989). Southeast Asian Ephemeris: Solar and Planetary Positions, A.D. 638–2000. Ithaca: Cornell University. ISBN 978-0-87727-704-0.
- Eade, J.C. (1995). The Calendrical Systems of Mainland South-East Asia (illustrated ed.). Brill. ISBN 9789004104372.
- Hall, D.G.E. (1960). Burma (3rd ed.). Hutchinson University Library. ISBN 978-1-4067-3503-1.
- Htin Aung, Maung (1959). Folk Elements in Burmese Buddhism. Rangoon: Department of Religious Affairs.
- Htin Aung, Maung (1967). A History of Burma. New York and London: Cambridge University Press.
- Htin Aung, Maung (1970). Burmese History before 1287: A Defence of the Chronicles. Oxford: The Asoka Society.
- Irwin, Sir Alfred Macdonald Bulteel (1909). The Burmese and Arakanese calendars. Rangoon: Hanthawaddy Printing Works.
- Kala, U (2006) [1724]. Maha Yazawin Gyi (in Burmese). Vol. 1–3 (4th printing ed.). Yangon: Ya-Pyei Publishing.
- Luce, G.H. (1970). Old Burma: Early Pagan. Vol. 2. Locust Valley, NY: Artibus Asiae and New York University.
- Ohashi, Yukio (2001). Alan K. L. Chan; Gregory K. Clancey; Hui-Chieh Loy (eds.). Historical Perspectives on East Asian Science, Technology, and Medicine (illustrated ed.). World Scientific. ISBN 9789971692599.
- Ohashi, Yukio (2007). "Astronomy in Mainland Southeast Asia". In H. Selin (ed.). Encyclopaedia of the History of Science, Technology, and Medicine in Non-Western Cultures (2, illustrated ed.). Springer. ISBN 9781402045592.
- Oriental Institute; East India Association (1900). The Imperial and Asiatic Quarterly Review and Oriental and Colonial Record. London and Working, England: Oriental Institute.
- Parise, Frank (2002). The Book of Calendars. Gorgias Press.
- Rong, Syamananda (1986). A History of Thailand (5 ed.). Chulalongkorn University.
- Royal Historians of Burma (1960) [c. 1680]. U Hla Tin (Hla Thamein) (ed.). Zatadawbon Yazawin. Historical Research Directorate of the Union of Burma.
- Simms, Peter; Sanda Simms (2001). The Kingdoms of Laos: Six Hundred Years of History (illustrated ed.). Psychology Press. ISBN 9780700715312.
- Smith, Ronald Bishop (1966). Siam; Or, the History of the Thais: From 1569 A.D. to 1824 A.D. Vol. 2. Decatur Press.
