= Karen New Year =

Public holiday in Myanmar

- Official name: ကညီနံၣ်ထီၣ်သီ ဖၠုံဏိင်းထင်းသင့်
- Observed by: Karen people
- Type: Cultural
- Observances: Raising of Karen National Flag, Karen Doe Dance Competition
- 2025 date: December 19
- Frequency: Annual

The Karen New Year (S'gaw Karen: ကညီနံၣ်ထီၣ်သီ, Pwo Western Karen: ၦဖျိၩ့နံၪ့ထၪ့ၥၫ့, Pwo Eastern Karen: ပ်ုဖၠုံၮိင်းထင်းသင့်), also known as the Kayin New Year (Burmese: ကရင်နှစ်သစ်ကူး), is one of the major holidays celebrated by the Karen people. The Karen New Year falls on the first day of Pyatho, the tenth month in the Burmese calendar, and typically falls in December or January. The timing coincides with the completion of the Southeast Asian rice harvest in the lead-up to Pyatho. Celebrations typically include don dances and bamboo dances, singing, speeches, and the consumption of food and alcohol. The day is a gazetted public holiday in Myanmar.

== History ==
The Karen New Year was established in 1937 or 1938. The holiday was recognized by the British colonial administration as a public holiday in 1938. In 2017, the two Karen major liberation groups, leaders from the Karen National Liberation Army and the Karen National Union, jointly celebrated the Karen New Year for the first time since 1967 in Kayin State's Hlaingbwe Township.

== See also ==
- Karen people
- Public holidays in Kawthoolei
- Public holidays in Myanmar
