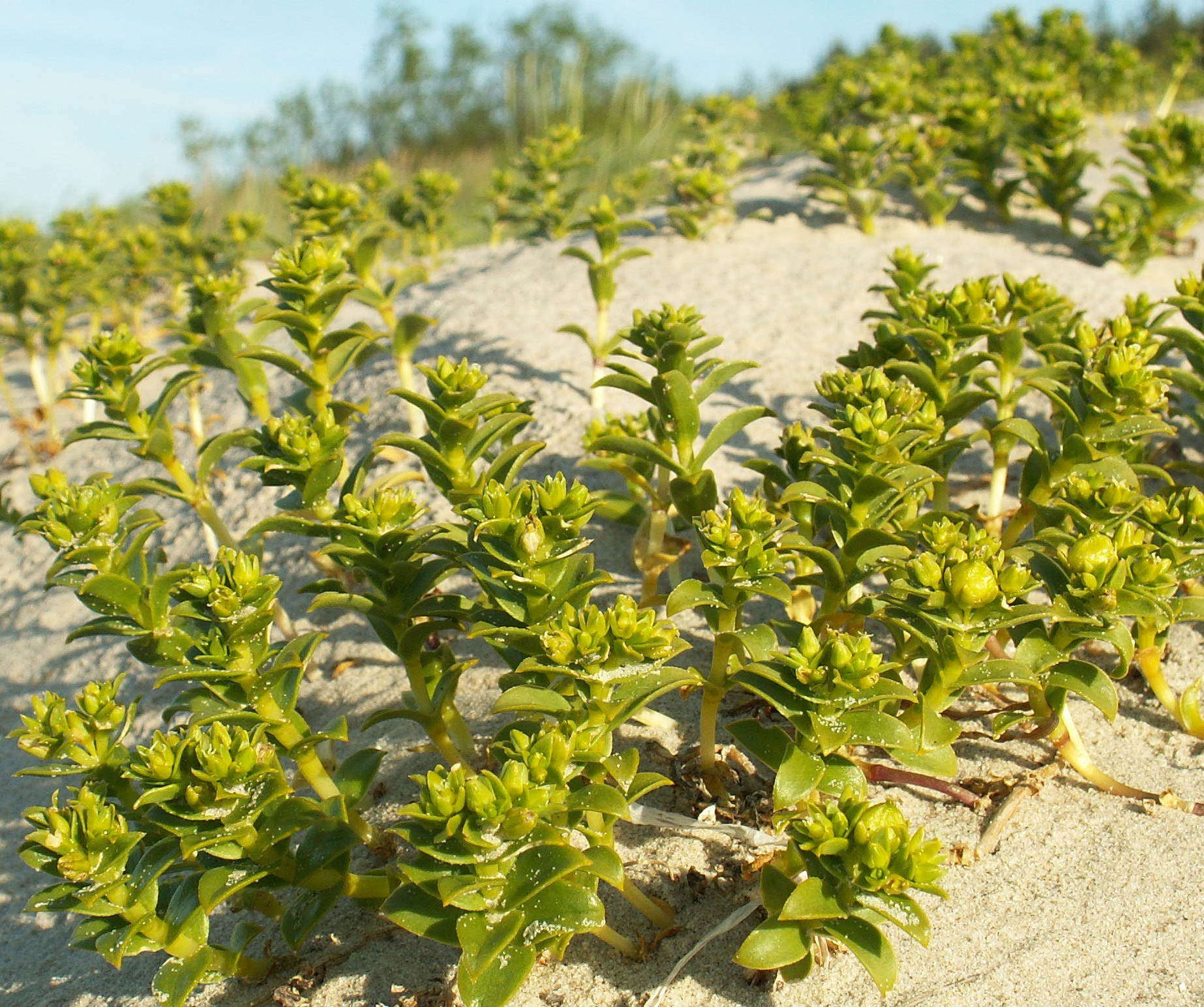

Scientific classification
- Kingdom: Plantae
- Clade: Embryophytes
- Clade: Tracheophytes
- Clade: Spermatophytes
- Clade: Angiosperms
- Clade: Eudicots
- Order: Caryophyllales
- Family: Caryophyllaceae
- Genus: Honckenya; Ehrh.
- Species: H. peploides

Binomial name
- Honckenya peploides (L.) Ehrh.

Synonyms
- List: Adenarium marinum Gray; Adenarium maritimum Raf.; Adenarium peploides Raf.; Alsine peploides Crantz; Ammodenia maritima (Raf.) E.P.Bicknell; Ammodenia peploides (L.) Rupr.; Ammodenia peploides var. diffusa (Hornem.) Porsild; Ammodenia peploides subsp. maritima (Raf.) W.Stone; Ammonalia peploides (L.) Desv.; Arenaria littoralis Salisb.; Arenaria peploides L.; Arenaria peploides var. diffusa Hornem.; Arenaria peploides f. lamoureuxii Lepage; Arenaria portulacea Lam.; Arenaria sitchensis D.Dietr.; Cerastium succulentum Crantz; Halianthus peploides Fr.; Holosteum succulentum L.; Honckenya diffusa (Hornem.) Á.Löve; Honckenya frigida Pobed.; Honckenya maritima (Raf.) Raf.; Honckenya peploides var. diffusa (Hornem.) Ostenf.; Honckenya peploides var. latifolia Fenzl; Merckia peploides G.Don; Minuartia peploides (L.) Hiern; Minuartia peploides var. diffusa Mattf.; Minuartia peploides subsp. latifolia (Fenzl) Mattf.; Minuartia peploides var. typica Mattf.

= Honckenya =

Genus of plants in the carnation family

Honckenya peploides, the sea sandwort (UK) or seaside sandplant (Canada), is the only species in the genus Honckenya of the plant family Caryophyllaceae. Other common names include sea chickweed, sea pimpernal, sea-beach sandwort, and sea purslane. The scientific name is often spelled "Honkenya", and is named after the German botanist Gerhard August Honckeny (or Honkeny). This plant has a circumboreal distribution.

The plant is a succulent perennial growing at the edge of the sea. It has small greenish white pentamerous flowers with 10 stamens in the male flowers borne in the leaf axils. The fruit capsule opens in three valves.

== Description ==
Honckenya peploides is a small, subdioecious, spreading plant, forming patches on sand and shingle above the high water mark of beaches. The stem is branching and buried in the sand. The leaves grow in opposite pairs and are fleshy with membranous margins, pale yellowish-green and ovate, oblong or lanceolate, usually with pointed tips. The flowers are often dioecious and have parts in fives. They grow in the upper leaf axils and have ovate to lanceolate sepals, greenish-white petals of about the same length, and three styles. The fruit is a capsule larger than the sepals and superficially resembling a pea. In pistillate flowers the stamens are undeveloped while in staminate flowers, the capsules are poorly developed.

There are two subspecies, H. p. peploides is the nominate subspecies with ovate to lanceolate leaves and flowers growing singly in the upper leaf axils, while H. p. major is coarser, has longer, more slender leaves, and the flowers are mostly in a multi-flowered cyme.

== Distribution ==
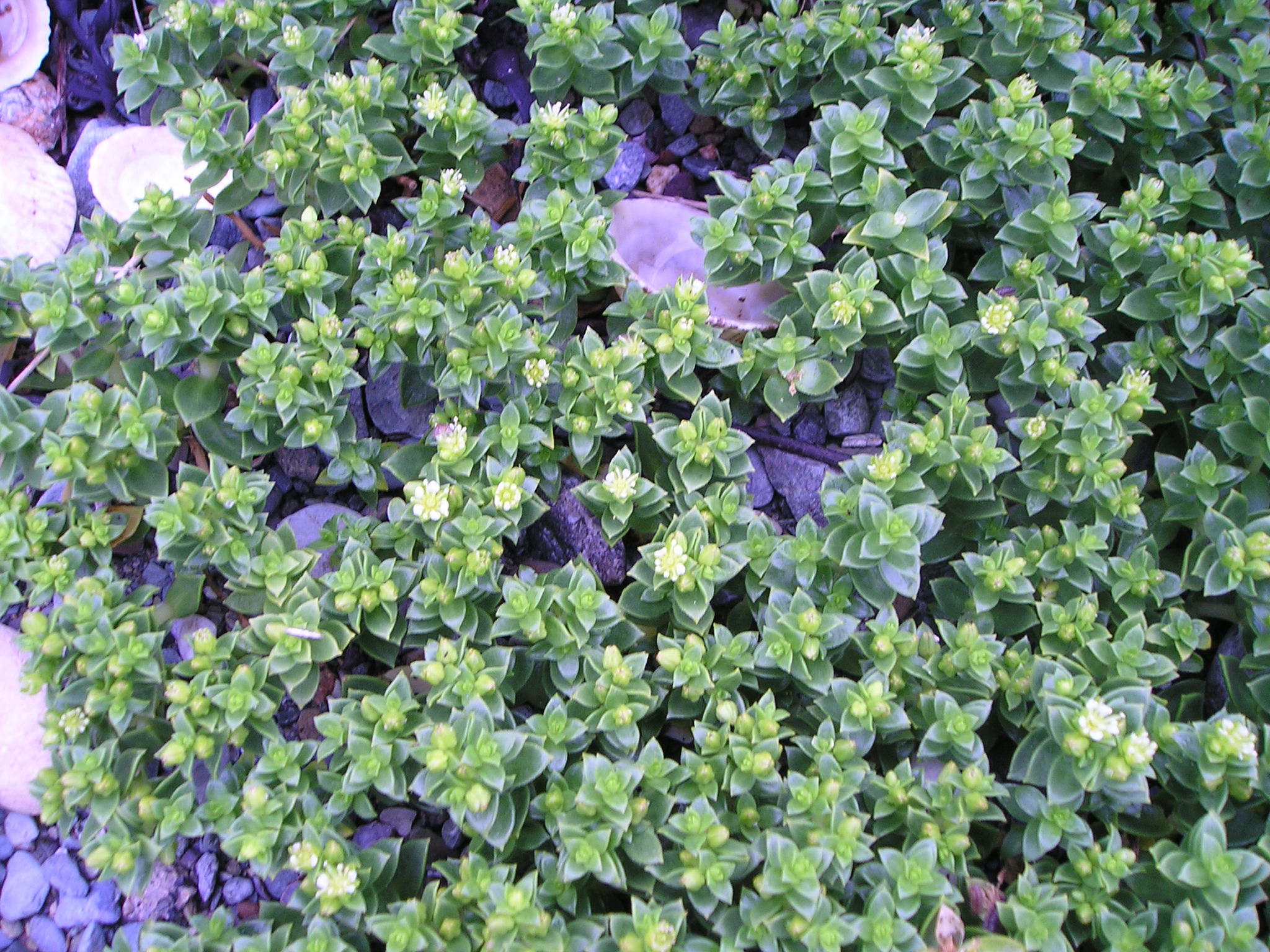
Sea sandwort on a beach in Anglesey

Honckenya peploides has a circum-boreal distribution in both temperate and arctic regions. It is found in coastal regions on sand, shingle and pebbles, in northern Europe (including Britain), northern Asia and North America.

== Research ==
Clumps of Honckenya peploides of one sex (with either staminate or pistillate flowers) may be separated by a few metres or hundreds of metres from clumps of the other sex. Researchers in Spain studied whether these clumps exhibited different ecophysiological traits which made them better adapted to different microhabitats. They found that shoots growing near the edge of the clumps had higher photosynthetic efficiency and chlorophyll content. Growth rates between clumps of the different sexes did not differ significantly from each other, and male plants continued to have reproductive costs associated with flowering after the female plants had ceased to flower and the seeds were ripening.

== Uses ==
Both the leaves and the seeds of H. peploides are used as food. The shoots and leaves are rich in vitamin A and vitamin C and can be used as a green leafy vegetable either raw or cooked. They can also be fermented to prepare a sauerkraut-like preserve, and in Iceland are fermented in whey to produce a drink. The seeds are small in size and time-consuming to gather; they can be ground up and added to flour or used as a garnish.
