= Pyatho =

Tenth month of the Burmese calendar

Pyatho (Burmese: ပြာသို) is the tenth month of the traditional Burmese calendar.

== Festivals and observances ==
- Karen New Year (first day of Pyatho)
- Royal equestrian festivals (မြင်းခင်းသဘင်ပွဲတော်)
- Pagoda festivals
  - Ananda Pagoda Festival, Bagan

== Pyatho symbols ==
- Flower: Clematis smilacifolia

== See also ==
- Burmese calendar
- Festivals of Burma
