= Mathematics and Computer Education =

- Discipline: Mathematics education; Computer science education
- Language: English
- Edited by: George M. Miller Jr.

Standard abbreviations
- ISO 4: Math. Comput. Educ.

Indexing
- CODEN: MCEDDA
- ISSN: 0730-8639
- LCCN: 82643159
- OCLC no.: 8075457

Mathematics and Computer Education was a peer-reviewed academic journal in the fields of mathematics and computer science education, published from 1982 to 2016. It was edited by George M. Miller Jr. of Nassau Community College.

It is the successor publication of the New York State Mathematics Newsletter for Two Year Colleges, first published by the New York State Mathematics Association of Two Year Colleges (NYSMATYC) in 1967, and renamed the NYSMATYC Journal in 1969 and the Mathematics Association of Two-Year Colleges Journal in 1970. In 1973, the NYSMATYC re-started another newsletter, separate from the journal.

== See also ==
- List of mathematics education journals
- Computer-based mathematics education
