= Tazaungmon =

Eighth month of the Burmese calendar

Tazaungmon (Burmese: တန်ဆောင်မုန်း; also spelt Tazaungmone) is the eighth month of the traditional Burmese calendar.

== Festivals and observances ==
- Kahtein (Thadingyut - Tazaungmon)
- Full moon of Tazaungmon
  - Tazaungdaing Festival of Lights (တန်ဆောင်တိုင်မီးထွန်းပွဲ)
    - Matho Thingan Robe Weaving Festival (Yangon)
  - Founding of Taungoo (16 October 1510)
  - Fire Balloon Festival (Taunggyi, Shan State)
  - Intha Day

== Tazaungmon symbols ==
- Flower: Luffa acutangula

== See also ==
- Burmese calendar
- Festivals of Burma
