= Wagaung =

Fifth month of the Burmese calendar

Wagaung (Burmese: ဝါခေါင်); formerly Nanka (Burmese: နံကာ) is the fifth month of the traditional Burmese calendar.

== Festivals and observances ==
- Taungbyone Nat Festival (တောင်ပြုန်းပွဲတော်)
- Maha Dok Festival (မဟာဒုတ်ပွဲတော်)

== Wagaung symbols ==
- Flower: Crinum amoenum

== See also ==
- Burmese calendar
- Festivals of Burma
- Vassa
