= Tawthalin =

Sixth month of the Burmese calendar

Tawthalin (Burmese: တော်သလင်း) is the sixth month of the traditional Burmese calendar.

== Festivals and events ==
- Boat Regatta Festival (လှေသဘင်ပွဲတော်)

== Tawthalin symbols ==
- Flower: Chukrasia velutina

== See also ==
- Burmese calendar
- Festivals of Burma
- Vassa
