= Gerhard August Honckeny =

German botanist (1724–1805)

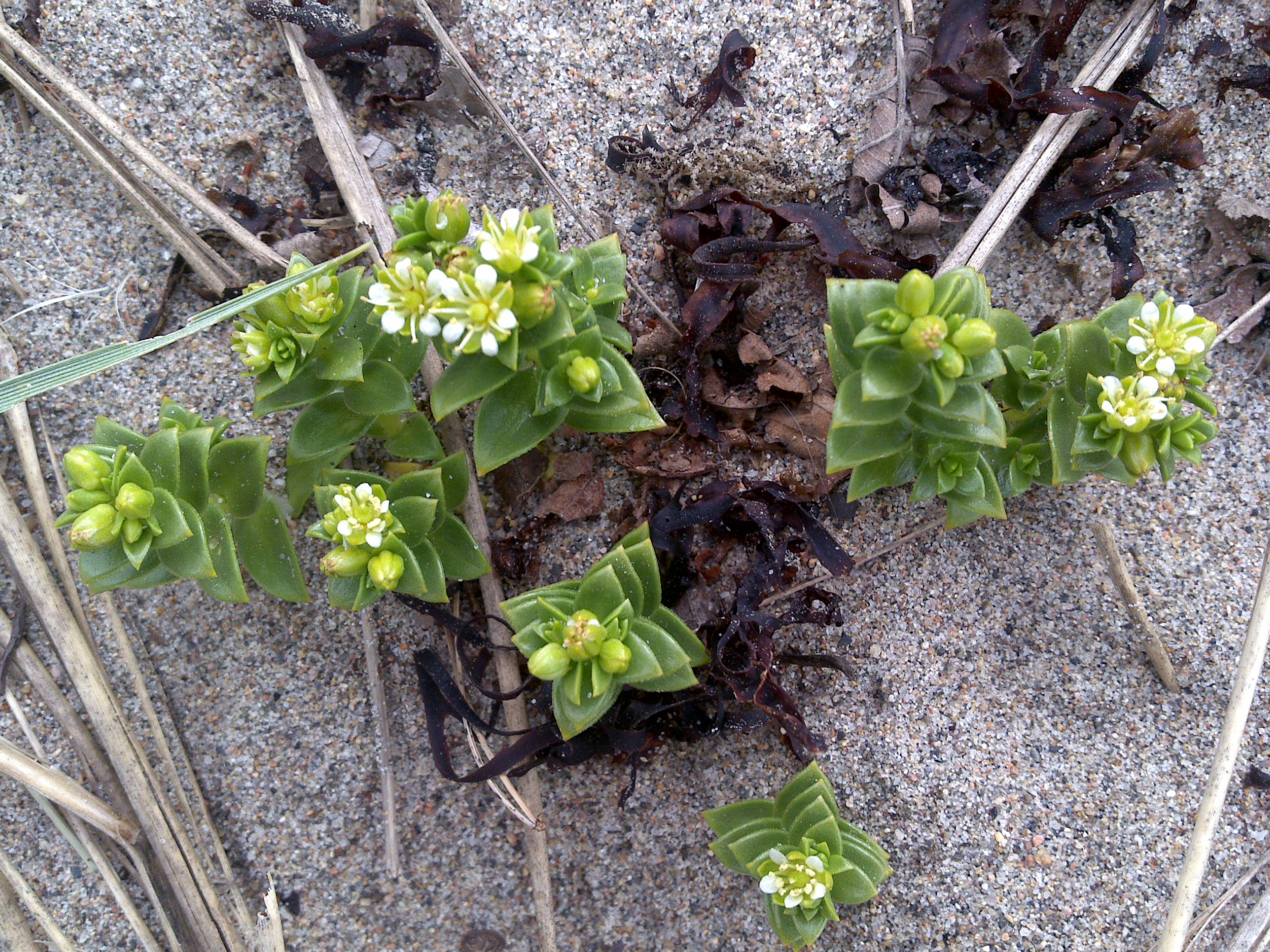
The sand-dwelling plant Honckenya is named after Honckeny.

Gerhard August Honckeny (also spelt Honkeny) (1724–1805) was a German botanist, and an Amtmann near Prenzlau. He is best known for his Synopsis Plantarum Germaniæ, and is referred to by the standard abbreviation Honck. in botanical works. He is commemorated in the genus name Honckenya.
