= Helaine Selin =

American librarian and author (born 1946)

Helaine Selin (born 1946) is an American librarian, historian of science, author and book editor.

== Career ==
Selin attended Binghamton University, where she earned her bachelor's degree. She received her MLS from SUNY Albany. She was a Peace Corps volunteer from the fall of 1967 through the summer of 1969 as a teacher of English and African History in Karonga, Malawi. She retired in 2012 from being the science librarian at Hampshire College.

Selin is known for being the editor of Encyclopaedia of the History of Science, Technology, and Medicine in Non-Western Cultures (1997, 2008 and third edition 2016) which is one of the first books which allows readers to "compare a variety of traditional systems of mathematics and cosmologies." Mathematics Across Cultures: The History of Non-Western Mathematics (2000), is considered by Mathematical Intelligencer as a companion to the Encyclopaedia of the History of Science, Technology, and Medicine in Non-Western Cultures. The journal, Mathematics and Computer Education, wrote that Mathematics Across Cultures filled a gap in the history of mathematics and was "an exciting collection of papers on ethnomathematics." Selin's editorial work, Nature Across Cultures: Views of Nature and the Environment in Non-Western Cultures (2003), was considered by Polylog to be a "valuable source for intercultural philosophers." Selin edited the Encyclopaedia of Classical Indian Sciences (2007). She has also edited several more books in the Science Across Cultures series: Medicine Across Cultures, Nature and the Environment Across Cultures, Childbirth Across Cultures, Parenting Across Cultures (second edition 2022), Happiness Across Cultures, Death Across Cultures and Aging Across Cultures.

== Work as an editor ==
- Encyclopaedia of the History of Science, Technology, and Medicine in Non-Western Cultures (1997)
- Astronomy Across Cultures: the history of non-Western astronomy (2000) (with Xiaochun Sun)
- Mathematics Across Cultures: the history of non-western mathematics (2000) (with Ubiratan D'Ambrosio)
- Medicine Across Cultures: history and practice of medicine in non-Western cultures (2003) (with Hugh Shapiro)
- Nature Across Cultures: views of nature and the environment in non-western cultures (2003) (with Arne Kalland)
- Encyclopaedia of classical Indian sciences (2007) (with Roddam Narasimha)
- Encyclopaedia of the History of Science, Technology, and Medicine in Non-Western Cultures 2nd ed. (2008) and 3rd ed. (2016)
- Childbirth across cultures: ideas and practices of pregnancy, childbirth and the postpartum (2009) (with Pamela Kendall Stone)
- Happiness across cultures: views of happiness and quality of life in non-Western cultures (2012) (with Gareth Davey)
- Parenting Across Cultures: Childrearing, Motherhood and Fatherhood in Non-Western Cultures (2014) and 2nd ed. (2022)
- Death Across Cultures: Death and Dying in Non-Western Cultures (2019) (with Robert Rakoff)
- Aging Across Cultures: Growing Old in the Non-Western World (2021)
- Childhood in Turkey: Educational, Sociological and Psychological Perspectives (2022) (with Hilal H. Sen)
- Happiness Across Cultures: Views of Happiness and Quality of Life in Non-Western Cultures. Second edition. (2024). Cham, Switzerland: Springer Nature.
