= Waso =

Fourth month of the Burmese calendar

Waso (Burmese: ဝါဆို; formerly Nweta (နွယ်တာ) or Myayta (Old Burmese: မ္လယ်တာ (မြေတာ)) is the fourth month of the traditional Burmese calendar.

== Festivals and observances ==
- Dhammacakka Day (ဓမ္မစကြာအခါတော်နေ့) - full moon of Waso
- Beginning of the Buddhist Lent (ဝါတွင်း)

== Waso symbols ==
- Flower: Jasminum grandiflorum

== See also ==
- Burmese calendar
- Festivals of Burma
- Vassa
