= Kason =

Second month of the Burmese calendar

Kason (Burmese: ကဆုန်; Mon: ပသာ်) is the second month of the traditional Burmese calendar.

== Festivals and observances ==
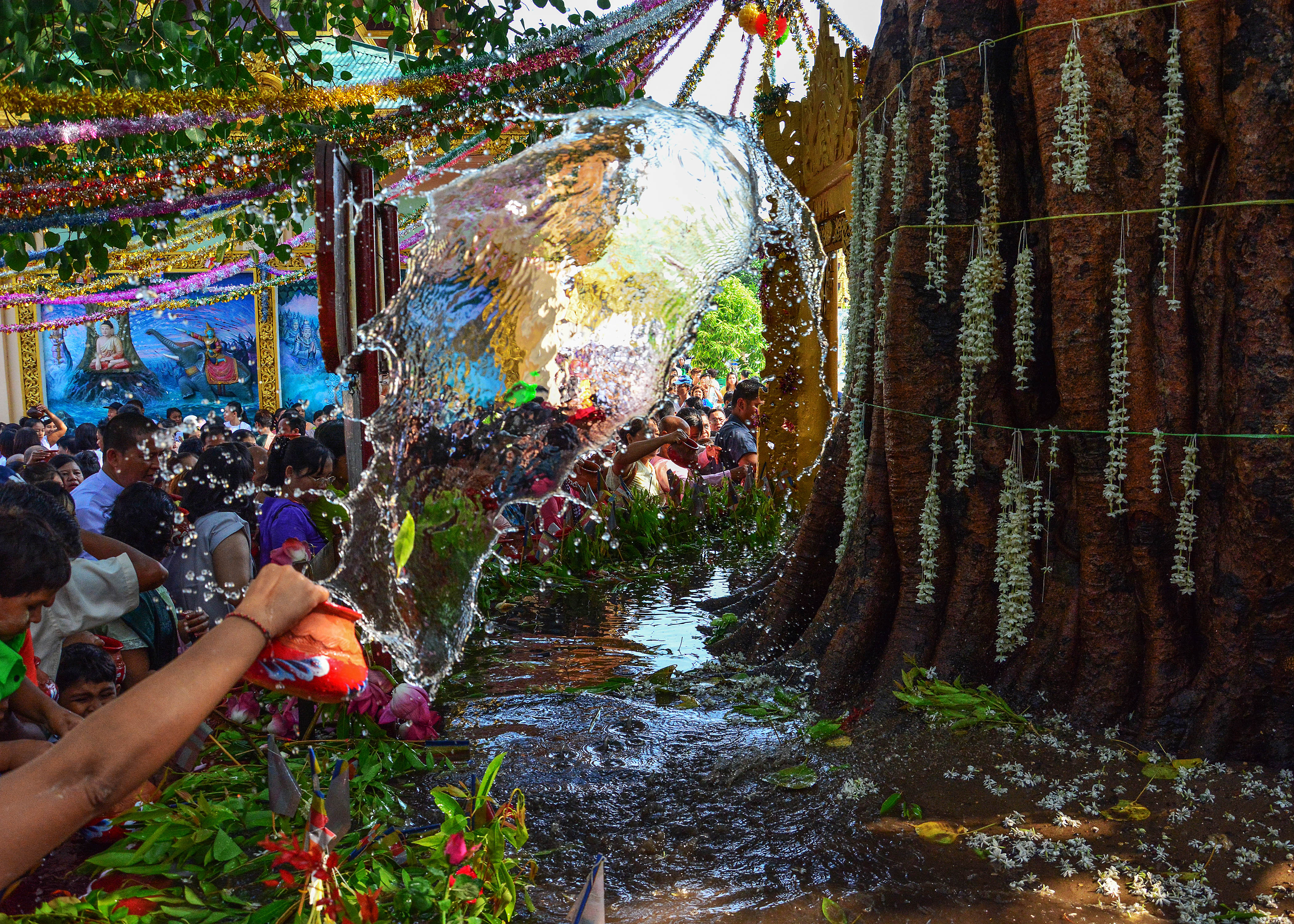
Buddhist devotees pour water on Bodhi trees on the full moon day of Kason.

- Full Moon of Kason (ကဆုန်လပြည့်နေ့)
  - Bodhi Tree Watering Festival (ညောင်ရေသွန်းပွဲ)

== Kason symbols ==
- Flower: Magnolia champaca

== See also ==
- Burmese calendar
- Festivals of Burma
