= Thadingyut =

Seventh month of the Burmese calendar

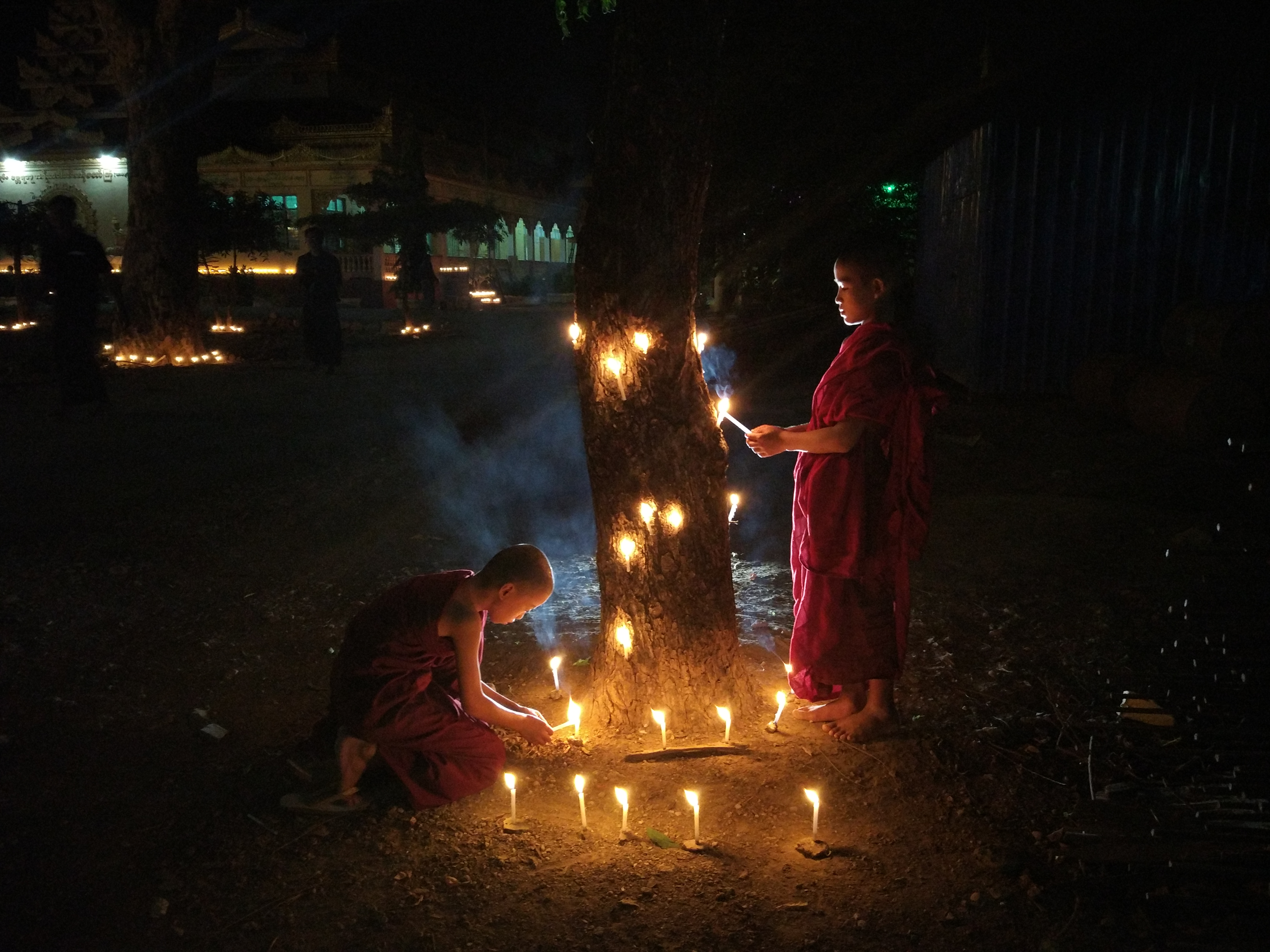
Thadingyut festival

Thadingyut (Burmese: သီတင်းကျွတ်, pronounced [ðədɪ́ɴd͡ʑʊʔ]) is the seventh month of the traditional Burmese calendar (which corresponds to 15 days in September and 15 days in October in the Gregorian calendar).
The Myanmar term "thadin" (သီတင်း) means the Buddhist Lent (Vassa), which spans the three preceding lunar months and is the tradition of Buddhist monks trying to avoid traveling as Buddha instructed them. The term "thadingyut" means the liberation from or the end of the Lent.

== Festivals and observances ==
- Full Moon of Thadingyut – end of the Buddhist lent
  - Abhidhamma Day
  - Festival of Lights (သတင်းကျွတ် မီးထွန်းပွဲ)
  - Yay Gyaw Festival (Pazundaung Township, Yangon)
- Pagoda festivals
  - Myathalun Pagoda Festival (Magwe Region)
  - Hpaung Daw U Pagoda Festival (Shan State)

== Thadingyut symbols ==
- Flower: Nelumbo nucifera

== See also ==
- Burmese calendar
- Festivals of Burma
- Kyaukse elephant dance festival
- Vassa
