= Encyclopaedia of the History of Science, Technology, and Medicine in Non-Western Cultures =

Encyclopaedia of the History of Science, Technology, and Medicine in Non-Western Cultures is an encyclopedia edited by Helaine Selin and published by Kluwer Academic Publishers in 1997, with a second edition in 2008, and third edition in 2016.

== Summary ==
From the Preface:

The purpose of the Encyclopaedia is to bring together knowledge of many disparate fields in one place to legitimize the study of other cultures' science... The Western academic divisions of science, technology and medicine have been united in the Encyclopaedia because in ancient cultures these disciplines were connected.

The first edition (1997) has 600 articles by a range of experts. The arrangement is alphabetical from "Abacus" to "Zu Chongzi". It includes an index from page 1079 to page 1117. K. V. Sarma contributed 35 articles, Greg De Young 13, Boris A. Rosenfeld 12, and Emilia Calvo and Ho Peng Yoke 11 each. Fabrizio Pregadio contributed 10 articles, Julio Samo wrote 9, and Richard Bertschinger, Radha Charan Gupta and David A. King wrote 8 each. Dozens of other contributors wrote fewer articles.

In 2008 the Encyclopaedia was split into two volumes and extended to 1000 articles for a second edition.

== Reviews ==
- Toby E. Huff (1999) Review: EHSTMNC, Isis 90(2):410,1 doi:10.1086/384409

"A splendid piece of joint scholarship, and some would say long overdue."
Huff counts nineteen entries on maps and map making, five on geometry, eleven on environment, four on city planning, five on east-west issues, six on colonialism, six on textile technology, ten on weights and measures

- Jensine Andresen (1999) Review: EHSTMNC, Zygon doi:10.1111/0591-2385.00218

Dispels the illusion that "members of non-Western cultures have offered only marginal contributions to the rigorous investigation of the natural world".
"Catalyzes a thorough reconsideration of the scope of the ideational nexus influencing the interaction between religion and science in the West."
Andresen characterizes the contributors an "iconoclastic bunch".

- Sujit Sivasundaram (2010) Review: EHSTMNC second edition, The British Journal for the History of Science doi:10.1017/S000708741000049X

"Turning points in the European historical narrative are being contextualized within other senses of chronology and space, and so decentralized from their mythic status as events in the birth of modern science."
The second edition shifts "from advocacy to analysis". The reviewer considers the term Non-Western to be outdated, particularly as ethnobotany regions proliferate, and Europe is excluded except as the colonizer.
