= 2025 in Myanmar =

- Decades: 2000s; 2010s; 2020s
- See also: Other events of 2025; History of Myanmar; Timeline

This is a list of important events that happened in Myanmar in 2025.

== Incumbents ==
- Acting President (On Duty): Min Aung Hlaing
- Chairman of State Security and Peace Commission: Min Aung Hlaing
- Viceman of State Security and Peace Commission: Soe win
- Chief Executive of National Defence and Security Council: Aung Lin Dwe
- Prime Minister: Min Aung Hlaing (until 31 July); Nyo Saw (since 31 July)

== Events ==
=== January ===
- 1 January –
  - The National Unity Government releases 169 prisoners to commemorate the new year.
  - The Arakan Army allows residents of Maungdaw who fled the town due to conflict to return to their homes after securing recommendation letters provided by AA administrators.
  - The junta passes a new cybersecurity law which criminalises unauthorised VPN usage and running of unsanctioned online gambling businesses.
- 4 January – The junta releases nearly 6,000 prisoners, including 600 political prisoners to commemorate Independence Day. Among them are Khet Aung, former Chief Minister of Kachin State and actors Thinzar Wint Kyaw and Nang Mwe San.
- 5 January – A new electricity distribution scheme is instituted. In Yangon, townships are divided into three groups with receiving eight hours of electricity daily through four two-hour period. In Mandalay, groups in every township receive six hours of electricity through two three-hour periods. In the rest of the country, each area receives six hours of electricity after six hours of outage.
- 8 January – At least 40 people are killed in a Tatmadaw airstrike on the village of Kyauk Ni Maw in Ramree Island, Rakhine State.
- 13 January – At least 12 people are killed in a landslide in Hpakant, Kachin State.
- 16 January – Nay Soe Maung, son-in-law of former military dictator Than Shwe, is sentenced to three years in prison for criticizing the junta.
- 20 January – China announces that it had brokered a ceasefire agreement between the junta and the Myanmar National Democratic Alliance Army (MNDAA).
- 26 January – The Kachin Independence Army (KIA) and the People's Defence Force (PDF) capture Bhamo Airport and the Tatmadaw Armored Battalion 7006 base.

=== February ===
- 5 February – The Thai government stops the supply of electricity to several Burmese towns along the border with Thailand that are known to host scam operations.
- 14 February –
  - A court in Argentina, acting on a petition from the Burmese Rohingya Organisation UK and citing the principle of universal jurisdiction, issues arrest warrants against junta leader Min Aung Hlaing, former president Htin Kyaw, and former state counsellor Aung San Suu Kyi on charges of "genocide and crimes against humanity" against the Rohingyas.
  - Father Donald Martin Ye Naing Win, a Catholic priest based in Shwebo Township, Sagaing Region, is fatally stabbed by rebels in a church compound in Kan Gyi Taw village, in what is believed to be the first targeted killing of Catholic clergy in the Myanmar civil war (2021–present).

=== March ===
- 2 March – Myanmar – A bus falls into a ravine in Shan State, killing five people and injuring 25 others.
- 4 March – A Buddhist monk accused of collaborating with the Tatmadaw is killed along with a disciple by resistance groups at a monastery in Pekon Township, Shan State.
- 14 March –
  - At least 27 people are reported to have been killed in a Tatmadaw airstrike in Let Pan Hla village in Singu Township, Mandalay Division.
  - The World Food Programme announces food aid cuts for over 1 million people in Myanmar due to funding shortages.
- 18 March — Ataullah abu Ammar Jununi, the leader of the Arakan Rohingya Salvation Army, is arrested in Bangladesh.
- 28 March — A magnitude 7.7 earthquake hits near Mandalay, killing at least 3,770 people.

=== April ===
- 17 April – The junta grants amnesty to 4,900 prisoners in commemoration of Thingyan.
- 22 April – The Tatmadaw retakes Lashio following the MNDAA's withdrawal. Covert pressure from the Chinese government is believed to have influenced the group's decision to withdraw.
- 23 April – Five people are killed in a Tatmadaw airstrike near Tabayin.

=== May ===
- 6 May – The United States imposes sanctions on the Karen National Army, its leader Saw Chit Thu and his sons, Saw Htoo Eh Moo and Saw Chit Chit for involvement in cybercrime.
- 10 May – Junta leader Min Aung Hlaing meets with Chinese leader Xi Jinping for the first time since the 2021 Myanmar coup d'état.
- 12 May – At least 22 people are killed in a Tatmadaw airstrike on a school in the village of Ohe Htein Twin in Tabayin Township, Sagaing Region.
- 17 May – A magnitude 5.2 earthquake hits Mandalay Region, killing two people.
- 20 May – A military transport helicopter crashes in disputed circumstances in Kachin State.
- 22 May – Cho Tun Aung, a retired military officer and former ambassador to Cambodia, is shot dead near his residence in Mayangon Township, Yangon. A group calling itself the Golden Valley Warriors claims responsibility.

=== June ===
- 4 June – US President Donald Trump issues a proclamation barring Myanmar nationals from entering the United States.
- 10 June – A Tatmadaw FTC-2000G fighter jet crashes in disputed circumstances in Sagaing Region.
- 30 June – The Central Bank of Myanmar blacklists 197 export companies and their directors due to their failure to repatriate export earnings, including a firm owned by families of Karen National Army leader Saw Chit Thu.

=== July ===
- 1 July – A Tatmadaw fighter jet disappears in disputed circumstances near Hpasawng Township, Kayah State.
- 2 July – Myanmar officially notifies Malaysia, the 2025 ASEAN chair, of its opposition to Timor-Leste joining the bloc in October 2025, amid Timor-Leste reportedly supporting anti-junta forces in the ongoing civil war.
- 3 July – The Tatmadaw regains control of Mobye town in Pekon Township, Shan State, which had been held by Karenni rebels since 2023.
- 7 July – US President Donald Trump announces plans to impose a 40% tariff on Myanmar's exports.
- 11 July – At least 23 people are killed in a Tatmadaw airstrike on a Buddhist monastery in Lin Ta Lu, Sagaing Township.
- 16 July –
  - A magnitude 4.7 earthquake hits Mandalay Region, killing one person from shock.
  - The Tatmadaw claims to have retaken Nawnghkio, which had been held by the Ta'ang National Liberation Army (TNLA) since July 2024.
- 30 July – The junta passes a new electoral code that includes imposing the death penalty for grave violations.
- 31 July –
  - The junta lifts the nationwide state of emergency that it had imposed since its 2021 coup. It also announces the dissolution of State Administration Council and the appointment of General Nyo Saw as prime minister, while junta leader Min Aung Hlaing is retained as acting president.
  - The National Defence and Security Council announces a state of emergency and martial law in 63 townships of nine states and regions.

=== August ===
- 2 August – At least 13 people are killed in a Tatmadaw airstrike in Mogok.
- 12 August – Five Bangladeshi fishermen are abducted by the Arakan Army from the Naf River estuary along the Bangladesh–Myanmar border.
- 14 August – At least 21 people are killed in a Tatmadaw airstrike in Mogok.
- 16 August – The Union Election Commission (UEC) announces designated electoral constituencies for the 2025 general election with mixed-member proportional representation system for the Amyotha Hluttaw and the State/Regions Hluttaw, and the 330-seat Pyithu Hluttaw through a first-past-the-post system.
- 18 August – The UEC announces that the first phase of the 2025 general election will take place on 28 December.
- 20 August – The Tatmadaw retakes the town of Demoso in Kayah State, which had been held by the KNDF since 2023.
- 25 August – At least 12 people are killed while 20 others are injured by a Tatmadaw airstrike on the Daing Kyi quarter of Mrauk U.
- 28 August – The junta designates the Karen National Union as a terrorist group and unlawful association.

=== September ===
- 9 September – The UEC announces the dissolution of four political parties, including the National Democratic Force, a major political party which included breakaways from the National League for Democracy, for insufficient number of members and office branches.
- 10 September – A court in Taunggyi issues the first conviction for violating the new electoral code and sentences a man to seven years' hard labor for undermining elections by criticizing election-related matters on Facebook.
- 12 September – At least 18 people are killed in a Tatmadaw airstrike on two schools on the village of Thayet Thapin in Kyauktaw Township, Rakhine State.
- 29 September – A court in China sentences 11 members of the Ming crime family to death for running various criminal activities in the Myanmar border town of Laukkai and sentences 28 others to prison sentences reaching up to life imprisonment.

=== October ===
- 1 October – Justice for Myanmar is awarded the Right Livelihood Award for its role in "exposing and eroding the international support" to the Tatmadaw.
- 2 October – The Tatmadaw claims to have retaken the town of Kyaukme, which was seized by the TNLA in August 2024.
- 6 October – At least 24 people are killed in a Tatmadaw airstrike on a religious gathering in Chaung-U Township, Sagaing Region.
- 20 October – The Tatmadaw raids the KK Park scam center in Myawaddy Township, Kayin State along the Myanmar–Thailand border, resulting in 2,198 arrests.
- 29 October – The TNLA signs a ceasefire agreement with the Tatmadaw following negotiations mediated by China.

=== November ===
- 4 November – A court in China sentences seven members of the Bai crime family to death for running various criminal activities in the Myanmar border town of Laukkai and sentences 14 others to prison sentences reaching up to life imprisonment.
- 18 November — The Tatmadaw raids the Shwe Kokko scam centre, resulting in 346 arrests.
- 26 November — The State Security and Peace Commission issues pardons to 3,085 political prisoners and drops charges against 5,580 others.
- 28 November — Belarusian president Alexander Lukashenko undertakes a state visit to Myanmar.

=== December ===
- 5 December – At least 18 people are killed in a Tatmadaw airstrike on a tea shop in the village of Mayakan in Tabayin Township, Sagaing Region.
- 9—20 December — Myanmar at the 2025 SEA Games
- 10 December –
  - The opposition General Strike Coordination Body stages a "silent strike" by calling on citizens to stay indoors as part of efforts to boycott the 2025–26 Myanmar general election.
  - At least 34 people are killed in a Tatmadaw airstrike on a hospital in Mrauk-U Township, Rakhine State.
- 28 December – 2025 Myanmar general election (first phase)

== Ongoing ==
- Myanmar civil war (2021–present)

== Holidays ==
- 1 January – New Year's Day
- 4 January – Independence Day
- 12 February – Union Day
- 2 March – Peasants' Day
- 24 March – Full Moon Day of Tabaung
- 27 March – Armed Forces Day
- 13 April – Myanmar New Year
- 1 May – Labour Day
- 22 May – Full Moon Day of Kason
- 6 June – Eid al-Adha
- 9 July – Full Moon Day of Waso
- 19 July – Martyrs' Day
- 16–18 October – Full Moon Day of Thadingyut
- 14–15 November – Full moon day of Tazaungmon
- 25 November – National Day
- 25 December – Christmas Day

== Deaths ==
- 22 May – Cho Tun Aung, retired army general and diplomat (b. 1968)
- 10 July
  - Maung Thar Cho, writer, academic, professor and politician (b. 1958)
  - Shwe Nya War Sayadaw, Buddhist monk and former political prisoner (b. 1965)
- 7 August – Myint Swe, retired army general and acting president of Myanmar (b.1951)
- 18 August – Abraham Than, 97, Roman Catholic prelate, auxiliary bishop (1968–1972) and bishop (1972–2001) of Kengtung.
