= 2024 in Myanmar =

- Decades: 2000s; 2010s; 2020s
- See also: Other events of 2024; History of Myanmar; Timeline

This is the list of important events happened in Myanmar in 2024.

== Incumbents ==
| Photo | Post | Name |
|---|---|---|
| | Acting President | Min Aung Hlaing (acting president, since 22 July) |
| | Chairman of the State Administration Council; Prime Minister | Min Aung Hlaing (acting president, since 22 July) |
| | Vice Chairman of the State Administration Council; Deputy Prime Minister | Soe Win |
| | First Vice President | Myint Swe (acting president, until 22 July) |
| | Second Vice President | Henry Van Thio (until 22 April) |
| | Deputy Prime Minister | Mya Tun Oo |
| | Deputy Prime Minister | Tin Aung San |
| | Deputy Prime Minister | Win Shein |

== Ongoing ==
- Myanmar civil war (2021–present)

== Events ==
=== January ===
- 4 January – The junta announces the pardon of 9,652 prisoners, including 114 foreigners, to mark the country's independence day.
- 5 January – Operation 1027:
  - Battle of Laukkai: The MNDAA gain full control of Laukkai, capital of the Kokang Self-Administered Zone following the mass surrender of thousands of Tatmadaw forces, officials and their families within the city. Among those who surrender are 228 officers, including six brigadier generals. UWSA forces seize Hopang, the capital of the Wa Self-Administered Division, on the same day.
- 7 January – Operation 1027: The Three Brotherhood Alliance claims that it had captured the towns of Kutkai and Theinni at midnight after seizing Tatmadaw posts in the area, including the headquarters of the 16th Military Operations Command in Theinni.
- 12 January –
  - A Chinese mediated dialogue held in Kunming results in a formal ceasefire between the junta and the Three Brotherhood Alliance.
  - Tatmadaw airstrikes kill at least 17 people, including nine children, and injure 20 others in Kanan village, Sagaing.
- 14 January – The Arakan Army seizes the township of Paletwa in Chin State which borders Bangladesh.
- 15 January – Operation 1027: The Arakan Army captures the town of Paletwa in Chin State following fighting since November 13, 2023.

=== February ===
- 9 February – At least 340 members of Myanmar's Border Guard Police flee into neighboring Bangladesh and are disarmed and detained by Border Guard Bangladesh in the past week amidst continued fighting against the Arakan Army.
- 11 February – The junta announces that all men aged 18 to 35 and all women aged 18 to 27 will be required to complete two years of mandatory military service, amid territorial losses to anti-junta forces in the ongoing civil war.
- 13 February – The Arakan Army claims to have sunk three junta ships travelling on the Kaladan River in Rakhine State, resulting in up to 900 deaths. The sinking is one of the largest losses in the navy's history.
- 20 February – The Pa-O National Liberation Army claims that shelling by the Tatmadaw killed seven refugees in Hsi Hseng.
- 29 February - An Indian delegation led by MP K. Vanlalvena meets with Arakan Army officials to discuss the possibility of constructing a road linking Paletwa with the Indian border, which would form part of the Kaladan Multi-Modal Transit Transport Project.

=== March ===
- 7 March –
  - The Kachin Independence Army launches a major offensive against junta outposts near Laiza and on the highway between Bhamo and Myitkyina. Five outposts are seized, and fighting breaks out at five others.
  - Local PDF groups capture the town of Kani, in Sagaing Region.
- 28 March – Operation 0307: The Kachin Independence Army captures the town of Lweje and its nearby border crossings in Kachin State, Myanmar, after Tatmadaw forces abandon their posts and flee across the border into China.

=== April ===
- 4 April – The National Unity Government of Myanmar launches an air attack involving 29 drones on junta targets in the capital Naypyidaw.
- 6 April – Operation 1111: The Karen National Union captures the town of Myawaddy in Kayin State, on the border with Thailand, as hundreds of junta troops surrender and hand over their weapons to rebel forces.
- 11 April –
  - The Karen National Union, local PDF groups, and other Karenni organizations seize the town of Myawaddy on the Thai border from the Tatmadaw after three days of fighting. Over 1,000 refugees flee into Thailand after junta planes bomb the town following its capture.
- 16 April – The junta announces that deposed State Counsellor Aung San Suu Kyi and president Win Myint have been transferred to house arrest due to a heat wave.
- 22 April – Vice President Henry Van Thio resigns due to unspecified health reasons.

=== May ===
- 5 May – The Kachin Independence Army announces the capture of the town of Sumprabum.
- 6 May – The Arakan Army announces the capture of a junta base in Buthidaung after a siege.
- 18 May – The Arakan Army announces the capture of Buthidaung, with unconfirmed reports of the town being set on fire.
- 29 May – The Tatmadaw is accused of massacring 76 people in the village of Byine Phyu, Rakhine State.

=== June ===
- 1 June –
  - Tin Oo, the Tatmadaw's former Commander-in-Chief and co-founder of the National League for Democracy dies at the age of 97.
- 19 June – The abbot of Win Neinmitayon Monastery is shot dead in Mandalay Region. A monk witnessing the event testifies that the act was committed by junta soldiers, prompting a boycott by monks in 21 townships of donations from military personnel and families.
- 25 June – The second phase of Operation 1027 commences with the resumption of military operations by the Ta'ang National Liberation Army in northern Shan State.
- 28 June – Former President Thein Sein attends a ceremony celebrating the 70th Anniversary of the Five Principles of Peaceful Coexistence and meets with Chinese Foreign Minister Wang Yi in a separate session.

=== July ===
- 2 July – Thousands of residents are stranded in homes across northern Myanmar due to flooding.
- 7 July – The Arakan Army seizes control of Thandwe Airport in Rakhine State from the Tatmadaw.
- 10 July – The Ta'ang National Liberation Army announces the capture of the town of Nawnghkio in Shan State from the Tatmadaw.
- 22 July – Min Aung Hlaing, the Chairman of the State Administration Council, is named acting president after Myint Swe goes on medical leave.
- 25 July – The junta and the MNDAA both claim to have captured Lashio, which houses a major Tatmadaw garrison, and Mogok, the center of the country's gem-mining industry.

=== August ===
- 2 August:
  - The MNDAA claims to have captured the headquarters of the Tatmadaw's Northeast Command in Lashio.
  - A Eurocopter AS365 Dauphin of the Myanmar Air Force crashes in Hmawbi Township, killing two occupants including Air Force Major General Soe Tin Latt and injuring two others.
- 5 August – At least 150 Rohingyas are killed while trying to flee to Bangladesh following an artillery and drone attack in Maungdaw that is blamed on the Arakan Army.
- 21 August – Two freelance journalists are killed in a raid on one of the victims' residences by the Tatmadaw in Kyaikto, Mon State.
- 28 August:
  - The Tatmadaw launches a major counteroffensive against rebels in Kachin State, following the fall of Momauk to the Kachin Independence Army.
  - A UN official says that the Arakan Army has begun indiscriminately attacking the Muslim Rohingyas after capturing much of Rakhine State, forcing thousands of people to flee. The rebel group is reportedly "rounding up groups" of Rohingya men and shelling Rohingya villages.

=== September ===
- 2 September – The Tatmadaw designates the MNDAA, the Ta'ang National Liberation Army and the Arakan Army as "terrorist" groups.
- 5 September – The Arakan Army captures the Myanmar Navy's Central Naval Diving and Salvage Depot in Thandwe, Rakhine State.
- 13 September – At least 300 people are reported killed and around 230,000 others are displaced following days of nationwide flooding caused by the remnants of Typhoon Yagi.
- 17 September – Senior-General Min Aung Hlaing announces that the national census would be taken beginning from 1 October and urges flood victims to return to their homes as soon as possible.
- 18 September – The MNDAA announces that it would not cooperate with the National Unity Government and that it does not harbor any intention to capture Mandalay and Taunggyi.
- 20 September – The junta orders students enrolled in short-term courses in Thailand to return to Myanmar in order to renew their passport.
- 24 September – Pope Francis asks for the release of detained former leader Aung San Suu Kyi and offers her sanctuary at the Vatican.
- 26 September–
  - A Tatmadaw airstrike on Thandwe kills 14 people and injures at least 25, according to the Arakan Army.
  - Senior-General Min Aung Hlaing asks the People's Defence Forces and ethnic rebel groups to lay down their arms, enter the legal fold and participate in party politics. The National Unity Government rejects the offer.
- 28 September –
  - The Japanese government announces that it will not replace its ambassador Ichiro Maruyama, who was recalled on 27 September and that charge d'affaires ad interim Shogo Yoshitake would continue to manage the diplomatic relations with the junta.
- 29 September – Khin Shwe, who was detained along with his son Zay Thiha in March 2022, is released for health reasons.

=== October ===
- 1 October – The national census commences.
- 10 October – The Myanmar Navy opens fire at Bangladeshi fishing trawlers near St. Martin's Island, killing a fisherman. It subsequently detains six of the vessels along with their crew.
- 18 October – The Chinese consulate in Mandalay is damaged in a bomb attack.
- 20 October – A boat carrying refugees fleeing from Kyauk Kar to Myeik capsizes in the Andaman Sea, killing at least eight people and leaving 20-30 others missing.
- 23 October – Nay Soe Maung, the former rector of the University of Public Health, Yangon and son-in-law of former military ruler Than Shwe, is arrested after criticising the military regime on social media.
- 30 October – The European Union, the United Kingdom and Canada impose sanctions on six entities and three individuals, including Industry Minister Charlie Than, for their role in supplying aviation fuel and equipment to the Tatmadaw.

=== November ===
- 9 November - South Korea government starts giving out visas to passports authorized by National Unity Government.
- 18 November - A leak reveals that MNDAA leader Peng Daxun was placed under house arrest in Kunming after travelling there for health reasons in late October.
- 25 November - The Royal Thai Army demands that the United Wa State Army remove nine outposts along the Thai-Myanmar border by 18 December.
- 26 November – The Kachin Independence Army is reported to have taken the mining town of Kanpaikti, which lies along the border with China.
- 27 November - The Chief Prosecutor of International Criminal Court says he had requested an arrest warrant for Myanmar's leader, Senior-General Min Aung Hlaing.
- 30 November - Myanmar Navy patrol boats shoot at two Thai fishing vessels, killing one fisherman and arresting of 31 others including four Thai nationals and 27 Myanmar nationals.

=== December ===
- 3 December – The MNDAA declares a unilateral ceasefire and calls for dialogue with the junta brokered by China.
- 8 December – The Arakan Army seizes Maungdaw from the Tatmadaw.
- 15 December - Representatives from MNDAA and junta meet in Kunming to discuss terms for ceasefire. The meeting lasts two days but is inconclusive due to the latter's demand that the MNDAA relinquish its hold over Lashio.
- 20 December – The Arakan Army seizes the headquarters of the Tatmadaw's western regional military headquarters in Ann Township, Rakhine State.
- 28 December - The Arakan Army captures Gwa in southern Rakhine State.
- 29 December - The Arakan Army announces that they would welcome any initiative to solve the current crisis through dialogue.

== Holidays ==
- 1 January – New Year's Day
- 4 January – Independence Day
- 12 February – Union Day
- 2 March – Peasants' Day
- 24 March – Full Moon Day of Tabaung
- 27 March – Armed Forces Day
- 13 April – Myanmar New Year
- 1 May – Labour Day
- 22 May – Full Moon Day of Kason
- 16 June – Eid al-Adha
- 19 July – Martyrs' Day
- 20 July – Full Moon Day of Waso
- 16–18 October – Full Moon Day of Thadingyut
- 14–15 November – Full moon day of Tazaungmon
- 25 November – National Day
- 25 December – Christmas Day

== Deaths ==
- 8 January – Mar Mar Aye (b. 1942), singer and actress.
- 1 June – Tin Oo (b. 1927), minister of defence (1974–1977), commander-in-chief of defence services (1974–1976) and cofounder of the National League for Democracy.
- 17 July – Sai Hsai Mao (b. 1948), singer.
- 19 August – Pe Maung Same (b. 1974), film director and son of cartoonist U Pe Thein.
- 7 October – Zaw Myint Maung (b. 1951), political prisoner, chief minister of Mandalay Region (2016–2021) and member of the Pyithu Hluttaw (2012–2016).
