= 2026 in Myanmar =

- Decades: 2000s; 2010s; 2020s
- See also: Other events of 2026; History of Myanmar; Timeline

This is a list of important events that set to happen in Myanmar in 2026.

== Incumbent ==
- President - Min Aung Hlaing
- Vice-President 1 - Nyo Saw
- Vice-President 2 - Nan Ni Ni Aye
- Speaker of the Amyotha Hluttaw - Aung Lin Dwe
- Speaker of the Pyithu Hluttaw - Khin Yi

== Events ==
=== Ongoing ===
- Myanmar civil war (2021–present)

=== January ===
- 4 January – The junta issues pardons for 6,134 prisoners to mark 78 years of independence from the United Kingdom.
- 11 January – 2025–26 Myanmar general election (second phase)
- 22 January – At least 21 people are killed in a Tatmadaw airstrike on the village of Hteelin in Bhamo Township, Kachin State.
- 25 January – 2025–26 Myanmar general election (third phase)
- 29 January – China executes 11 members of the Ming crime family that ran scam centres in Laukkai.

=== February ===
- 2 February – China executes four members of the Bai crime family that ran scam centres in Laukkai.
- 3 February –
  - Myanmar and Russia sign a five-year military cooperation agreement.
  - A magnitude 6.0 earthquake hits Rakhine State.
- 13 February – Myanmar expels East Timorese charge d’affaires Elisio do Rosario de Sousa in response to investigations in Timor-Leste against the junta for war crimes and crimes against humanity.
- 19 February – Bo Nagar, a leader of the Burma National Revolutionary Army (BNRA), surrenders to the Tatmadaw in Sagaing Region.
- 24 February – At least 17 people are killed in a Tatmadaw airstrike on the village of Yoengu in Ponnagyun Township, Rakhine State.

=== March ===
- 1 March – At least 25 people are killed in a Tatmadaw airstrike on a trading post in the village of Pyaung in Mindon Township, Magway Region.
- 2 March – The junta issues an amnesty for more than 7,300 prisoners convicted on terrorism-related charges.
- 4 March – The United Kingdom suspends the issuance of student visas to Burmese nationals as part of efforts to reduce asylum requests.
- 7 March – At least 30 people are killed in a Tatmadaw offensive in Bago Region.
- 8 March – Around 116 POWs held by the Arakan Army are killed in a Tatmadaw airstrike on a prison in Ann Township, Rakhine State.
- 13 March – The Tatmadaw retakes Tagaung, the last NUG-held town in Mandalay Region.
- 16 March – The Third Pyithu Hluttaw is convened at Naypyidaw. USDP party leader Khin Yi is elected as Speaker.
- 18 March - The Third Amyotha Hluttaw is convened at Nay Pyi Taw. Aung Lin Dwe is elected as Speaker.
- 30 March –
  - The Presidential Electoral College opens nominations for the 2026 Myanmar presidential election being held in April
  - General Ye Win Oo succeeds Senior-General Min Aung Hlaing as Commander-in-Chief of Defence Services.
  - The Committee Representing Pyidaungsu Hluttaw, National Unity Government, the Kachin Independence Organisation, the Karen National Union, the Karenni State Interim Executive Council, and the Chin National Front form a Steering Council for the Emergence of a Federal Democratic Union (SCEF).

=== April ===
- 3 April – 2026 Myanmar presidential election: Min Aung Hlaing is elected as 11th President of Myanmar. Nyo Saw as First Vice-President and Nan Ni Ni Aye as Second Vice President are elected respectively.
- 10 April –
  - Min Aung Hlaing is officially sworn in as president of Myanmar, along with his cabinet.
  - The KNU ratifies the interim Kawtholei Charter and establishes Kawtholei Consultative Council and Kawtholei Governing Council.
- 17 April – Min Aung Hlaing issues an amnesty for 4,335 prisoners and commutes all active death sentences to life imprisonment. The amnesty also sees the release of former president Win Myint and a reduction in the prison sentence for opposition leader Aung San Suu Kyi.
- 20 April – A bus collides with a van in Thaton Township, Mon State, killing 13 people.
- 30 April – Aung San Suu Kyi has her prison sentence shortened by one-sixth and commuted to house arrest for her remaining sentence.

=== May ===
- 1 May – A truck overturns in Ottarathiri Township, Naypyidaw Union Territory, killing 16 people and injuring 21 others.
- 11 May – A US diplomat is found fatally stabbed at a hotel in Yangon.
- 19 May – The Myanmar-Thai border town of Mawdaung, Tanintharyi Region is captured by the Tatmadaw from the KNU/KNLA.
- 28 May – The Thai–Myanmar Friendship Bridge No.2 is opened for the first time in more than 10 months.
- 31 May –
  - 2026 Namhkam Township explosion: More than 46 people are killed, including six children, and 74 others are injured in an explosion at a building storing explosives for mining in Namhkam Township, Shan State.
  - Min Aung Hlaing arrives in India for a five-day state visit.

=== June ===
- 3-6 June – 2026 AYA Bank Tri-Nations Cup
- 11 June – A former president of the American Chamber of Commerce in Myanmar is arrested in Yangon as part of an investigation into alleged suspicious financial transactions by former members of the board.

=== July ===
- 29 July – An agreement is reached for Myanmar to accept back around 5,000 Rohingya refugees residing in Malaysia.

=== August ===
- 3 August – A fighter aircraft of the Myanmar Air Force crashes in Hmawbi Township following a birdstrike. The pilot ejects safely.

=== September ===
- 28 September – Fifty people are killed in a Tatmadaw airstrike on Kyauktaw, Rakhine State.
- 29 September – Malaysia begins the repatriation of 5,000 Rohingya refugees to Myanmar.

=== October ===
- 8 October – The US begins direct negotiations with the military junta while continuing sanctions against its leader, Min Aung Hlaing, for human rights violations, notably the Rohingya genocide.

=== November ===
- 4 November – The Union Election Commission announces a by-election to be held in 4 April 2027.
- 19 November – The International Court of Justice rules in The Gambia v. Myanmar that Myanmar committed genocide against the Rohingya minority during its 2016–2017 military operations and acted with the intent to destroy a "substantial part" of the group.

== Holidays ==
- 1 January – New Year's Day
- 4 January – Independence Day
- 12 February – Union Day
- 2 March –
  - Peasants' Day
  - Full Moon Day of Tabaung
- 27 March – Armed Forces Day
- 13–16 April – Thingyan Water Festival
- 17 April – Myanmar New Year
- 30 April – Full Moon Day of Kason
- 1 May – Labour Day
- 19 July – Martyrs' Day
- 29 July – Full Moon Day of Waso
- 25–27 October – Full Moon Day of Thadingyut
- 23–24 November – Full moon day of Tazaungmon
- 4 December – National Day
- 25 December – Christmas Day

== Deaths ==
- 26 January – Myint Htwe, 78, minister of health and sport (2016–2021).
- 6 February – Sein Win, 81, prime minister of the NCGUB (1990–2012).
- 23 March – Tin Myint Aung, 58, football player (Finance and Revenue, national team) and manager (national team)
- 2 June – Min Htin Ko Ko Gyi, 64–65, film director, poet and political prisoner.
