= Union Day =

Union Day may refer to:

- Great Union Day, on December 1, also known as Unification Day, a national holiday of Romania
- Union Day (Myanmar), on February 12, commemorating the anniversary of the Panglong Agreement in 1947
- Union Day, on April 26 in Tanzania, commemorating the Unification of Zanzibar and Tanganyika in 1964

== See also ==
- Unification Day (disambiguation)
