= Tu Tu Tha =

Burmese journalist

- တူးတူးသာ
- Born: August 28, 1971
- Occupation: Journalist
- Parent(s): A Naung

Tu Tu Tha (Burmese: တူးတူးသာ; born 28 August 1971) is a Burmese journalist and novelist.

Tu Tu Tha was born on August 28, 1971, the daughter of prominent cartoonist A Naung. She initially trained as an engineer at the Government Technical Institute (Insein).

Tu Tu Tha was an editor for The Irrawaddy in Chiang Mai, Thailand and Yangon, Myanmar and later founded the short-lived Thanlyin Post. She worked as a teacher at the Myanmar Journalism Institute.

Her first novel, A Phay Kyaung, (Father's School, 2015), follows four Burmese immigrants to Thailand and their struggle to access education. She wrote the screenplay for the 2016 film adaptation, directed by Min Htin Ko Ko Gy and starring Chit Thu Wai and Ye Deight. She also published a collection of short stories, Phoot Din (2015), and another novel, Bandamar Lan Ka Alwan Chay Yar (2020).

In April 2021, she was arrested by the Myanmar military junta and detained in Insein Prison, charged with "incitement". She was released in October 2021 as part of a mass amnesty.

== Bibliography ==
- A Phay Kyaung, (Father's School, 2015)
- Phoot Din (2015)
- Bandamar Lan Ka Alwan Chay Yar (2020)
