= Sai Kham Leik =

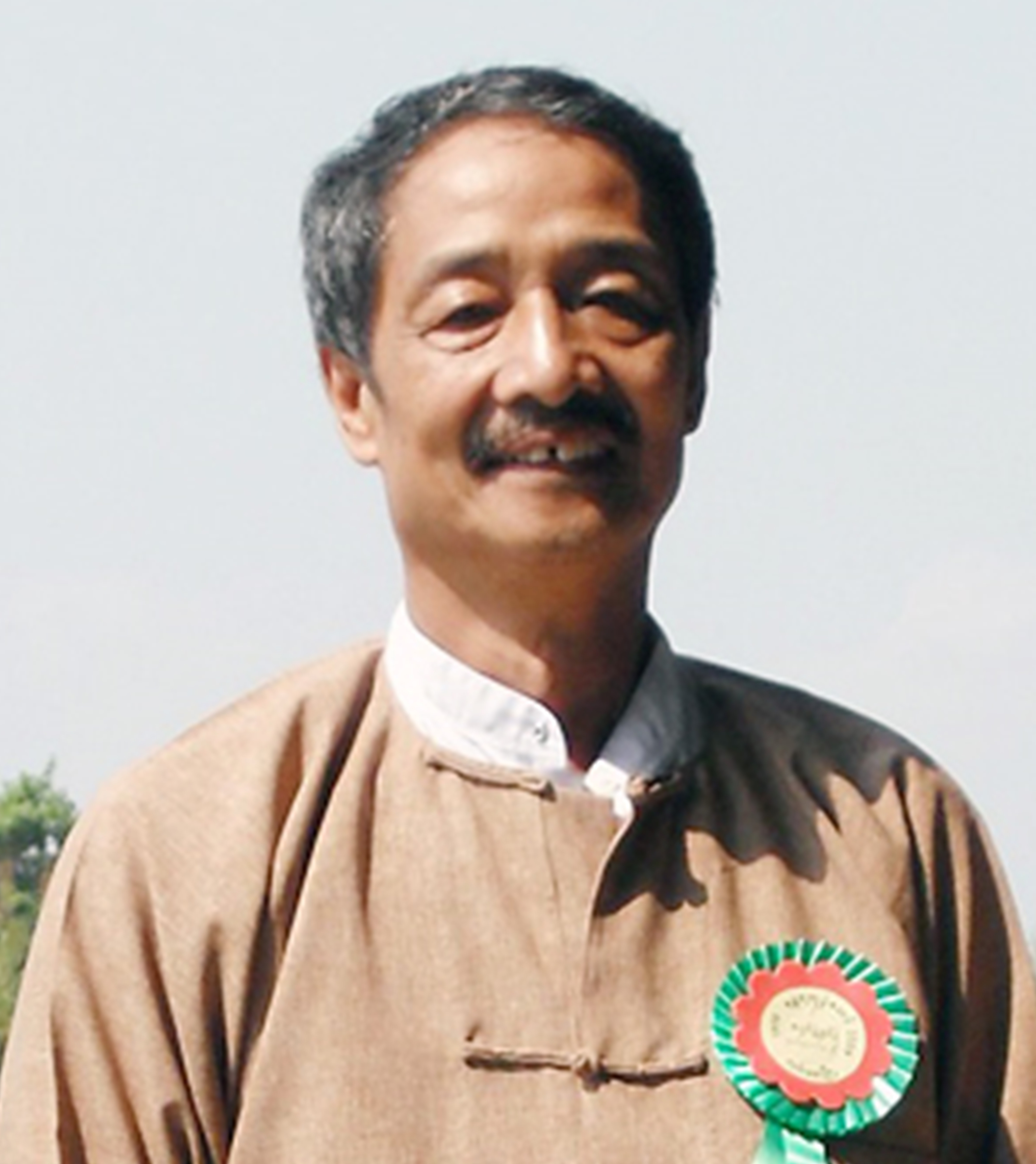

Background information
- Born: April 27, 1949 (age 76); Thenni Township, Shan State, Burma
- Genres: Folk rock
- Occupations: Physician; songwriter
- Years active: 1969–present

Sai Kham Leik (Shan: ၸၢႆးၶမ်းလဵၵ်း, Burmese: စိုင်းခမ်းလိတ်) is a Burmese songwriter. Said to be a physician by training he is an ethnic Shan songwriter and has written more than 500 songs in Burmese, 200 in Shan and about 35 in English.

His father, Kham Ka, was a noted poet and a former chief minister of Hsenwi Palace. He was born on 27 April 1949 in Hsenwi. He has three siblings. He married Dr. Nwe Nwe Tin in 1971 and has four children. He taught anatomy at the University of Medicine, Mandalay in 1990. He is also a persistence promoter of Shan culture. He is vital composer of late Sai Htee Saing, a well-known Shan singer of Myanmar. They met in 1969 and later they founded a successful music band, The Wild Ones. "Panglong Agreement" is his most celebrated song among Shan since 1971. It was sung by Sai Hsai Mao and recorded in Thailand in 1974 with the financial support of a renounced Wa leader.
