= Myint Naing (disambiguation) =

Myint Naing is a Burmese politician.

Myint Naing may also refer to:

- Htun Myint Naing, Burmese businessman
- Myint Naing (artist) (born 1967), Myanmar watercolour artist
- Myint Naing (professor) (born 1942), Burmese dental professor
- Myint Naing (MP) (born 1968), Burmese politician
