= Min Htin Ko Ko Gyi =

Burmese writer and filmmaker (c. 1961–2026)

- မင်းထင်ကိုကိုကြီး
- Born: c. 1961; Burma
- Died: 2 June 2026
- Occupations: Filmmaker; poet
- Children: 1

Min Htin Ko Ko Gyi (Burmese: မင်းထင်ကိုကိုကြီး; c. 1961 – 2 June 2026) was a Burmese documentary filmmaker, poet, film educator and political prisoner. He was known for his work in documentary film and human-rights cinema, and for founding the Human Dignity Film Institute and helping organise the Human Rights Human Dignity International Film Festival.

== Career ==
Min Htin Ko Ko Gyi directed eight feature-length films and two documentaries. His works included Human Zoo, Beyond the Dream, The Last Poem, and Floating Tomatoes. His 2010 film Floating Tomatoes won best documentary at the 2010 Documentary Film Association of Southeast Asian States.

In 2013, he founded the Human Dignity Film Institute, which trained young filmmakers in Myanmar. From 2013 to 2017, he organised the Human Rights Human Dignity International Film Festival, a film festival in Myanmar focused on human rights and social issues.

== Imprisonment ==
=== 2019 prosecution ===
In March 2019, Lieutenant Colonel Lin Tun of the Yangon Region Military Command filed a complaint against him under Article 66(d) of the Telecommunications Law over ten Facebook posts written in February and March 2019. The posts criticised the military's role in parliament and its opposition to constitutional amendment efforts. He was later charged under Section 505(a) of Myanmar's Penal Code. On 29 August 2019, the Insein Township Court sentenced him to one year of imprisonment with labour under Section 505(a). International and domestic rights groups criticised the prosecution as a restriction on freedom of expression.

He was released from Insein Prison on 21 February 2020 after completing his sentence. After his release, he called for reform of Myanmar's prison law and said that political prisoners were not given separate official status in prison.

=== 2021 re-arrest ===
On 1 February 2021, following the 2021 Myanmar coup d'état, Min Htin Ko Ko Gyi was re-arrested. He was among several veteran political prisoners and activists, including Maung Tha Cho, Than Myint Aung, and Mya Aye, who were detained in the immediate aftermath of the coup. Mizzima reported that he was later sentenced to two years under Section 505(b) and was released in November 2022.

== Personal life and death ==
Min Htin Ko Ko Gyi had one daughter, Me Min Htin. He died from liver cancer on 2 June 2026.
