= National Defence College (Myanmar) =

Military academy in Naypyidaw, Myanmar

Coordinates: 19°54′20.6″N 96°15′34.2″E

- နိုင်ငံတော်ကာကွယ်ရေးတက္ကသိုလ်
- Other name: NDC
- Established: 1958
- Parent institution: Ministry of Defence
- Commandant: Zaw Min Latt
- Location: Naypyidaw, Naypyidaw Union Territory, Myanmar

National Defence College (Burmese: နိုင်ငံတော်ကာကွယ်ရေးတက္ကသိုလ်, abbreviated NDC) is a military academy in Myanmar's national capital of Naypyidaw. Opened in 1958, NDC was one of several training facilities opened in the mid-to-late 1950s, the most well known among them being the Pyin Oo Lwin-based Defence Services Academy. Military officers can earn post-graduate master's degrees in defence studies from NDC.

Since 1994, NDC has offered one-year courses for officers above the rank of colonel. In 2016, nearly all military MPs appointed to the Amyotha Hluttaw and the Pyithu Hluttaw had completed their master's degrees at NDC.

In April 2023, Zaw Min Latt, the commandant of DSA, became NDC's commandant, replacing Kyaw Shwe Tun.
