= Cho Tun Aung =

Burmese army general and diplomat

His Excellency Wunna Kyaw Htin Brigadier General Cho Tun Aung
- ချိုထွန်းအောင်

Ambassador of Myanmar to Cambodia
- In office August 2022 – 22 May 2025
- President: Min Aung Hlaing

Personal details
- Born: c. 1968 Myanmar (Burma)
- Died: 22 May 2025 Mayangone Township, Yangon, Myanmar
- Citizenship: Myanmar
- Education: Defence Services Academy
- Profession: Military officer, diplomat
- Awards: Wunna Kyaw Htin (2022)

Military service
- Allegiance: Myanmar
- Branch/service: Myanmar Army
- Years of service: c. 1988–2025
- Rank: Brigadier General
- Unit: Office of the Judge Advocate General
- Commands: Office of the Judge Advocate General

Cho Tun Aung (Burmese: ချိုထွန်းအောင်; pronounced [t͡ɕò tʰʊ́ɰ̃ ʔàʊɰ̃]; c. 1968 – 22 May 2025) was a Burmese brigadier general and diplomat who served as Myanmar's Ambassador to Cambodia from August 2022 until his assassination on 22 May 2025. He previously held senior roles in the Myanmar Army's legal division and was a lecturer at the National Defence College at the time of his death.

== Early life and education ==
Cho Tun Aung was born in Myanmar around 1968. He graduated from the Defence Services Academy (DSA), Myanmar's leading military institution. He specialized in military law, which laid the foundation for his career in the army's legal corps and diplomatic service.

== Military career ==
Cho Tun Aung served in the Myanmar Army for nearly four decades (c. 1988–2025), holding key legal positions and later assuming diplomatic duties. He was primarily stationed in the Office of the Judge Advocate General, where he was responsible for military legal affairs, internal security matters, and the development and implementation of legal policies within the armed forces.

His role gained increased significance following the 2021 military coup, a period marked by expanded military legal and administrative operations. In recognition of his expertise, in February 2024, Cho Tun Aung was appointed a senior state-level adviser on enforcing the Reserve Military Forces Law, a regulation designed to strengthen Myanmar's military manpower reserves.

== Diplomatic service ==
In August 2022, Cho Tun Aung was appointed Myanmar's Ambassador to Cambodia under the military-led State Administration Council. His diplomatic role included overseeing bilateral relations and engaging in regional forums. His appointment followed the junta's pattern of assigning military officers to ambassadorial posts. His tenure continued until his death in May 2025.

== Assassination ==
On 22 May 2025, Cho Tun Aung was assassinated in Mayangone Township, Yangon, while walking outside his residence with his grandchild. He was shot by an urban guerrilla group calling itself the Golden Valley Warriors, which later claimed responsibility. The group stated that his involvement in teaching counterterrorism and internal security at the National Defence College made him a legitimate target.

After the shooting, military personnel transported Cho Tun Aung to a hospital, where he died from his injuries. His assassination marked one of the highest-profile targeted killings of a military-affiliated diplomat since the 2021 coup.

=== Aftermath and arrests ===
Between 23 and 29 May 2025, the military arrested at least 16 individuals across four regions in connection with the assassination. Those detained included the alleged gunman, Myo Ko Ko; his family members; and the owner of a private hospital suspected of treating the suspect's gunshot wound. Among those arrested was a six-year-old girl, whose involvement in the case has not been confirmed.

== Personal life ==
Very little is publicly known about Cho Tun Aung's personal life. He maintained a private lifestyle, and no official information has been released about his family beyond details of the attack.

== Awards ==
In 2022, Cho Tun Aung received the honorary title of Wunna Kyawhtin from the Myanmar government in recognition of his “exceptional contributions” to the state.

== See also ==
- Myanmar Army
- National Defence College (Myanmar)
- State Administration Council
- Min Aung Hlaing
- Foreign relations of Myanmar
