= Sai Htee Saing =

Sai Htee Saing စိုင်းထီးဆိုင်
- Born: Sai Tin U 23 September 1950; Langkho, Shan State, Burma (Myanmar)
- Died: 10 March 2008 (aged 57) Yangon, Myanmar
- Genres: Pop rock
- Occupations: Singer; songwriter
- Instruments: guitar; vocals
- Years active: 1969–2008
- Formerly of: The Wild Ones

Sai Htee Saing (Burmese: စိုင်းထီးဆိုင် [sáɪɰ̃ tʰí sʰàɪɰ̃]; 23 September 1950 – 10 March 2008; born Sai Tin U) was a distinguished Burmese singer and songwriter of Shan descent, which featured prominently throughout his music career. Throughout his career, he recorded two to three Shan language albums and 30 to 40 Burmese language albums. He was especially known for composing country music. Vital composer of Sai Htee Saing's songs is Sai Kham Leik.

Sai Htee Saing was born in Langkho, Shan State to Nang Ein and U Nanda. He studied at Mandalay University, where he became one of the founding members of The Wild Ones, an ethnic Shan band, in 1973. Sai Htee Saing began his music career in 1969, when he aired a Shan language song on the Burma Broadcasting Service. The Wild Ones achieved major success in Burma throughout the 1970s and 1980s, known for composing their own songs in the Burmese language. Sai Htee Saing was also prominent in the Shan literature movement to preserve Shan language education in Burma. He died on 10 March 2008 in his home No.33 Dhamavihaya Road, Kyar Kwat Thit, Kyauk Myaung, Yangon, and is buried at Yayway Cemetery in Yangon.

== Selected discography ==
The career of Sai Htee Saing spanned four decades and along with his group The Wild Ones he recorded more than 40 music albums; most of which were released originally on cassette. The following is a partial list.

== With The Wild Ones ==
- ပျောက်ဆုံးနေသောနိဗ္ဗာန်ဘုံ (1975)
- နန်းးခမ်းနွဲ့အတွက် သီချင်းတပုဒ် (1976)
- ကျေနပ်ပါတော့ (1977)
- စိတ္တဇအလွမ်း (1977)
- အိပ်စက်အနားယူပြီ (1978) with K Zin Latt
- နွေနံနက်ခင်း (July 1980)
- သဘာဝရဲ့ ရင်သွေးငယ် (February 1981) with Sat Maw
- " ငယ်ချစ်ဦး "
- " အရိုင်းမာယာရှင် "
- " မျက်ဝန်းပြာ "
- " ကျနော် ချစ်သော မှုံရွှေရည် "
- " တစ်မူးရှိလို့ တစ်ပဲလှူ "
- ဥပေက္ခာ လောကသား (March 1981) with Saw Thein Win
- လူကြမ်းမင်းသား (November 1981)
- ရန်ကုန်မှာ သာတဲ့လ (July 1982) with L Hkawn Yi
- ပလက်ဖောင်းမင်းသား (February 1983)
- " အမှတ်တရ "
- အမှတ်တရ ၂ (September 1983)
- အမှတ်တရ ၃ (February 1984)
- ကိုယ့်အချစ်နဲ့ အရာရာကို အကောင်းဆုံးဖြစ်စေမယ် (September 1984)
- ရေဒီယို ကမာရွတ် (February 1985)
- ချစ်အာမခံ (October 1985)
- မောင့်အရိုင်းပန်း (November 1985)
- သခင့်ဆီ အပြေးပြန်လာမည် (February 1986)
- လေညာအရပ်က အချစ် (January 1987)
- ဘဝမီးအိမ် (October 1987)
- ဝေးလုခါ၊ ဝေးနေချိန် (May 1988) with William
- ရတနာ (January 1989)
- အားလုံးကို ပျော်စေချင်ခဲ့သူ (August 1989) re-recordings of older hits
- " ကိုယ်တစ်ယောက်တည်းကျန်"
- " ချယ်ရီကိုသာ ပန်ပါကွယ်"
- " အချစ်ဖိတ်စာ "
- " ရခွင့် "
- " သင်္ဘောသားတစ်ယောက်အကြောင်း "
- " မတောင်းဘဲ ပြည့်တဲ့ဆု "
- " အကျည်းတန်ချစ်သူ "
- " မိုးလုံးပတ်လည် "
- " သပြေညိုဆိုတဲ့ပန်း "
- " အနီးဆုံးသွေး အဝေးဆုံးလူ "
- " အတ္တစိတ်ကူး "
- " အကောင်းတကာ့ အကောင်းဆုံးတေး "
- " အကောင်းတကာ့ အကောင်းဆုံးတေး ၂
- " အကောင်းတကာ့ အကောင်းဆုံးတေး ၃
- " အကောင်းတကာ့ အကောင်းဆုံးတေး ၄
- " အကောင်းတကာ့ အကောင်းဆုံးတေး ၅
- ဢမ်ႇမီးသင်လိူဝ်ႁၵ်ႉ (198?) Shan language re-recordings
- အချစ်ဆုတောင်း (February 1990) with Mi Mi Win Pe
- ခြင်္သေ့လည်ပြန် (April 1991) re-recordings on 16-track tape
- ဝမ်းရေး (October 1992) with Mi Mi Win Pe
- " မြဲနေသေးတဲ့ လက်တွဲတစ်ခု " With " Mi Mi Win Pe"
- " မှာသူတစ်ယောက် လာသူတစ်ယောက် " With Mi Mi Win Pe
- ' အမြတ်နိုးဆုံးနှင်း " With May Sweet
- " အချစ်မျဉ်းပြိုင် " With May Sweet
- " လက်ရေတပြင်တည်း " With Hay Mar Ni Win
- " မေတ္တာဂုဏ် " With Hay Mar Ni Win
- " ဆုံးဖြတ်လိုက်ပါ ဆုံးဖြတ်လိုက်ပြီး " With ဆလိုင်းဆွန်ကျဲအို
- " ရှင်သန်နေတဲ့မေတ္တာ " With ဆလိုင်းဆွန်ကျဲအို
- " အစစ်အမှန် " With နန်းနောင်နောင်
