= Panglong Agreement =

1947 agreement in Burma

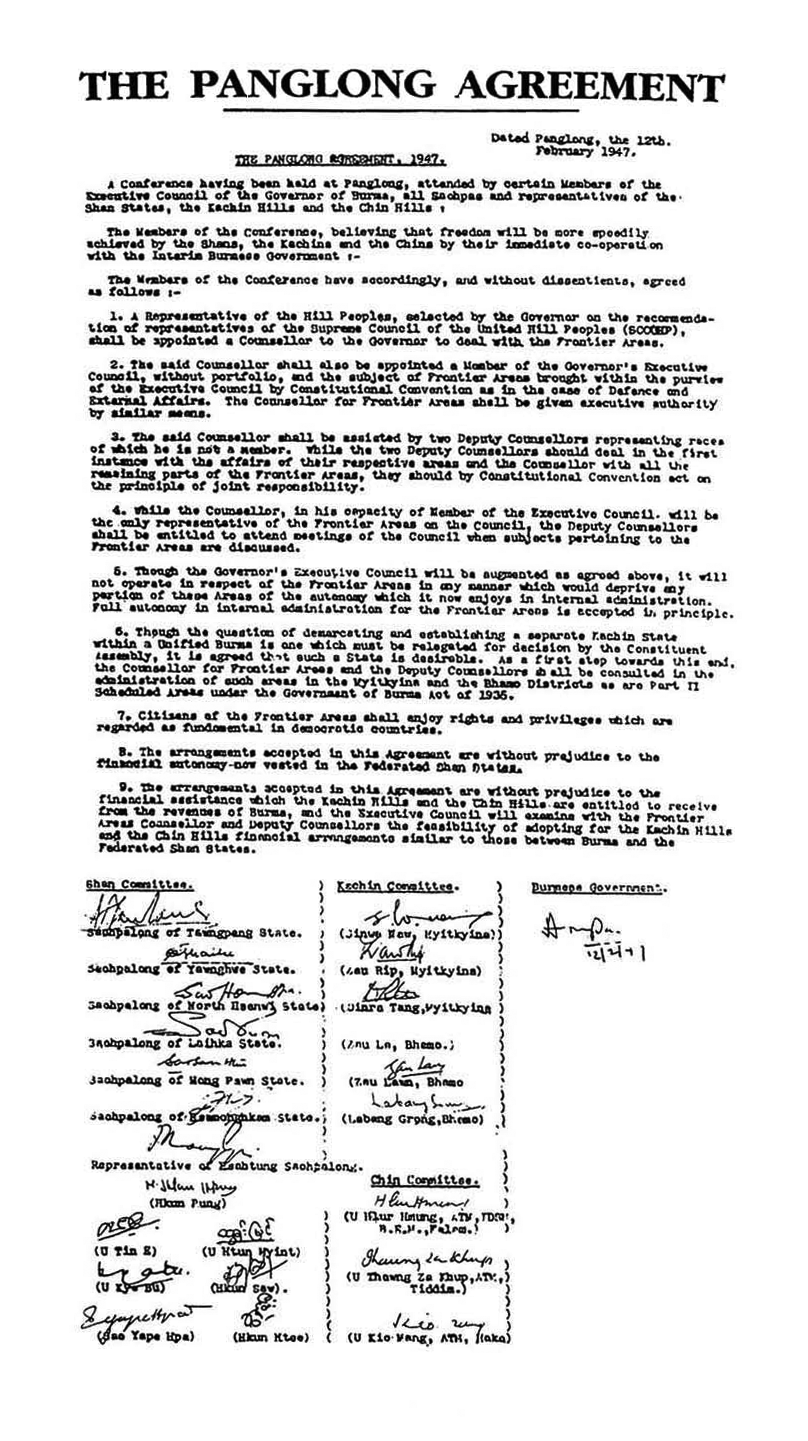
- Ratified: 12 February 1947
- Location: Panglong, Shan States
- Signatories: Aung San, ethnic Kachin Committee, Chin Committee and Shan Committee

Full text
- Panglong Agreement at Wikisource

The Panglong Agreement (Burmese: ပင်လုံစာချုပ် [pɪ̀ɰ̃ lòʊɰ̃ sà dʑoʊʔ]) was reached in Panglong, Southern Shan State, between the Burmese government under Aung San and the Shan Committee, Kachin Committee, and Chin Committee peoples on 12 February 1947. The anniversary of this agreement, which promised autonomy to ethnic minorities, is celebrated annually as Union Day.

== In popular culture ==
In 1973, Sai Kham Leik composed the Shan language song, "Lik Hom Mai Panglong" (Shan: လိၵ်ႈႁူမ်ႈမၢႆပၢင်လူင်, lit. 'Panglong Agreement'), for Sai Hsai Mao, which remains a pop classic.

== See also ==
- Federalism in Myanmar
- Panglong Conference
- Chin State
- Kachin State
