= Unification Day =

Unification Day may refer to:

- Unification Day (Bulgaria)
- Unification Day (Liberia)
- German Unity Day
- Unification Day (Italy)
- Union Day (Myanmar)
- Great Union Day (Romania)
- Unification Day (Ukraine)
