= Than Myint Aung =

Burmese philanthropist and writer

- သန်းမြင့်အောင်
- Born: c. 25.9.1953 (age 1972); Burma (now Myanmar)
- Occupations: Writer; philanthropist

Than Myint Aung (Burmese: သန်းမြင့်အောင်; born c. 1954) is a Burmese philanthropist and writer, known for her novels and short stories on societal issues.

In 2001, she co-founded the Free Funeral Service Society, a nonprofit that offers free funeral services for poor families. In 2005, she established the Thuka Yeikmyon orphanage for children with HIV in Yangon. In 2010, she established Twilight Villa, a retirement home for impoverished elderly people in Yangon's East Dagon Township. In 2013, she opened a second orphanage for children with HIV in Mandalay. In June 2014, she was awarded the Citizen of Burma award for her philanthropic work.

In June 2016, she was appointed to the Yangon City Development Committee.

In the aftermath of the 2021 Myanmar coup d'état, she was arrested by the military regime. She was released on 4 January 2023, which happened to be the Independence Day of Myanmar.
