= Myint Naing (artist) =

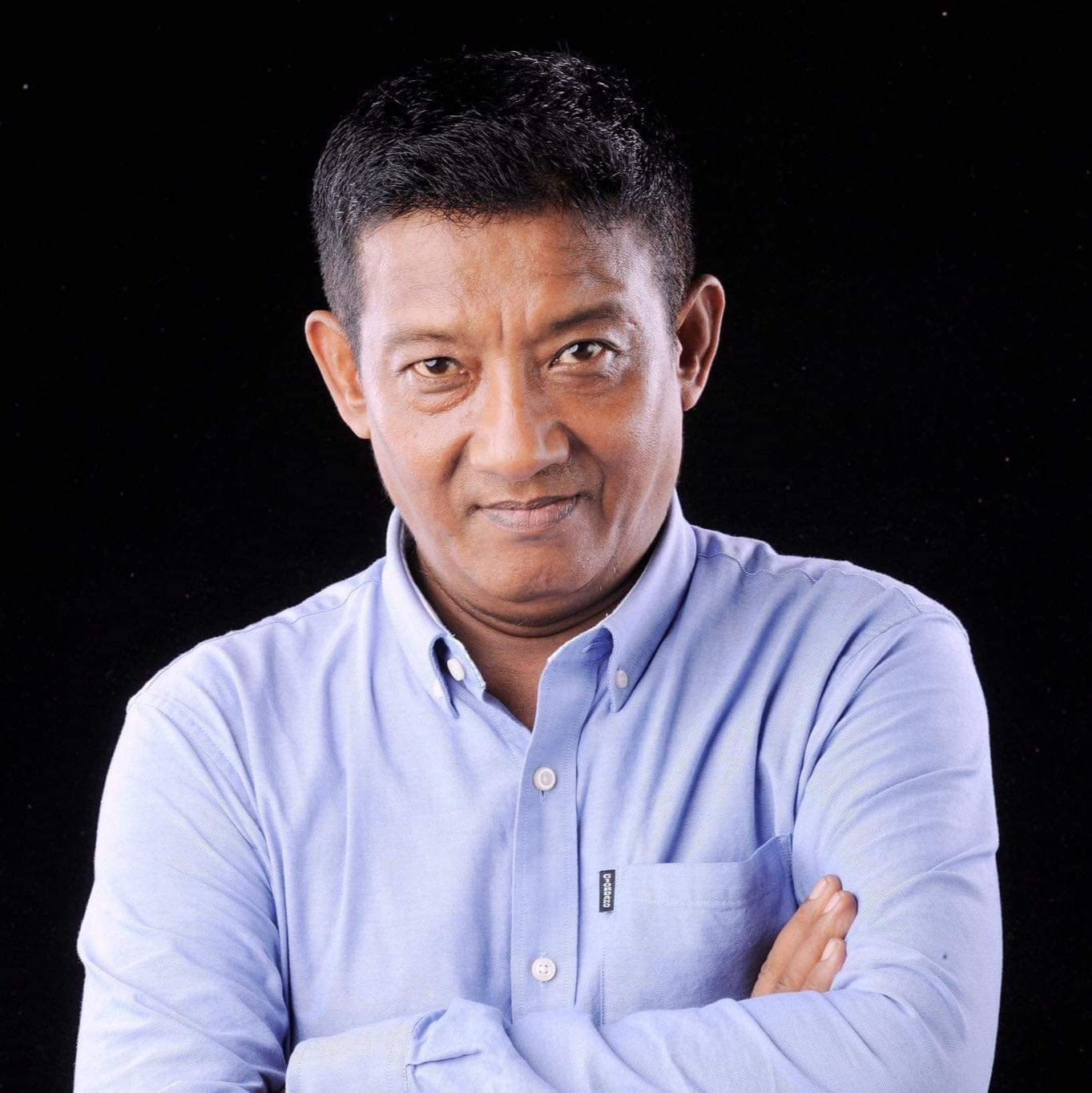
Myint Naing

Myint Naing (born 26 February 1967) is a Myanmar watercolour artist. Myint Naing was born in Kyaung Kone Village, Thandwe Township, Rakhine State, Myanmar. He graduated in painting from the State School of Fine Arts (Yangon)(1986–1989). He has participated in numerous international art exhibitions and has received awards from several competitions. His artworks are collected by the National Museum of Myanmar (Yangon) as well as by many local and international collectors. He is a full-time artist.

Achievements

2017	TOP 10 Landscape Artist Award and IWS India Award (2nd Tirana International Watercolor Biennale, Tirana, Albania.)
2017	First Place Award (Thoughts Made of Water, International Watercolor Exhibition, IWS Mexico.)
2017	Excellence Award (The 1st David International Watercolor Competition and International Watercolor Celebrity Invitational Exhibition, Jinan, Shandong, China.)
2017	1st Winner (Landscape) Award (Harmony Through Watercolor, 2nd International Watercolor Socieity India Biennale, AIFACS, New Delhi, India.)
2021	Excellent Award – Top 10 (“FALL 2021” Vietnam International Invitational Watercolour Exhibition, Vietnam.)
2021	Best Watercolor Medium Award (“Truly Watercolor” International Juried Online Watercolor Exhibition, Nepal.)
2023	Gold Award (3rd International Watercolor Festival-2023, Kathmandu, Nepal.)

Museum Collections

2017	Collected by Shandong Qilu Museum of Art (Jinan, Shandong, China) (2017)
2017	Collected by World Art League, Xi'an, China (2017)
2018	Collected by National Museum of Myanmar (Yangon) (2018)

Exhibitions

1995	Orient Art Gallery Group Show, Yangon.
1998	Myanmar Art 98, Lokanat Galleries, Yangon.
1999	Platinum Art show, Lokanat Galleries, Yangon.
2000	Outdoor Watercolour Group Exhibition, Lokanat Galleries, Yangon.
2000	Artist Touch Art Exhibition, Lokanat Galleries, Yangon.
2001	Year 2001 Art Exhibition, Art & Artisans Association Show Room, Yangon.
2002	North Dagon Artist Group Show, Art & Artisans Association Show Room, Yangon.
2006	The Myanmar Gallery of Contemporary Art (MGCA) Member, Yangon.
2007	Colourful Petals Art Exhibition, Art & Artisans Association Show Room, Yangon.
2008	The Givers Art Exhibition
2008	Contemporary Art of Myanmar, Singapore.
2009	The Mandalay Arm Art Show (Mandalay 150th Anniversary)
2010	Orient Art Gallery Group Show, Yangon.
2011	The Friends Art Exhibition, School of Fine Arts, Yangon.
2011	Horizons Art Gallery Group Show, Yangon.
2013	Paper in the Rain, Myanmar Ink Art Gallery, Yangon.
2013	The 3rd Asia Watercolour Artists Network Exhibition, Singapore.
2014	The 3rd Global Network of Watercolor Painters, Shanghai Hongqiao Contemporary Art Museum, Shanghai, China.
2014	Watercolour 2014 Art Show, Gallery 65, Yangon.
2015	Watercolour 2015 Art Show, Gallery 65, Yangon.
2016	Watercolour 2016 Art Show, Gallery 65, Yangon.
2016	Myanmar and Khon Kaen University Artist Relationship Art Exhibition, Khon Kaen University, Thailand.
2016	Watercolour Exhibition for the 234th Year of RATTANAKOSIN, 333 Gallery, Bangkok, Thailand.
2016	Asian Watercolor Art Workshop & Exhibition 2016 (June 17-21, 2016), Krabi, Thailand.
2016	Asian Watercolour Expression III - 2016, Bandung, West Java, Indonesia.
2016	Myanmar Art Italy 2016 Art Exhibition, Milan, Italy.
2016	1st International Watercolour Biennale, Thailand 2016, Thailand.
2016	Myanmar – Thailand Watercolour Art Exchange And Workshop, 2016, Yangon.
2016	The 3rd Silk Road International Festival, International Art Exhibition 2016, (Sept. 7 – 21, 2016), Shaanxi Province Art Museum, Xi'an, China.
2016	International watercolour festival cum plein air workshop, Nepal.
2017	2nd Tirana International Watercolor Biennale 2017 (Mar. 12 – Apr. 12, 2017), National Historical Museum, Tirana, Albania. (TOP 10(ten) Landscape Artist Award and IWS India Award)
2017	Watercolour 2017 Art Show, Gallery 65, Yangon.
2017	The 4th Silk Road International Arts Festival, (Sept. 7 – 21, 2017), Shaanxi Province Art Museum, Xi'an, China.
2017	Thoughts Made of Water, International Watercolor Exhibition 2017, (Oct. 6 – Nov. 5, 2017), IWS Mexico. (First Place Award)
2017	The 1st David International Watercolor Competition and International Watercolor Celebrity Invitational Exhibition (Oct. 22 – Nov. 5, 2017), Shandong Qilu Museum of Art (Jinan, Shandong, China). (Excellence Award)
2017	Watercolor And Love, 2nd International Watercolor Biennale - 2017, (Oct. 23 – 30, 2017), IWS Vietnam, Hanoi Museum, Vietnam. (Demonstration)
2017	Harmony Through Watercolor 2017, 2nd International Watercolor Society India Biennale, (Dec. 8 – 14, 2017), AIFACS, New Delhi. (1st Winner (Landscape) Award)
2018	Watercolor 2018 Art Exhibition, Gallery 65, Yangon.
2018	Penang Watercolour Society 35th Anniversary exhibition (Apr. 4 – 19, 2018), Penang State Art Gallery.
2018	Watercolor Painting Exhibition, Hochiminh City Fine Arts Association (May 15 - 25, 2018), Vietnam.
2018	Colour of Friendship, Thailand & Myanmar Art Exhibition, (Jun. 7 - 14, 2018), National Museum, Yangon.
2018	TURKEY AND MYANMAR "Meet Love & Peace & Tolerance" Mixed Art Exhibition, (Jul. 18 – 25, 2018), IWS FIRÇA Art Gallery, Ankara, Turkey.
2018	"Our Wonderful World" Ukraine 2018, International watercolor exhibition, (Jul. 15 – 22, 2018), Kharkov, Ukraine.
2018	The 5th Silk Road International Arts Festival 2018, Shaanxi Province Art Museum, Xi'an, China.
2018	Demonstration @ K Village Art Gallery, (Oct. 6 – 7, 2018), K Village, Bangkok.
2019	Peaceful Golden Heritage 2019, 1st International Watercolor Festival Myanmar, The Strand Hotel Ballroom, Yangon. (Jan. 29 – Feb. 1, 2019)
2019	Watercolor 2018 Art Exhibition, Galljery 65, Yangon.
2019	The 3rd International Watercolour Biennale IWS Vietnam 2019, (Apr. 20 – 30, 2019), Hochiminh City Fine Arts Museum, Vietnam.
2019	The 6th Silk Road International Arts Festival 2019, Shaanxi Province Art Museum, Xi'an, China.
2019	Blue Lake-Heaven Qingdao International Watercolor Exhibition 2019, China.
2019	Hay Manda Art Exhibition, The Strand Hotel, Yangon. (Dec. 26 – 27, 2019)
2020	Southeast Asia Watercolour Exhibition, National Art Gallery, Langkawi, Malaysia. 0(Sept. 16 – Nov. 30, 2020)
2020	Exposition Internationale D’aquarelle, ALBI France & HCMC Vietnam.
2020	JIWI Autumn Masterpieces Internet Exhibition 2020, Japan.
2021	JIWI International Watercolor Internet Exhibition 2021, Japan.
2021	JIWI Internet Exhibition of Excellent Painting Autumn 2021, Japan.
2021	“FALL 2021” Vietnam International Invitational Watercolour Exhibition, (Oct. – Nov. 2021), Vietnam. (Excellent Award – Top 10)
2021	“Truly Watercolor”, 1st International Juried Online Watercolor Exhibition, (Dec. 10 – 30, 2021), Nepal. (Best Watercolor Medium Award)
2022	KORAT International Watercolor 2022, MCC Hall the Mall Korat, Thailand. (Aug. 10 – 31, 2022)
2022	JIWI Internet Exhibition of Excellent Painting Autumn 2022, Japan.
2022	“The Great Beauty of Harmony”, 2022 International Watercolor Invitational Exhibition, (The 5th South Asia Southeast Asia Education Cooperation Kunming Forum Series Activities), Maitreya East Charm Town International Art Center, Yunnan Arts University, Kunming, China. (Oct. 15 – 28, 2022)
2022	The 3rd International Cultural and Art Exchange Exhibition, Taiwan Hualien. (Oct. 29 – Nov. 12, 2022)
2023	Light Upon Shexiang – Jingning International Watercolor Exhibition, Jingning She Nationality Museum, China. (Jan. 1 – 25, 2023)
2023	The 4th International Cultural and Art Exchange Exhibition, Taiwan Hualien. (Jun., 2023)
2023	The 4th Luxu Watercolor Town International Watercolor Master’ Works Invitation Exhibition, Nanning, China. (May. 23 – Jun. 10, 2023)
2023	Arts in Heritage Seminar organized by SEAMEO SPAFA, Bangkok Art and Culture Centre (BACC), Thailand. (Aug. 8 – 9, 2023) (Demonstration)
2023	The 1st Qingdao International Watercolor Festival, Qingdao International Conference Center, Qingdao, China. (Aug. 22 – 26, 2023)
2023	Dalian International Watercolor Master Work Invitational Exhibition, Dalian Zhongshan Art Museum, Dalian, China. (Oct. 13 – 29, 2023)
2023	3rd International Watercolor Festival-2023, Kathmandu, Nepal. (Dec. 2 – 6, 2023) (Gold Award) (Demonstration)
2023	International Watercolor Exhibition Thailand Biennale 2023, Chiang Rai, Thailand. (Dec. 2023)
2024	“Stretch Your Imagination” International Online Art Exhibition. (May 12 – Jun. 16, 2024)
2024	“Colourful Splashes” SWS 55th Annual Exhibition 2024, Singapore Chinese Cultural Centre, Singapore. (Sept. 7 – 12, 2024)
2024	The 10th Silk Road International Arts Festival 2024, Shaanxi Province Art Museum, Xi'an, China.
2025	25th JIWI Online Spring Exhibition 2025, Japan.
2025	The 3rd (Bright Compassionate Love for Harmony & Peace) Online Art Exhibition. (May 11 – 27, 2025)
2025	“2025 Reflections of Nature – The Harbor Road Painting Exhibition” (Online Art Exhibition) (May 2025)
2025	Hatyai International Watercolor Art Exchange, Art Exhibition & Plein Air, Hatyai, Songkhla, Thailand. (Jun. 12 – 15, 2025)
2025	2nd Qingdao International Watercolor Festival, Qingdao Painting Academic Gallery, Qingdao, China. (Aug. 22 – 26, 2025)
2025	“Peaceful August Festival Exhibition – A Radiant Month of Global Celebration” (Online Art Exhibition) (August 2025)
2025	The 8th Xishuangbanna International Art Exhibition, Xishuangbanna, Yunnan, China. (Sept. 26 – Oct. 26, 2025)
2025	CAT AIR Malaysia International Watercolour Exhibition 2025, Capital Fine Art Gallery, Malaysia. (Nov. 1 – 16, 2025)
2025	The 1st Watercolor Monthly Exhibition, (Nov. 2025), Sketching China.
2026	Illuminated Grace for a Brighter New Year Online Art Exhibition. (Jan. 1, 2026)
2026	1st Myanmar Watercolour Community Exhibition 2026, The Gallery by AYA SOMPO, Yangon. (Mar. 7 – 9, 2026)
2026	Compassionate Light for Peace • With Love, Ending Conflict Online Art Exhibition (May 10 – Jun. 10)
