= The Wild Ones (Burmese band) =

Burmese rock band formed in 1973 in Mandalay

The Wild Ones ဒဝိုင်းလ်ဒ်ဝန်စ်
- Origin: Mandalay, Myanmar
- Genres: Rock, Burmese rock, pop rock, folk rock
- Instruments: Guitar, vocal, drums
- Years active: 1973–1980s
- Past members: Sai Htee Saing, Sai Kham Leik

The Wild Ones (Burmese: ဒဝိုင်းလ်ဒ်ဝန်စ်), also known as (Burmese: သဘာဝရဲ့ရင်သွေးငယ်) is a Burmese rock band that formed in 1973 in Mandalay, Myanmar. The group is widely recognized for its pioneering role in introducing Western rock influences into Burmese popular music and for blending these styles with traditional Burmese musical elements. The band enjoyed significant popularity during the 1970s and 1980s and is considered influential in shaping the country’s rock music scene.

== History ==
The Wild Ones was established in 1973 in Mandalay under the leadership of singer-songwriter Sai Htee Saing. At a time when Myanmar’s music industry was dominated by traditional styles, the band introduced a new sound by incorporating elements of Western rock and country music. Their innovative approach quickly resonated with younger audiences and played a role in the evolution of modern Burmese popular music. Over the years, the band released several albums that contributed to its reputation as a trailblazer in the local rock scene.

== Musical career ==
During its peak, The Wild Ones built a reputation for energetic live performances and a distinctive musical style that combined electric guitars and dynamic percussion with Burmese melodies. Their recordings from the 1970s and 1980s helped popularize rock music among Burmese youth and influenced subsequent generations of local musicians. Songs such as "Nya-mway-pann" became staples in live performances and are still remembered as iconic tracks in Burmese rock history.

== Discography ==
The band’s discography, while not comprehensively documented in available sources, includes several albums and singles that were well received during their active years. Notable releases include:

=== Albums ===
1. ပျောက်ဆုံးနေသောနိဗ္ဗာန်ဘုံ (1975)
2. နမ်းခမ်းနွဲ့အတွက် သီချင်းတပုဒ် (1976)
3. ကျေနပ်ပါတော့ (1977)
4. စိတ္တဇအလွမ်း (1977)
5. နွေနံနက်ခင်း (1980)
6. သဘာဝရဲ့ရင်သွေးငယ် (1981)
7. ဥပေက္ခာ လောကသား (1981)
8. လူကြမ်းမင်းသား (1981)
9. ရန်ကုန်မှာ သာတဲ့လ (1982)
10. ပလက်ဖောင်မင်းသား (1983)
11. အမှတ်တရ (1983)
12. အမှတ်တရ ၂ (1983)
13. အမှတ်တရ ၃ (1984)
14. ကိုယ့်အချစ်နဲ့အရာရာကိုအကောင်းဆုံးဖြစ်စေမယ် (1984)
15. ရေဒီယိုကမာရွတ် (1985)
16. ချစ်အာမခံ (1985)
17. မောင့်အရှိုင်းပန် (1985)
18. သခင့်ဆီအပြေးပြန်လာမည် (1986)
19. လေညာအရပ်က အချစ် (1987)
20. ဘဝမီးအိမ် (1987)
21. ဝေးလုခါ၊ ဝေးနေချိန် (1988)
22. ရတနာ (1989)
23. အားလုံးကိုပျော်စေချင်ခဲ့သူ (1989)
24. အချစ်ဆုတောင်း (1990)
25. ခြင်္သေ့လည်ပြန် (1991)
26. ဝမ်းရေး (1992)

=== Singles ===
Among their singles, Nya-mway-pann became particularly popular and is frequently covered by other Burmese rock bands.

== Legacy ==
The Wild Ones are regarded as one of the pioneering rock bands in Myanmar. Their efforts to fuse Western rock with traditional Burmese music laid the groundwork for later artists and continue to be celebrated by fans of Burmese popular music. The innovative style of The Wild Ones, along with the influential role of Sai Htee Saing, remains a significant chapter in the history of Myanmar’s music scene.
