= Shwe Nya War Sayadaw =

Burmese Buddhist monk (1965–2025)

- ရွှေညဝါဆရာတော်
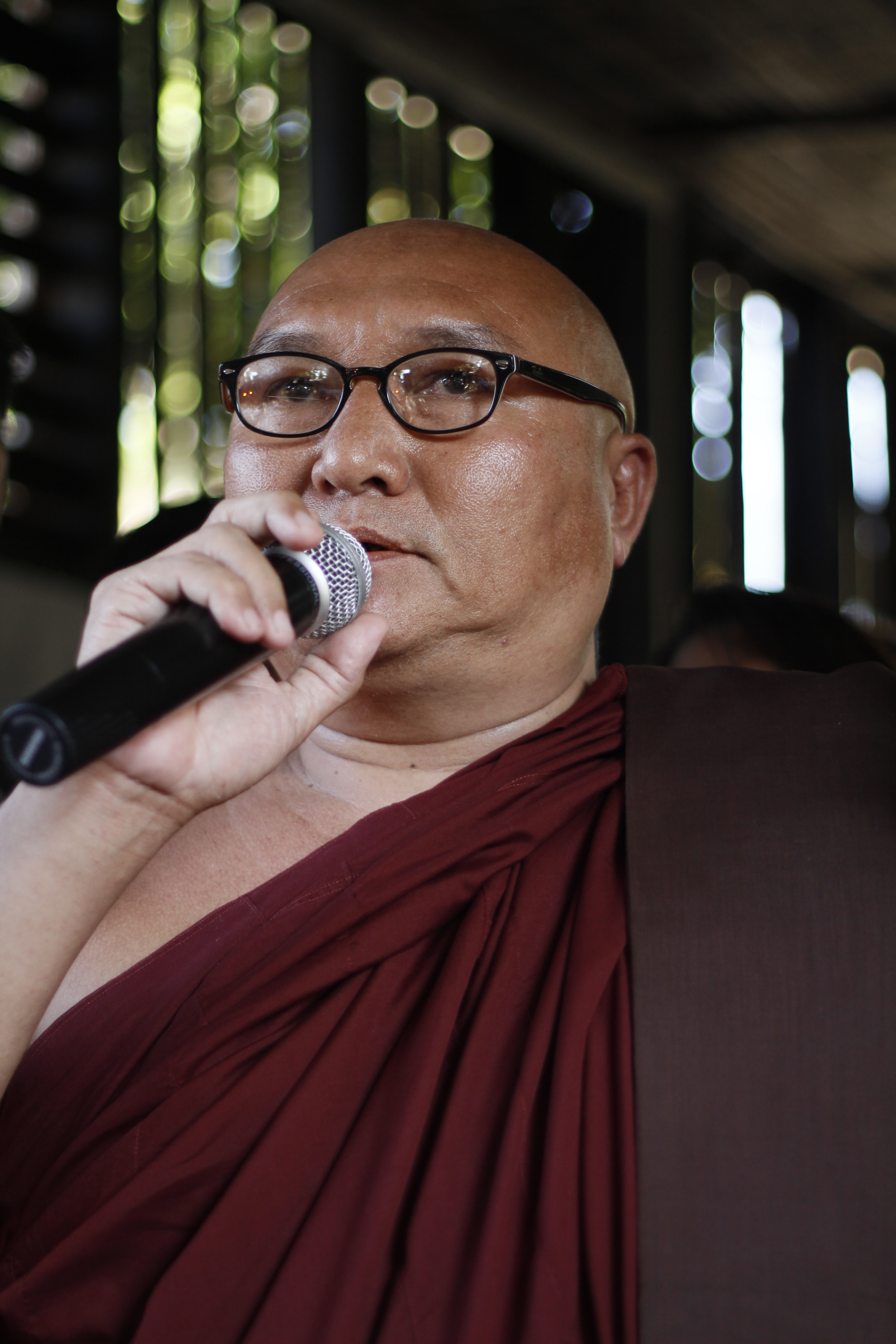
- Shwe Nya War in 2011
- Title: Sayadaw

Personal life
- Born: Maung; 14 May 1965 Payagon, Yamethin District, Mandalay Division, Burma
- Died: 10 July 2025 (aged 60) Yangon, Myanmar
- Occupation: Buddhist monk

Religious life
- Religion: Buddhism
- School: Theravada
- Dharma name: Paññāsiha ပညာသီဟ
- Ordination: 27 wa

Senior posting
- Based in: Yangon, Yangon Region, Myanmar

U Pinnyasiha (ပညာသီဟ), commonly known as the Shwe Nya Wa Sayadaw (Burmese: ရွှေညဝါဆရာတော် ဦးပညာသီဟ, pronounced [ʃwèɲa̰wà sʰəjàdɔ̀]; 14 May 1965 – 10 July 2025), was a Burmese Theravada Buddhist monk, best known for teaching at Yangon Buddhist University in Kyimyindaing Township in Yangon. In December 2011, he met Hillary Clinton, US Secretary of State, along with other civil society delegates.

== Early life ==
Shwe Nya War Sayadaw was born on 14 May 1965 in Phayagon village, Mandalay Division, to U Htun Yin and Daw Hla Tot.

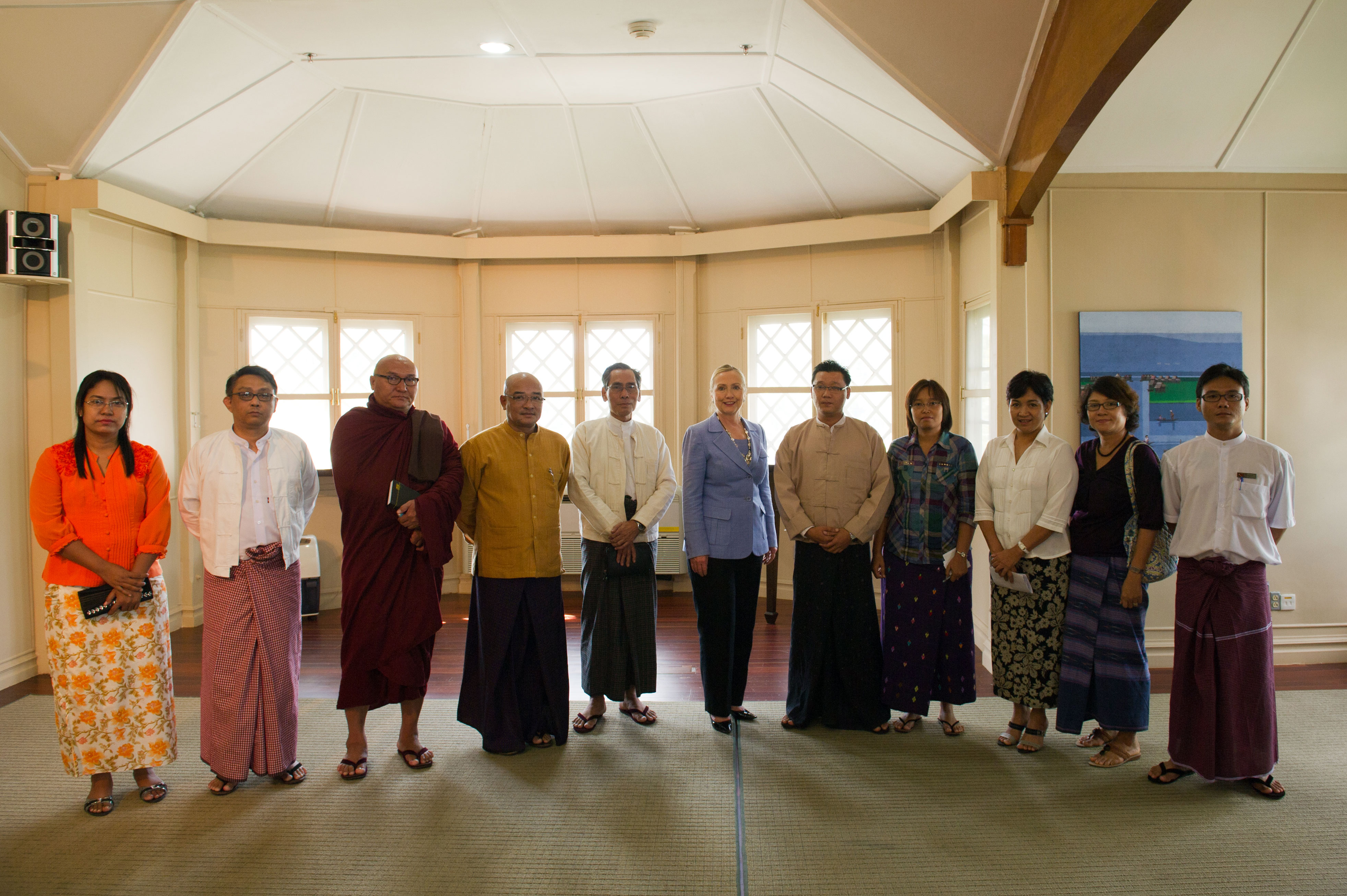
In December 2011, US Secretary of State Hillary Clinton met with Shwe Nya War Sayadaw, along with other civil society representatives. (Clicking on a person's face will take you to an article about the person.)

== Monkhood career ==
In February 2012, Shwenyawa Sayadaw, the abbot of the Sadhu Pariyatti Monastery, was evicted from his monastery by the State Sangha Maha Nayaka Committee for alleged disobedience, by holding a sermon at the Mandalay office of the National League for Democracy in September, where he had publicly called for the release of political prisoners and the end of ongoing civil wars.

Shwenyawa Sayadaw was known to be a controversial and outspoken figure. He criticised many of his peers in the Buddhist clergy for corruption and failure to live up to their religious obligations, as well as speaking out against the government and the military. Most notably he was known for his strong opposition to the nationalistic and anti-Muslim 969 movement. Shwenyawa Saydaw urged calm and restraint during the 2013 Burma anti-Muslim riots.

In the wake of the 2021 Myanmar coup d'état on 1 February, he was detained by the Myanmar Armed Forces.

== Death ==
On 10 July 2025, Shwe Nya War Sayadaw died from liver disease at Asia Royal Hospital in Yangon. He was 60.

On 10 July 2025, died of cancer at Pinlon Hospital in Yangon, at the age of 67, He died within hours of another former political prisoner, Maung Thar Cho, who was also hospitalized in Yangoon at the he time of his death.
