= Mar Mar Aye =

Mar Mar Aye မာမာအေး
- Born: Aye Myint; July 26, 1942; Myaungmya, Japanese-occupied Burma
- Died: January 8, 2024 (aged 81) Fort Wayne, Indiana, U.S.
- Genres: Burmese classical
- Occupation: Singer
- Instrument: Voice
- Years active: 1955–2024

Mar Mar Aye (Burmese: မာမာအေး; July 26, 1942 – January 8, 2024) was a Burmese singer and actress. She was considered one of the most successful female singers in the history of Burmese classical music.

== Early life and career ==
Mar Mar Aye was born Aye Myint in Myaungmya, a town in the Irrawaddy delta to musician parents. Her father, U Aye, was a hne (flute) musician while her mother Than Hnit was a singer with the stage name Myaungmya Than. She began singing at an early age. In 1955, she gained national recognition as a singer with the song "Playing on the Rainbow". By the 1980s, 80% of film soundtracks were sung by Mar Mar Aye.

In 1961, she worked as an assistant broadcaster at Burma Broadcasting Service (now Myanmar Radio). She was an executive member of the country's Modern Music Council and a committee member of Gita Padaytha magazine. In 1971, she established Taythanshin Records. Additionally, in 1976, the Aye Singing Training School was established. During that period, she wrote poetry and songs using the pen name "Lay Mar". She published the novel Lamb's Mommy.

Mar Mar Aye emigrated from Burma in 1998 under General Than Shwe's military regime and resettled in Fort Wayne, Indiana in the United States. She has been politically active. During the Saffron Revolution, she released a song entitled "Heartache Till the End of the World" (အသည်းနာကမ္ဘာမကျေ). In 2012, she returned from exile to Myanmar, at the authorization of President Thein Sein.

On 25 July 2012, she released a Burmese language memoir, Dear Friend, Look Deeply Into My Heart (ရင်ဖွင့်ကြည့်ပါသူငယ်ချင်း), which recounts the aftermath of her divorce in 1970.

Mar Mar Aye died at her home in Fort Wayne on January 8, 2024, at the age of 81.

== Discography ==
=== Solo albums ===
- စိန်စီတဲ့တေးတပုဒ်
- ပျိုတိုင်းကြိုက်တဲ့နှင်းဆီခိုင်
- ရွှေဘုံနိဒါန်း
- ချစ်ပါရမီ (Love and Virtue)
- ချစ်တာပဓာန
- ပခန်းစံ
- ကြည်ကြည်ဌေး၏မာမာအေး (Kyi Kyi Htay's Mar Mar Aye)
- မုန့်စား (Eating a Snack)
- သုတိမင်္ဂလာ (Sounds of Auspiciousness)
- မင်းကွန်းမထေရ်လွမ်းမပြေ
- နှစ်ကျိပ်ရှစ်ဆူ
- အရုဏ်ဦးလင်းရောင်ခြည်တေးများ
- ကြည်နူးဖွယ်နံနက်ခင်းတေးများ
- ကျွဲမ (Lady Water Buffalo)
- ကံ့ကော်တစ်ထောင် (A Thousand Ceylon Ironwood Flowers)
- မကျည်းတန်ရင်ဖွင့်လိုက်ပြီ
- အောင်ခြင်းရှစ်ပါး (The Eight Victories)
- ဖက်ခွက်စားရှင်းတမ်း
- စာဆိုတော်နှင့်အဆိုပြိုင်ဝင်တေးများ
- အကျည်းတန်ချစ်သူ
- မဆုံဆည်းခဲ့လေသောအချစ်
- မြပန်းခွေ (Emerald Flower Cassette)
- မေ့ကွက်ကိုရှာ
- တရေးချစ်ခွင့်မြင်ရနိုး
- ဇမ္ဗူရစ်ရွှေ (Eugenia Gold)
- နန်းမြို့တော်မှနိဒါန်းသဝဏ်လွှာ
- မည်းပြာပုဆိုး (Dark Blue Paso)
- ရွှေနှင်းဆီ (Golden Rose)
- မြခြူသံ
- ဓမ္မစကြာ (Dharmacakra)
- မပန်းဝေနှင့်ရွှေပြုံးငွေပြုံး
- ယောက်မ (Sister-in-Law)
- ဗုဒ္ဓသာသနာရောင် (Colors of the Buddhist Sasana)

=== Collaboration albums ===
- မေတ္တာပေါင်းကူး (Metta Bridge) - with May Sweet
- ရေဒီယိုမှတ်တမ်း (Records of the Radio) - with Tin Tin Mya and Cho Pyone

== Filmography ==
- Mya Chu Than
- Ko Chit Thu Hma De
- Mandali
