= Sai Hsai Mao =

Shan musician

Sai Hsai Mao Sai Saing Maw ၸၢႆးသၢႆမၢဝ်း
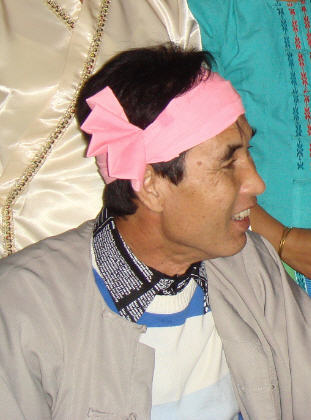

Background information
- Born: 18 February 1948; Muse, Shan State, Burma (Myanmar)
- Died: 17 July 2024 (aged 76); Yangon
- Genres: Pop rock
- Occupations: Singer; songwriter
- Instruments: guitar; vocals

Sai Hsai Mao (Shan: ၸၢႆးသၢႆမၢဝ်း; 1948 – 17 July 2024), also known as Sai Saing Maw (Burmese: စိုင်းဆိုင်မောဝ်), was a distinguished Burmese singer and musician of Shan descent. Born in Muse, Burma, he was the most prominent singer of Shan pop music, known for his prolific cover songs. He was based in Thailand, which is home to a large Shan community. Throughout his career, he has also released 10 Burmese language albums.

Sai Hsai Mao gained popularity after 1968, when a Shan language program on Radio Thailand broadcast his music. From 1973 to 1976, he was associated with the Shan State Army - East. His most famous song, "Lik Hom Mai Panglong" (Panglong Agreement), was composed by Sai Kham Leik in 1973. He died on 17 July 2024 at the age of 76 in Insein Township, Yangon Region.

== Discography ==
- Kau Yon Pe Tang
- Tender Cherry Leaf Songs (ချယ်ရီရွက်နုတေးများ)
- Father's Son (အဖေ့ရဲ့သား)
