= Zaw Min Latt =

Burmese politician

Member of the Amyotha Hluttaw
- Incumbent
- Assumed office 1 February 2016
- Constituency: Shan State No.1
- Majority: 226919 votes

Personal details
- Born: 12 April 1974 (age 52) Shwebo, Sagaing Region, Burma (Myanmar)
- Party: National League for Democracy
- Spouse: War War Lwin
- Parent(s): Than Tun (father); Khin Cho (mother)
- Education: Mandalay Technological University B.E (Mechanical), MIT

Zaw Min Latt (Burmese: ဇော်မင်းလတ်, born 12 April 1974), also known as Ko Latt, is a Burmese politician currently serving as a House of Nationalities MP representing the Shan State No. 1 constituency. He is a member of National League for Democracy.

== Early life and career ==
He was born on 12 April 1974 in Shwebo, Sagaing Region, Burma (Myanmar). He graduated with B.E (Mechanical), MIT from Mandalay Technological University. His previous job was as a trader.

== Political career ==
He is a member of the National League for Democracy. In the 2015 Myanmar general election, he was elected to the Amyotha Hluttaw, winning a majority of 226919 votes from the Shan State No. 1 parliamentary constituency.
