= Maung Thar Cho =

Burmese writer (1958–2025)

- မောင်သာချို
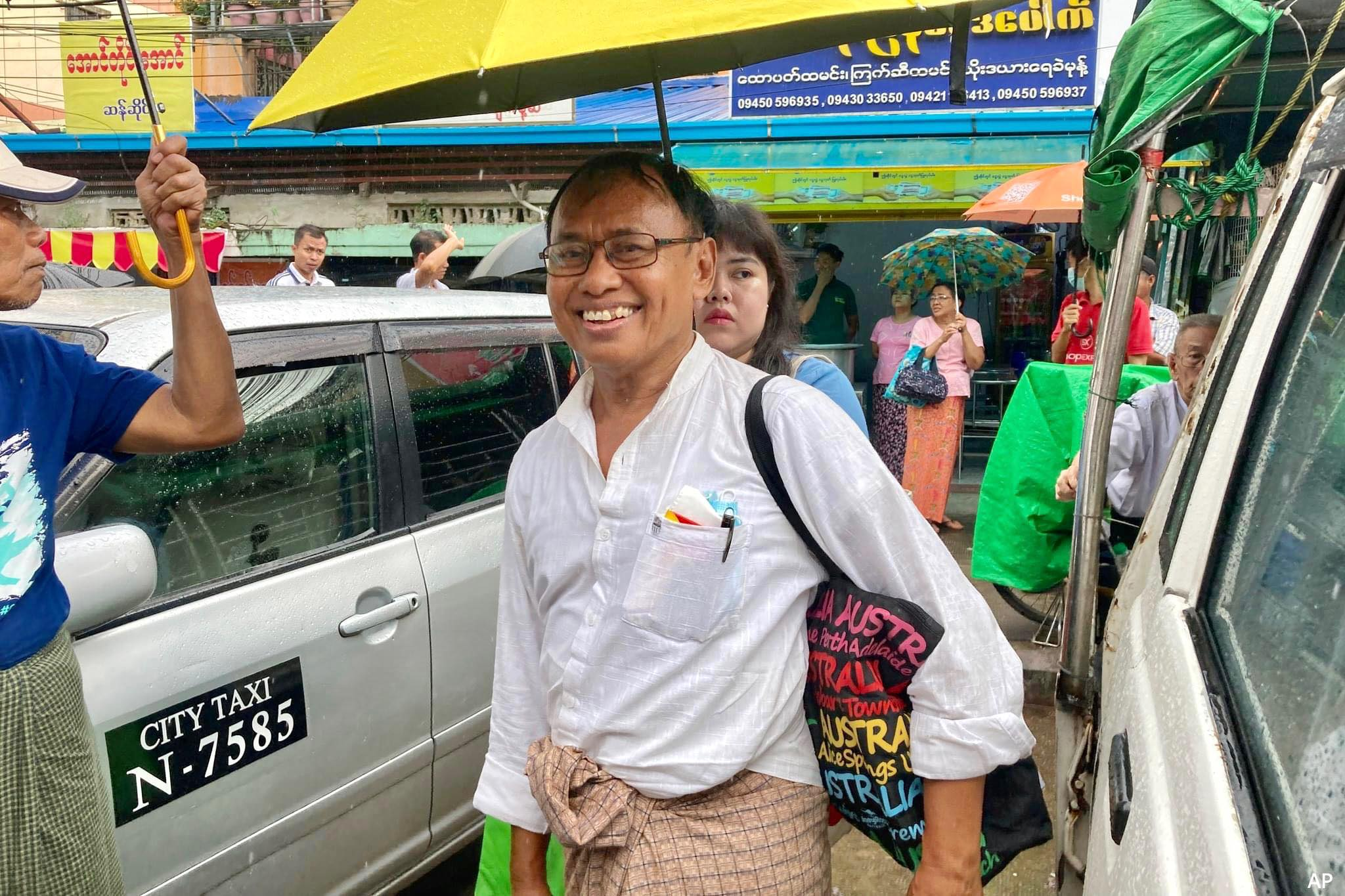
- Maung Thar Cho in 2022
- Born: 11 March 1958; Thonegwa, Kungyangon Township, Burma
- Died: 10 July 2025 (aged 67); Yangon, Myanmar
- Occupations: writer; academic
- Spouse: Khin Thet Swe
- Writing career
- Pen name: Jack (Kungyangon)
- Notable work: For Daughter to Read
- Notable awards: Tun Foundation Literary Award (2009)

Maung Thar Cho (Burmese: မောင်သာချို; 11 March 1958 – 10 July 2025) was a Burmese writer, academic and politician. He served as a professor of Myanmar literature at the Yangon Teacher Training College. He wrote satirical articles for the 7Day Daily newspaper under the pseudonym of Jack - Kungyangon. These pieces proved immensely popular and earned him a following among NLD supporters, who invited him to literary talks around the country.

Maung Thar Cho was also known for criticizing the Tatmadaw via his literary talks and taking up politically sensitive cases against the Burmese military junta and generals.

== Early life and education ==
Maung Thar Cho was born on 11 March 1958 in Thonegwa village, Kungyangon Township, Yangon Division, Myanmar. He was the eldest child among three siblings.

He graduated from Yangon University in 1981 with a BA Myanmar. In 1983, he graduated with an honorary BA Myanmar. He received his master's degree in 1988.

== Career ==
Thar Cho began his literary career in 1973, when he was in 10th grade. A poem, "Khit Thit Metta" which for the first time appeared in the December issue of Thaung Pyaung Htwela magazine is the piece with which he is said to have become an author. In 1988, he became a senior editor of Eainmet Phoo magazine.

Later, he worked as a teacher at the Workers College, Regional College, Foreign Language Science, Yangon University, Meikhtila Degree College and Hinthada College. He moved to Yangon Teacher Training College and served as a lecturer in the Myanmar Department.

In 1997, he won the Mandalay Readers' Favourite Literary Award for his article Stars Ahead of Us (ဖျတ်ခနဲတွေ့ရသည့် ကျွန်တော်တို့ရှေ့က ကြယ်တာရာများ). In 1999, he won the Phyu Friends Literary Award for his article For Daughter to Read (သမီးလေးဖတ်ဖို့). In 2000, he won the Taungoo New Archive Literary Award for his book Articles for My Daughter to Read. In 2004, he won the Htan Yeik Nyo Literary Award for his book Linkara Road. In 2009, he was awarded the Tun Foundation Literary Award for his book Articles for My Daughter to Read.

Maung Thar Cho was arrested in the early hours of the 2021 Myanmar coup d'état on 1 February, along with state leaders, ministers, and several political figures. He was not in good health after undergoing military interrogation. He was sentenced to two years in prison on incitement charges under Section 505(a) of the Myanmar Penal Code. He was released on 16 November 2022 as part of a promised mass release of political prisoners.

== Death ==
On 10 July 2025, Maung Thar Cho died of cancer at Pinlon Hospital in Yangon, at the age of 67, within hours of another hospitalized former political prisoner, anti-regime Buddhist monk Shwe Nya War Sayadaw.

== Selected works ==
Thar Cho authored over 72 books, of which 47 books written under Maung Thar Cho, authored under Jack (Kungyangon). Some of his selected works are as follows:

Under the pen name of Maung Thar Cho

- သမီးဖတ်ဖို့
- ပင်လယ်ဝသို့ လှေကလေးနဲ့ ထွက်ခဲ့
- အိပ်မက်များ အနားမလာရ
- လင်္ကာရလမ်း
- နှလုံးသားရှုမျှော်ခင်းများ
- ပိုးပင်လယ်ပေါ် ကတ္တီပါရွက်လွှင့်
- ဖျတ်ခနဲတွေ့ရသော ကျွန်တော်တို့ရှေ့က ကြယ်တာရာများ
- စိမ်းလန်းသောမိသားစုများ
- ကျေးဂျူးကမ္ဘာဆိုင်
- ဥတ္တရလမင်းနှင့် မြောက်ဘက်တောင်ကုန်းပေါ်က မှော်ရုံလမ်းများ
- ခရီးသည် ရောက်ရာက မမေ့ပါဘု

Under the pseudonym of Jack (Kungyangon)

- သပွတ်အူကျေးရွာမှ မမြင်ရသော ကံတရားများ
- တို့တော့မယ်တဲ့ ဆိတ်တော့မယ်
- ဂျာနယ်ထဲက ဂျက်
- ရယ်လို့သာ မောကြပေတော့
- လွမ်းလို့ရယ်တဲ့ မကုန်နိုင်တယ်
- တုတ်ထိုးအိုးပေါက်
- ဆင်တော်မှာ ခလောက်ကို ဆွဲပါလို့
- မပြောကောင်း မဆိုကောင်း
- လူကြားလို့ မကောင်းဘူး
- ဂျက် ၅၀ စာအုပ်
