= Peasants' Day =

Public holiday in Myanmar

Peasants' Day တောင်သူလယ်သမားနေ့
- Observed by: Myanmar
- Type: National
- Significance: Commemorates the 1962 Burmese coup d'état
- Date: 2 March
- Frequency: Annual

Peasants' Day (Burmese: တောင်သူလယ်သမားနေ့) is a public holiday in Myanmar, marking the 1962 Burmese coup d'état. In 1965, the Union Revolutionary Council designated the day as a gazetted holiday, and commemorates the contributions of farmers. Before the change, Peasants' Day was observed on 1 January.

== See also ==
- Public holidays in Myanmar
