= National Day (Myanmar) =

Public holiday in Myanmar

National Day အမျိုးသားနေ့
- Observed by: Myanmar
- Type: National
- Significance: Commemorates the anniversary of the first university student strike at Rangoon University in 1920.
- Date: 10th day after the full moon of Tazaungmon
- Frequency: Annual

National Day (Burmese: အမျိုးသားနေ့) is a public holiday in Myanmar, marking the anniversary of the first university student strike at Rangoon University in 1920. The date is based on the traditional Burmese calendar, occurring on the 10th day following the full moon of Tazaungmon. In Myanmar, National Day differs from Independence Day, which is marked on 4 January.

== See also ==
- University of Yangon
- British rule in Burma
