= Union Day (Myanmar) =

Public holiday in Myanmar

Union Day ပြည်ထောင်စုနေ့
- Observed by: Myanmar
- Type: National
- Significance: commemorates the Panglong Agreement in 1947
- Date: 12 February
- Frequency: Annual

Union Day (Burmese: ပြည်ထောင်စုနေ့) is a public holiday in Myanmar, marking the anniversary of the historic Panglong Agreement in 1947. This day was crucial for Myanmar's independent because it united the upper and lower parts of Myanmar.

== See also ==
- Panglong Agreement
- Panglong Conference
