= Saw Sala of Sagaing =

Saw Sala စောစလာ

Queen of the Northern Palace of Pinya
- Tenure: June – September 1364
- Predecessor: Shin Saw Gyi
- Successor: Disestablished
- Born: c. 1340s Sagaing, Sagaing Kingdom
- Died: Unknown; Ava (Inwa), Ava Kingdom
- Spouse: Uzana II
- Issue: unknown
- House: Sagaing
- Father: Kyaswa
- Mother: Saw Pa Oh
- Religion: Theravada Buddhism

Saw Sala (Burmese: စောစလာ, pronounced [sɔ́ səlà]) was a principal queen consort of King Uzana II of Pinya.

== Ancestry ==
The queen was descended from the Pagan and Myinsaing royal lines.

Ancestry of Queen Saw Sala

8. Thihathu
4. Saw Yun
9. Yadanabon of Pinya
2. Kyaswa of Sagaing
10. Kyawswa of Pagan
5. Saw Hnaung of Sagaing
11. Saw Soe of Pagan
1. Saw Sala
12. Kyawswa of Pagan
6. Uzana I of Pinya
13. Mi Saw U
3. Saw Pa Oh of Sagaing
14. unnamed
7. unnamed
15. unnamed

== Bibliography ==
- Than Tun (December 1959). "History of Burma: A.D. 1300–1400". Journal of Burma Research Society. XLII (II).

Saw Sala of Sagaing Pinya Kingdom Born: c. 1340s
Royal titles
Preceded by Shin Saw Gyi	Queen consort of Sagaing; June 1364 – September 1364	Pinya Kingdom disestablished
