= Nawrahta Minye =

Anawrahta II of Sagaing Nawrahta Minye နော်ရထာ မင်းရဲ

King of Sagaing
- Reign: c. April – November 1349
- Predecessor: Kyaswa
- Successor: Tarabya II
- Chief Minister: Nanda Pakyan
- Born: 5 November 1326; Wednesday, 11th waxing of Nadaw 688 ME; Sagaing, Sagaing Kingdom
- Died: c. November 1349 (aged 23) c. Nadaw 711 ME; Sagaing, Sagaing Kingdom
- House: Myinsaing
- Father: Saw Yun
- Mother: Saw Hnaung
- Religion: Theravada Buddhism

Nawrahta Minye (Burmese: နော်ရထာ မင်းရဲ, pronounced [nɔ̀jətʰà mɪ́ɰ̃ jɛ́]; also Anawrahta II of Sagaing) was king of Sagaing for seven months in 1349. He reversed his predecessor Kyaswa's policy of peace with Sagaing's cross-river rival Pinya although no war broke out. He was succeeded by his younger brother Tarabya II.

== Brief ==
Minye was the third child of Queen Saw Hnaung and King Saw Yun of Sagaing. He was a grandson of kings Thihathu of Pinya and Kyawswa of Pagan. His father died about three months after his birth. Because the elder brother Kyaswa was not yet four, their half-uncle Tarabya I succeeded the throne, and raised Saw Hnaung as his chief queen. Minye grew up at the Sagaing Palace until he was about nine. In 1335/36, he and his three full siblings had to flee to Mindon, deep inside Pinya's territory after their half-cousin Shwetaungtet seized the throne. The siblings spent the next three years in exile with the help of their mother and her ally Chief Minister Nanda Pakyan until their cover was blown and brought back to Sagaing in 1339. But after a palace battle between loyalists of Shwetaungtet and Tarabya I killed both Shwetaungtet and Tarabya, Kyaswa was placed on the throne by Nanda Pakyan.

Kyaswa reigned for the next nine plus years. Minye likely played no more than a nominal role in his brother's administration since Nanda Pakyan actually ran the country. However, he was thrust into the center stage in 1349 when Kyaswa died without leaving a male heir. (Note: Chronicles have no records of Kyaswa's children. A contemporary inscription per (Than Tun 1959: 127) shows Kyaswa had at least one daughter. Even if Kyaswa did leave one or more male heirs, they would have been too young to become king in 1349.) Minye became king with the reign name of Anawrahta. He apparently found a white elephant, considered a propitious symbol, during his reign, and proclaimed himself Hsinbyushin ("Lord of the White Elephant").

His reign lasted just over seven months. He may have reversed Kyaswa's policy of peace with Sagaing's cross-river rival Pinya. He gave sanctuary to Gov. Nawrahta of Pinle who was fleeing from his elder brother King Kyawswa I of Pinya. But no war broke out. Minye died shortly after 8 November 1349. He left no male heirs, and was succeeded by his younger brother Tarabya II.

== Chronicle reporting differences ==
The royal chronicles do not agree on his birth, death and reign dates.

Source	Birth–Death	Day of birth	Age	Reign	Length of reign	Reference
Zatadawbon Yazawin	5 November 1326 – 1352	Tuesday	25 (26th year)	1344–1352	8 years	(Note: (Zata 1960: 71): Tuesday, 10th nekkhat of the 8th month of 688 ME = 11th waxing of Nadaw 688 ME = Wednesday, 5 November 1326. Zata says he was a Tuesday born but all other major chronicles say he was a Wednesday born (as his personal name "Ye" implies).)
Maha Yazawin	c. 1327–1352/53	Wednesday	25 (26th year)	1344/45–1352/53	8 years	
Yazawin Thit	c. 1320–1349/50	Wednesday	29 (30th year)	1349–1349/50	7 months	
Hmannan Yazawin	c. 1320–1349/50	Wednesday	29 (30th year)	1349–1349/50	7 months	
Inscriptions	– after 8 November 1349			after 16 April 1349 – after 8 November 1349	7 months	(Note: Contemporary inscriptions suggest a few weeks' gap between Kyaswa's death and Minye's accession. One inscription (Than Tun 1959: 127) says Kyaswa died in 710 ME (29 March 1348 to 28 March 1349). An inscription donated by Minye himself (Yazawin Thit Vol. 1 2012: 175, footnote 2) states that he came to power in 711 ME (29 March 1349 to 28 March 1350), and shows that he was still alive on Sunday, 13th waning of Tazaungmon 711 ME (8 November 1349). Since an inscription by Princess Soe Min (Yazawin Thit Vol. 1 2012: 175−176) shows that Kyaswa's successor Minye reigned for seven months in 711 ME, Minye came to power no earlier than 14th waning of Tagu 711 ME (17 April 1349). But if the inscription referenced in (Than Tun 1959: 127) is accurate, Kyaswa died no later than 28 March 1349, the last day of 710 ME.)

== Ancestry ==
Ancestry of King Anawrahta II of Sagaing

8. Theinkha Bo
4. Thihathu
9. Lady Myinsaing
2. Saw Yun
10. unnamed
5. Yadanabon of Pinya
11. unnamed
1. Nawrahta Minye
12. Narathihapate
6. Kyawswa of Pagan
13. Shin Hpa of Pagan
3. Saw Hnaung of Sagaing
14. Yazathingyan of Pagan
7. Saw Soe of Pagan
15. Saw Khin Htut of Pagan

== Bibliography ==
- Royal Historians of Burma (1960) [c. 1680]. U Hla Tin (Hla Thamein) (ed.). Zatadawbon Yazawin (in Burmese). Historical Research Directorate of the Union of Burma.
- Kala, U (2006) [1724]. Maha Yazawin (in Burmese). Vol. 1–3 (4th printing ed.). Yangon: Ya-Pyei Publishing.
- Maha Sithu (2012) [1798]. Kyaw Win; Thein Hlaing (eds.). Yazawin Thit (in Burmese). Vol. 1–3 (2nd ed.). Yangon: Ya-Pyei Publishing.
- Royal Historical Commission of Burma (2003) [1832]. Hmannan Yazawin (in Burmese). Vol. 1–3. Yangon: Ministry of Information, Myanmar.
- Than Tun (December 1959). "History of Burma: A.D. 1300–1400". Journal of Burma Research Society. XLII (II).

Nawrahta Minye Myinsaing Dynasty Born: 5 November 1326 Died: c. November 1349
Regnal titles
Preceded by Kyaswa	King of Sagaing c. April – November 1349	Succeeded by Tarabya II
