= Tarabya II of Sagaing =

Tarabya II ဆင်ဖြူရှင် တရဖျား

King of Sagaing
- Reign: c. November 1349 – 23 February 1352
- Predecessor: Anawrahta II
- Successor: Thihapate
- Chief Minister: Nanda Pakyan
- Born: 12 October 1327; Monday, 11th waning of Thadingyut 689 ME; Sagaing, Sagaing Kingdom
- Died: 23 February 1352 (aged 24); Thursday, 9th waxing of Tabaung 713 ME; Sagaing, Sagaing Kingdom
- House: Myinsaing
- Father: Saw Yun
- Mother: Saw Hnaung
- Religion: Theravada Buddhism

Tarabya II of Sagaing (Burmese: ဆင်ဖြူရှင် တရဖျား, pronounced [sʰɪ̀ɰ̃ pʰjú ʃɪ̀ɰ̃ təja̰pʰjá]; 1327–1352) was king of Sagaing from 1349 to 1352. He reestablished peace with Sagaing's rival Pinya.

== Brief ==
Tarabya the younger was the youngest child of Queen Saw Hnaung and King Saw Yun of Sagaing. He was born eight months after his father's death. His half-uncle Tarabya I succeeded the throne, and made his mother the chief queen. The younger Tarabya grew up at the Sagaing Palace until he was about eight. In 1335/36, he and his three full siblings had to flee to Mindon, deep inside Pinya's territory after their half-cousin Shwetaungtet overthrew Tarabya I. The siblings spent the next three years in exile with the help of their mother and her ally Chief Minister Nanda Pakyan until their cover was blown and brought back to Sagaing in 1339. But after a palace battle between loyalists of Shwetaungtet and Tarabya I killed both Shwetaungtet and Tarabya, the eldest brother Kyaswa was placed on the throne by Nanda Pakyan.

Tarabya like his middle brother Minye played no more than a nominal role in Kyaswa's reign (1339−49) since Nanda Pakyan actually ran the country. Nevertheless, he became king in late 1349 after Kyaswa and Minye died within eight months that year. He inherited Minye's white elephant, and proclaimed himself Hsinbyushin ("Lord of the White Elephant").

Tarabya II's reign lasted just over two years. He pursued a guarded policy towards Sagaing's traditional rival Pinya. In 1351, he gave sanctuary to Gov. Saw Ke of Yamethin, who fled from King Kyawswa II of Pinya. This followed Minye's giving sanctuary to Gov. Nawrahta of Pinle in 1349. But Tarabya tried to cool the situation by sending his sister Princess Soe Min and her husband Gov. Thado Hsinhtein of Tagaung to seek a truce with Kyawswa II. The embassy was successful, and the peace between the two Central Burmese kingdoms was maintained. He died soon after, and was succeeded by Soe Min's second husband Thihapate on 23 February 1352.

== Chronicle reporting differences ==
The royal chronicles do not agree on his birth and death dates.

Source	Birth–Death	Age	Reign	Length of reign	Reference
Zatadawbon Yazawin	20 October 1337 [sic] – 1355	17 (18th year)	1352–1355	3	(Note: (Zata 1960: 43, 71) says he was born on Monday, 25th nekkhat of the 9th month of 699 ME (11th waning of Thadingyut 699 ME = 20 October 1337), which is clearly a typographical error since (1) his father Saw Yun was already dead by the full moon of Tabaung 688 ME (5 February 1327) per inscriptional evidence (Than Tun 1959: 126); and (2) Zata (Zata 1960: 43) itself (incorrectly) says Saw Yun died in 692 ME (29 March 1330 to 28 March 1331). He was likely born ten years earlier than reported in Zata; 11th waning of Thadingyut 689 ME (Monday, 12 October 1327), about eight months after his father's death.)
Zatadawbon Yazawin (partially reconciled)	12 October 1327 – 1355	27 (28th year)	1352–1355	3	
Maha Yazawin	c. 1331–1354/55	23 (24th year)	1352/53–1354/55	2	
Yazawin Thit	c. 1320 – 23 February 1352	31 (32nd year)	1349/50 – 23 February 1352	3 [sic]	
Hmannan Yazawin	c. 1321 – 11 February 1353 [sic]	31 (32nd year)	1349/50 – 11 February 1353 [sic]	3 [sic]	(Note: (Hmannan Vol. 1 2003: 391–392) says Minbyauk Thihapate ascended the throne on Thursday, 9th waxing of Tabaung 714 ME (11 February 1353), which is a typographical error. The Yazawin Thit chronicle (Yazawin Thit Vol. 1 012: 175–176), which Hmannan referenced, says Thursday, 9th waxing of Tabaung 713 ME (23 February 1352). The 1353 date is inconsistent with Hmannan's own reporting a page later that Thihapate was dethroned in his 13th year of reign in April 1364 (Kason 726 ME). It means he came to power in 1352, not 1353. The actual date per (Than Tun 1959: 127) was as reported in Yazawin Thit, 23 February 1352.)

== Ancestry ==
Ancestry of King Tarabya II of Sagaing

8. Theinkha Bo
4. Thihathu
9. Lady Myinsaing
2. Saw Yun
10. unnamed
5. Yadanabon of Pinya
11. unnamed
1. Tarabya II
12. Narathihapate
6. Kyawswa of Pagan
13. Shin Hpa of Pagan
3. Saw Hnaung of Sagaing
14. Yazathingyan of Pagan
7. Saw Soe of Pagan
15. Saw Khin Htut of Pagan

== Bibliography ==
- Royal Historians of Burma (1960) [c. 1680]. U Hla Tin (Hla Thamein) (ed.). Zatadawbon Yazawin (in Burmese). Historical Research Directorate of the Union of Burma.
- Kala, U (2006) [1724]. Maha Yazawin (in Burmese). Vol. 1–3 (4th printing ed.). Yangon: Ya-Pyei Publishing.
- Maha Sithu (2012) [1798]. Kyaw Win; Thein Hlaing (eds.). Yazawin Thit (in Burmese). Vol. 1–3 (2nd ed.). Yangon: Ya-Pyei Publishing.
- Royal Historical Commission of Burma (2003) [1832]. Hmannan Yazawin (in Burmese). Vol. 1–3. Yangon: Ministry of Information, Myanmar.
- Than Tun (December 1959). "History of Burma: A.D. 1300–1400". Journal of Burma Research Society. XLII (II).

Tarabya II of Sagaing Myinsaing Dynasty Born: 12 October 1327 Died: 23 February 1352
Regnal titles
Preceded by Anawrahta II	King of Sagaing c. November 1349 – 23 February 1352	Succeeded by Thihapate
