= Tarabya (disambiguation) =

Tarabya is a neighbourhood in Sarıyer district of Istanbul, Turkey.

Tarabya may also refer to:

- Tarabya of Pegu, rebel ruler of Pegu, c. 1287 – c. 1296
- Tarabya I of Sagaing, king of Sagaing, 1327–1335/36
- Tarabya II of Sagaing, king of Sagaing, 1349–1352
- Tarabya Swa Saw Ke, king of Ava Kingdom, 1367–1400
- Tarabya of Ava, king of Ava, 1400
- Tarabya I of Pakhan, governor of Pagan (1413–c. 1433) and governor of Pakhan (1390–1413)
- Tarabya Minye Kyawhtin of Pakhan, governor of Pakhan, 1413–1426
- Tarabya of Toungoo, viceroy of Toungoo, 1440–1446
