= Kyawswa =

Kyawswa (Burmese: ကျော်စွာ) is a common Burmese name. It was formerly a royal title during the days of Burmese monarchy. The name may mean:

- Kyawswa of Pagan: King of Pagan (1289–1297)
- Kyawswa I of Pinya: King of Pinya (1344–1350)
- Kyawswa II of Pinya: King of Pinya (1350–1359)

It is not to be confused with the name Kyaswa (Burmese: ကျစွာ), also the title of kings.

- Kyaswa: King of Pagan (1235–1251)
- Kyaswa of Sagaing: King of Sagaing Kingdom (1339–1349)
