= Shin Hpa of Pagan =

Shin Hpa ရှင်ဘား

Queen consort of Burma
- Tenure: c. 1258 – 1287
- Born: c. 1240
- Spouse: Narathihapate
- Issue: Kyawswa of Pagan
- House: Pagan
- Religion: Theravada Buddhism

Shin Hpa (Burmese: ရှင်ဘား, pronounced [ʃɪ̀ɴ pʰá]) was a queen consort of King Narathihapate of the Pagan Dynasty of Burma (Myanmar). She was the mother of King Kyawswa of Pagan; the paternal grandmother of King Uzana I of Pinya and Queen Saw Hnaung of Sagaing; and a great grandmother of King Swa Saw Ke of Ava. Through Uzana, she was an ancestor of Toungoo kings Mingyi Nyo, Tabinshwehti and Nanda. Through Saw Hnaung, she was an ancestor of Sagaing kings from Kyaswa to Tarabya II as well as King Thado Minbya of Ava. Through Swa Saw Ke, she was an ancestor of Ava kings from Swa to Thihathu, as well as Toungoo kings from Bayinnaung to Mahadhammaraza Dipadi.

== Bibliography ==
- Royal Historical Commission of Burma (1832). Hmannan Yazawin (in Burmese). Vol. 1–3 (2003 ed.). Yangon: Ministry of Information, Myanmar.
