= Nanda Pakyan =

- နန္ဒပကြံ

Chief Minister
- In office 1335/36–1350s
- Monarchs: Anawrahta I Kyaswa; Anawrahta II; Tarabya II

Minister
- In office c. 1327–1335/36
- Monarch: Tarabya I

Personal details
- Died: c. 1350s Sagaing

Military service
- Allegiance: Sagaing Kingdom
- Branch/service: Royal Sagaing Army
- Years of service: 1339–1352?
- Rank: Commander-in-chief

Nanda Pakyan (Burmese: နန္ဒပကြံ, pronounced [nàɴda̰ bədʑàɴ]; also spelled Ananda Pakyan; c. 1280s – c. 1350s) was chief minister of Sagaing from the 1330s to the 1350s. The powerful minister placed at least three kings Kyaswa (r. 1339−49), Anawrahta II (r. 1349) and Tarabya II (r. 1349−52) on the throne, became the commander-in-chief, and ran the country.

== Brief ==
Nanda Pakyan, formally Ananda Pakyan, was in the service of King Tarabya I in 1335/36 when the king was overthrown by his own son Shwetaungtet. The minister served the usurper but having taken bribes from the dowager queen Saw Hnaung, kept quiet about the whereabouts of her young children who were the legitimate claimants to the throne. Chronicles suggest he may have been involved with the queen herself. Nonetheless, the minister's loyalties ultimately lay with himself. When loyalists of the deposed king attacked the palace and killed Shwetaungtet, he led the palace guards and put down the loyalists, and killed Tarabya himself.

He then placed Kyaswa (r. 1339−49), the 16-year-old eldest son of the founder of the kingdom Saw Yun, on the throne. The new king appointed Nanda Pakyan chief minister and commander-in-chief with the title of Thubarit. The minister was the power behind the throne, and practically ran the country. He also placed the next two kings Anawrahta II (r. 1349) and Tarabya II (r. 1349−52) on the throne. He might have had a hand in the following king Thihapate's accession. (Note: The terse language of Zatadawbon Yazawin is ambiguous. (Zata 1960: 44) says Thihapate was a "son of Amat Yo" ("အမတ်ရိုးသား"). It could technically mean that he was son of an amat (court minister) named Yo; it is more likely to mean that he was of the lineage of ministers. Furthermore, Zata mentions Chief Minister–General Nanda Pakyan in the prior sentence. It is not clear at least in modern Burmese if the amat in the following sentence refers to Nanda Pakyan, or a new concept entirely. Since Nanda Pakyan put the three prior kings of Sagaing on the throne, the powerful minister may have put his own son Thihapate on the throne. Later chronicles may have found Zata's reporting ambiguous as well. None of the later chronicles explicitly mentions who the father of Thihapate was.)

== Bibliography ==
- Royal Historians of Burma (1960) [c. 1680]. U Hla Tin (Hla Thamein) (ed.). Zatadawbon Yazawin (in Burmese). Historical Research Directorate of the Union of Burma.
- Kala, U (2006) [1724]. Maha Yazawin (in Burmese). Vol. 1–3 (4th printing ed.). Yangon: Ya-Pyei Publishing.
- Maha Sithu (2012) [1798]. Kyaw Win; Thein Hlaing (eds.). Yazawin Thit (in Burmese). Vol. 1–3 (2nd ed.). Yangon: Ya-Pyei Publishing.
- Royal Historical Commission of Burma (2003) [1832]. Hmannan Yazawin (in Burmese). Vol. 1–3. Yangon: Ministry of Information, Myanmar.
