= Saw Pale =

Saw Pale was a Burmese royal name.

It may mean:

- Saw Pale of Pinya: Duchess of Taungdwin
- Saw Pale of Yamethin: Duchess of Yamethin
- Saw Pale of Nyaungyan: Duchess of Nyaungyan
