= Theinkhathu Saw Hnaung =

Theinkhathu of Sagu; သိင်္ခသူ စောနှောင်း

Governor of Sagu
- Reign: c. 1360s – 1390s
- Successor: Theinkhathu II of Sagu
- King: Swa Saw Ke
- Born: c. 1320s Taungdwin
- Died: in or after 1393
- Spouse: Saw Myat
- Issue: Theinkhathu II
- House: Pinya
- Father: Thihapate I of Taungdwin
- Mother: Saw Pale of Pinya
- Religion: Theravada Buddhism

Theinkhathu Saw Hnaung (Burmese: သိင်္ခသူ စောနှောင်း, pronounced [θèiɴgəðù sɔ́ n̥áʊɴ]) was governor of Sagu in the Kingdom of Ava in the late 14th century. He was a grandson of King Thihathu of Pinya, and was one of the four top commanders of King Swa Saw Ke of Ava. He successfully resisted King Thado Minbya's multiple attempts to take his home region (1365−67). He later submitted to Swa. He served in the war against the southern Hanthawaddy Kingdom between 1386 and 1391 and defended the kingdom against the northern state of Mohnyin.

Queen Shin Bo-Me of Ava was his grand daughter.

== Military service ==
Saw Hnaung was one of the four top generals of King Swa. The other three were Thilawa of Yamethin, Tuyin of Inyi, and Min Pale of Paukmyaing.

Campaign	Duration	Troops commanded	Notes
Ava–Hanthawaddy War (1385–1391)	1385–86	1 regiment	Commanded a regiment in the First Army (7000 men in 9 regiments) that invaded Hanthawaddy via Toungoo
Ava–Hanthawaddy War (1385–1391)	1386–87	1 regiment	Commanded a regiment in the riverine force (12,000 men in 11 regiments)
Ava–Hanthawaddy War (1385–1391)	1390–91	1 regiment	Commanded a regiment in the riverine force (12,000 men in 12 regiments)
Mohnyin–Ava War	1392–93	Army (strength unknown)	Commander-in-chief;(Battle of Myedu and battle of Sagaing); Commander of Cavalry Corps (Battle of Shangon)

== Ancestry ==
The following is his ancestry according to Hmannan Yazawin chronicle. Queen Shin Bo-Me of Ava was his granddaughter.

Ancestry of Theinkhathu Saw Hnaung

8. unnamed
4. Thray Sithu
9. unnamed
2. Thihapate I of Taungdwin (Pwint Hla Oo)
10. unnamed
5. unnamed
11. unnamed
1. Saw Hnaung
12. Theinkha Bo
6. Thihathu
13. Lady Myinsaing
3. Saw Pale of Pinya
14. unnamed
7. Yadanabon of Pinya
15. unnamed

== Bibliography ==
- Burma Translation Society (1973). "Gov. Thilawa of Yamethin". Myanma Swezon Kyan (in Burmese). Vol. 13 (1 ed.). Yangon: Sarpay Beikman.
- Harvey, G. E. (1925). History of Burma: From the Earliest Times to 10 March 1824. London: Frank Cass & Co. Ltd.
- Htin Aung, Maung (1967). A History of Burma. New York and London: Cambridge University Press.
- Kala, U (2006) [1724]. Maha Yazawin (in Burmese). Vol. 1–3 (4th printing ed.). Yangon: Ya-Pyei Publishing.
- Maha Sithu (2012) [1798]. Kyaw Win; Thein Hlaing (eds.). Yazawin Thit (in Burmese). Vol. 1–3 (2nd ed.). Yangon: Ya-Pyei Publishing.
- Royal Historical Commission of Burma (2003) [1832]. Hmannan Yazawin (in Burmese). Vol. 1–3. Yangon: Ministry of Information, Myanmar.

Theinkhathu Saw Hnaung Ava Kingdom Born: c. 1320s Died: c. 1390s
Royal titles
Preceded by	Governor of Sagu c. 1360s – 1390s	Succeeded by Theinkhathu II of Sagu
