= Saw Pa Oh of Sagaing =

Saw Pa Oh စောပအို

Queen consort of Sagaing
- Tenure: c. 1340 – c. March 1349
- Predecessor: unknown
- Successor: unknown
- Born: c. 1320s Pinya, Pinya Kingdom
- Died: Unknown; Ava (Inwa), Ava Kingdom
- Spouse: Kyaswa
- Issue: Saw Sala
- House: Pinya
- Father: Uzana I of Pinya
- Religion: Theravada Buddhism

Saw Pa Oh (Burmese: စောပအို, (Note: Her name Saw Pa Oh (စောပအို) was not a typical name—royal, commoner or otherwise. As seen in (Maha Yazawin Vol. 1 2006: 270) and (Yazawin Thit Vol. 1 2012: 172), the name was a variant spelling of a village in Sagaing named Saw Put Oh (စောပွတ်အိုး) where King Saw Yun founded a hereditary cavalry battalion in 1318/19. Thus Saw Pa Oh may have been a title of the queen, signifying that she was given Saw Pa Oh in fief.) pronounced [sɔ́ bə ʔò]) was a queen consort of King Kyaswa of Sagaing. She was a daughter of King Uzana I of Pinya. She and Kyaswa had at least one daughter named Saw Sala who became a queen of King Uzana II of Pinya.

== Bibliography ==
- Royal Historians of Burma (c. 1680). U Hla Tin (Hla Thamein) (ed.). Zatadawbon Yazawin (1960 ed.). Historical Research Directorate of the Union of Burma.
- Kala, U (1724). Maha Yazawin (in Burmese). Vol. 1–3 (2006, 4th printing ed.). Yangon: Ya-Pyei Publishing.
- Maha Sithu (2012) [1798]. Kyaw Win; Thein Hlaing (eds.). Yazawin Thit (in Burmese). Vol. 1–3 (2nd ed.). Yangon: Ya-Pyei Publishing.
- Royal Historical Commission of Burma (1832). Hmannan Yazawin (in Burmese). Vol. 1–3 (2003 ed.). Yangon: Ministry of Information, Myanmar.
- Than Tun (December 1959). "History of Burma: A.D. 1300–1400". Journal of Burma Research Society. XLII (II).

Saw Pa Oh of Sagaing Sagaing Kingdom Born: c. 1320s
Royal titles
Unknown	Queen consort of Sagaing c. 1340 – c. March 1349	Unknown
