= Saw Pale of Pinya =

Saw Pale စောပုလဲ

Duchess of Taungdwin
- Tenure: 1317 – ?
- Born: early 1300s Pinle; Myinsaing Regency
- Died: Unknown; Taungdwin
- Spouse: Thihapate I of Taungdwin
- Issue: Theinkhathu Saw Hnaung
- House: Pinya
- Father: Thihathu
- Mother: Yadanabon
- Religion: Theravada Buddhism

Saw Pale (Burmese: စောပုလဲ, pronounced [sɔ́ pəlɛ́]) was duchess of Taungdwin. She was the only daughter of Queen Yadanabon and King Thihathu. Her mother was a commoner concubine but was raised to queen by her father after her birth. She had one elder brother Saw Yun, who later became king of Sagaing. Pale was married off to Gov. Thihapate I of Taungdwin (known as "Pwint Hla Oo Thihapate") in 1317, ending the planned rebellion by Thihapate. Her son Saw Hnaung became a leading general in the reign of King Swa Saw Ke of Ava.

== Bibliography ==
- Royal Historical Commission of Burma (1832). Hmannan Yazawin (in Burmese). Vol. 1–3 (2003 ed.). Yangon: Ministry of Information, Myanmar.

Saw Pale of Pinya Pinya Kingdom Born: c. 1300s
Royal titles
Preceded by	Duchess of Taungdwin c. 1317 – ?	Succeeded by
