= Thihapate I of Taungdwin =

Thihapate I of Taungdwin; ပွင့်လှဦး သီဟပတေ့

Governor of Taungdwin
- Reign: by 1317 – c. 1350s?
- Predecessor: ?
- Successor: Thihapate II of Taungdwin
- Monarch: Thihathu (1310s–1325)
- Born: c. 1290s
- Died: 1350s?
- Spouse: Saw Pale of Pinya (Note: The 1724 chronicle Maha Yazawin (Maha Yazawin Vol. 1 2006: 261) says Thihathu wedded Saw Pale and Thihapate of Taungdwin to retain Taungdwin's support. The 1798 Yazawin Thit (Yazawin Thit Vol 1 2012: 163) says Saw Pale was married to Thihapate of Yamethin, not Taungdwin. The chronicle Hmannan Yazawin (1832) stays with the Maha Yazawin's narrative.); Daughter of Thettawshay I of Myinsaing
- Issue: Theinkhathu Saw Hnaung; Thihapate II of Taungdwin
- Father: Thray Sithu

Pwint-Hla-Oo Thihapate (Burmese: ပွင့်လှဦး သီဟပတေ့, [pwìɰ̃ l̥a̰ ú θìha̰pətḛ]) was governor of Taungdwin from the 1310s to c. 1350s. He was the father of Ava-period general Theinkhathu Saw Hnaung, and a great-grandfather of Queen Shin Bo-Me of Ava. He was also an ancestor of Queen Shin Myat Hla of Ava.

== Brief ==
According to the royal chronicles, Thihapate was governor of Taungdwin in 1317/18 (Note: (Maha Yazawin Vol. 1 260): Six years after the founding of Pinya, Gov. Thawun Nge of Toungoo did not send tribute -- i.e. 1317/18. According to (Sein Lwin Lay 2006: 19–20), Thawun Nge assassinated Gov. Thawun Gyi c. 23 June 1317, and seized the governorship of Toungoo.) when nearby Toungoo (Taungoo) revolted. It was during the Toungoo rebellion that King Thihathu of Pinya wedded Thihapate to his daughter Saw Pale to retain Thihapate's support.

According to the Maha Yazawin chronicle, the couple had three children: Theinkhathu Saw Hnaung, Theinkhathu the younger, and Min Ogga. However, the Hmannan Yazawin chronicle mentions only Saw Hnaung. Saw Hnaung later became governor of Sagu, and one of the leading generals in the service of King Swa Saw Ke of Ava. Queen Shin Bo-Me of Ava was a great-granddaughter of Thihapate I of Taungdwin.

According to the Yazawin Thit and Hmannan chronicles, he was married to a daughter of Thettawshay of Myinsaing. Through this union, he was an ancestor of Queen Shin Myat Hla of Ava. (Note: (Hmannan Vol. 2 2003: 62–63): Queen Myat Hla's fresco writings from the Shwe Kyaung Monastery in Pagan (Bagan), her father was Thihapate II of Taungdwin and her paternal grandfather was Thihapate I.)

It is unclear as to when he died. The next mention of the governor of Taungdwin in the chronicles is in 1364 when Thihapate II of Taungdwin was one of the many southern Pinya governors that had refused to submit to the new king Thado Minbya.

== Bibliography ==
- Kala, U (2006) [1724]. Maha Yazawin (in Burmese). Vol. 1–3 (4th printing ed.). Yangon: Ya-Pyei Publishing.
- Maha Sithu (2012) [1798]. Kyaw Win; Thein Hlaing (eds.). Yazawin Thit (in Burmese). Vol. 1–3 (2nd ed.). Yangon: Ya-Pyei Publishing.
- Sein Lwin Lay, Kahtika U (2006) [1968]. Min Taya Shwe Hti and Bayinnaung: Ketumadi Taungoo Yazawin (in Burmese) (2nd printing ed.). Yangon: Yan Aung Sarpay.
- Royal Historical Commission of Burma (2003) [1832]. Hmannan Yazawin (in Burmese). Vol. 1–3. Yangon: Ministry of Information, Myanmar.

Thihapate I of Taungdwin Pinya
| Preceded by ? | Governor of Taungdwin by 1317 – c. 1350s | Succeeded by Thihapate II of Taungdwin |
