= Taungdwingyi Cultural Museum =

Museum in Taungdwingyi, Myanmar

Coordinates: 20°00′37″N 95°32′49″E

- တောင်တွင်းကြီးယဉ်ကျေးမှုပြတိုက်
- Established: 1996
- Location: Taungdwingyi, Magway District, Magway Division, Myanmar
- Type: Cultural Museum
- Accreditation: Ministry of Religious Affairs and Culture (Myanmar)

The Taungdwingyi Cultural Museum is a museum in Myanmar that displays cultural materials of the Pyu Period excavated from ancient city. It houses lacquer wares, clay-pipes, Pyu coins, glass-wares, Buddha images, burial, palanquins and divans located in Near Shwe Inntaung Pagoda, Taungdwingyi, Magway District, Magway Division (Upper Myanmar).

It was established in December 1996. Admission fees is 2 US $ and opening hour is from 10:00 am to 3:30 pm (from Tuesday to Sunday).
