= Shwetaungtet =

Anawrahta I of Sagaing Shwetaungtet ရွှေတောင်တက်

King of Sagaing
- Reign: 1335/36 – c. August 1339
- Predecessor: Tarabya I
- Successor: Kyaswa
- Chief Minister: Nanda Pakyan
- Born: 23 September 1313; Sunday, 2nd waxing of Thadingyut 675 ME; Pinya, Pinya Kingdom
- Died: c. August 1339 (aged 25) c. Tawthalin 701 ME; Sagaing, Sagaing Kingdom
- Consort: unknown
- Issue: unknown
- House: Myinsaing
- Father: Tarabya I
- Mother: unknown
- Religion: Theravada Buddhism

Thiri Thihathura Shwetaungtet (Burmese: သီရိ သီဟသူရ ရွှေတောင်တက် [θìɹḭ θìha̰θùja̰ ʃwè dàʊɰ̃ dɛʔ]; also Anawrahta I of Sagaing; 1313–1339) was king of Sagaing from 1335/36 to 1339. He came to power by deposing his father Tarabya. He was assassinated three years later by the loyalists of his father.

== Brief ==
His father Tarabya was a commoner stepson of King Thihathu of Pinya; his mother, whose identity is unknown, may have been of royal descent. (Note: Tarabya was adopted in 1298, and grew up as an adopted son of Thihathu, co-regent of Myinsaing. Thus, Tarabya likely married a royal.) Shwedaungtet was likely born in either 1313 in Pinya or c. 1312 in Pinle. (Note: Yazawin Thit and Hmannan imply that he was born in Pinle whereas Zata implies that he was born in Pinya. (Yazawin Thit Vol. 1 2012: 174) and (Hmannan Vol. 1 2003: 390) imply that he was born c. 1312, Zata says he was born in September 1313. Per (Hmannan Vol. 1 2003: 370), Thihathu moved to Pinya on 7 February 1313 from Pinle.) From 1315 onwards, he grew up in Sagaing as Tarabya followed Prince Saw Yun's insurrection of Thihathu in 1315.

Shwedaungtet's stature likely grew after his father succeeded Saw Yun as ruler of Sagaing in 1327. While Tarabya may have been a regent on behalf of Saw Yun's young children—the eldest son Kyaswa was not yet 4—Shwedaungtet was nearly ten years older than Kyaswa. Although Shwedaungtet's claim to the throne was weaker than those of the three sons of Saw Yun, he eyed the throne nonetheless. He decided to act before his cousins reached teenage years. In 1335/36, (Note: All main four royal chronicles say that Tarabya was dethroned in 698 ME (29 March 1336 to 28 March 1337). But inscriptional evidence per (Than Tun 1959: 126) shows that Tarabya lost power in 697 ME (29 March 1335 to 28 March 1336).) he successfully staged a palace coup and imprisoned his father.

The usurper, now with the reign names of Anawrahta and Thiri Thihathura (Note: The name Shwedaungtet, "Climber of Golden Mountain" itself was a title; the "Mountain" here refers to the throne.) however could not eliminate Saw Yun's children. The dowager Queen Saw Hnaung with the help of Chief Minister Nanda Pakyan hid the children (and Thado Hsinhtein, the husband of the eldest child Soe Min Kodawgyi) in faraway Mindon inside Pinya territory. She had to continue bribing the powerful minister, who may have also been her lover.

In 1339, Shwedaungtet located the whereabouts of his cousins, led an expedition into Pinya territory, brought them back to Sagaing. But he was assassinated c. August 1339, (Note: Based on chronicle reporting their ages at death, Tarabya and Shwetaungtet died sometime between 23 July 1339 and 4 September 1339. Per (Zata 1960: 43, 70), Shwetaungtet died at age 25, meaning he lost power before he turned 26 on the 2nd waxing of Thadingyut 701 ME (Sat, 4 September 1339). Per (Zata 1960: 43), Tarabya died at age 42 (43rd year), meaning on or after the 3rd waning of Wagaung 701 ME (23 July 1339).) soon after he got back to the Sagaing Palace, by the loyalists of his father the deposed king. Chief Minister Nanda Pakyan's forces ultimately defeated Tarabya's loyalists in the ensuing battle. The powerful minister ordered the execution of Tarabya, and placed Kyaswa on the throne.

== Chronicle reporting differences ==
The royal chronicles do not agree on his birth, death and reign dates.

Source	Birth–Death	Age	Reign	Length of reign	Reference
Zatadawbon Yazawin	23 September 1313 – 1339	28 [sic] (29th year)	1336/37–1339/40	3	(Note: Zata (Zata 1960: 43, 70) erroneously says he died in his 29th year even though Zata itself says he was born in 675 ME and died in 701 ME, meaning he died in his 26th year. It is a case in which the numeral ၆ (6) was mis-copied as ၉ (9).)
Zatadawbon Yazawin (reconciled)	23 September 1313 – 1339	25 (26th year)	1336/37–1339/40	3	(Note: Zata (Zata 1960: 43, 70) erroneously says he died in his 29th year even though Zata itself says he was born in 675 ME and died in 701 ME, meaning he died in his 26th year. It is a case in which the numeral ၆ (6) was mis-copied as ၉ (9).)
Maha Yazawin	c. 1321–1339/40	18 (19th year)	1336/37–1339/40	3	
Yazawin Thit	c. 1312–1339/40	27 (28th year)	1336/37–1339/40	3	
Hmannan Yazawin	c. 1312–1339/40	27 (28th year)	1336/37–1339/40	3	

== Bibliography ==
- Royal Historians of Burma (1960) [c. 1680]. U Hla Tin (Hla Thamein) (ed.). Zatadawbon Yazawin (in Burmese). Historical Research Directorate of the Union of Burma.
- Kala, U (2006) [1724]. Maha Yazawin (in Burmese). Vol. 1–3 (4th printing ed.). Yangon: Ya-Pyei Publishing.
- Maha Sithu (2012) [1798]. Kyaw Win; Thein Hlaing (eds.). Yazawin Thit (in Burmese). Vol. 1–3 (2nd ed.). Yangon: Ya-Pyei Publishing.
- Royal Historical Commission of Burma (2003) [1832]. Hmannan Yazawin (in Burmese). Vol. 1–3. Yangon: Ministry of Information, Myanmar.
- Than Tun (December 1959). "History of Burma: A.D. 1300–1400". Journal of Burma Research Society. XLII (II).

Shwetaungtet Myinsaing Dynasty Born: 23 September 1313 Died: c. August 1339
Regnal titles
Preceded by Tarabya I	King of Sagaing; 1335/36 – c. August 1339	Succeeded by Kyaswa
