= Khin Nyo =

Khin Nyo ခင်ညို
- Born: c. 1300
- Military career
- Allegiance: Pinya Kingdom
- Branch: Royal Pinya Army
- Service years: 1320s
- Rank: Commander

Nga Khin Nyo (Burmese: ငခင်ညို, [ŋə kʰɪ̀ɴ ɲò]) was a Royal Pinya Army commander. He is known in Burmese history for his refusal to assassinate King Saw Yun of Sagaing after having eaten a bowl of rice that belonged to Saw Yun. His lord Prince Kyawswa, who had ordered the assassination, accepted the commander's rationale, and awarded lavish gifts to Khin Nyo for his conscience and loyalty.

== Brief ==
=== Background ===
Khin Nyo was an officer in the service of Prince Kyawswa, then governor of Pinle and heir-presumptive of the Pinya Kingdom. After the death of King Thihathu in 1325, the northern part of the kingdom, Sagaing, formally broke away. It was a mere formality; Sagaing had been de facto independent since 1315. The root cause of secession was Thihathu's appointment of his adopted son Uzana I as heir-apparent. Thihathu's eldest son Saw Yun vehemently opposed the appointment and left with his followers to Sagaing, across the river in 1315. Saw Yun went on to fortify Sagaing, and repulse Pinya's two attempts to retake it by 1317. Saw Yun nominally remained loyal to his father but the kingdom formally split into two after Thihathu's death.

=== Assassination attempt ===
Uzana succeeded the rump Pinya Kingdom but his half-brother Kyawswa, another natural son of Thihathu, remained a rival for the Pinya throne. Circa 1326, (Note: Since Thihathu died in 1325 per (Maha Yazawin Vol. 1 2006: 350, in the regnal tables by the editors) and Saw Yun died in 1327 per (Than Tun 1959: 126) and (Maha Yazawin Vol. 1 2006: 352, in the regnal tables by the editors), the assassination attempt must have happened sometime between 1325 and 1327. The chronicle Hmannan Yazawin (Hmannan Vol. 1 2003: 383) does not specify the exact year. The Yazawin Thit chronicle (Yazawin Thit Vol. 1 2012: 163) says the assassination attempt took place in the first year of Uzana I's reign in 681 ME (1319/1320). But Uzana came to power in 1325, per scholarship.) Kyawswa sent his trusted officer Khin Nyo to assassinate his half-brother Saw Yun. Chronicles recount that Khin Nyo, as ordered, went to Sagaing. He managed to enter the fortified city but had to hide in the woods outside the palace for three days. On the third night, he slipped past the guards and got inside the palace. On his way to the royal bedchamber, he saw cooked food (rice and beef) in a golden bowl at the shrine of the Mahagiri nat spirit. Not having had any food for three days, he could not resist and ate the food. He then entered the bedchamber, and saw that the king was sound asleep.

With his sword aimed at Saw Yun's head, he stood conflicted. Because he had just eaten the food donated by Saw Yun, according to Burmese Buddhist belief, he now owed a debt (kyezu, "obligation") to Saw Yun. The would-be assassin reasoned that the price of killing someone to whom he was indebted would be exorbitantly high: he would descend to the depths of Naraya, making his escape from samsara immensely longer. He decided against killing the king, and instead took the king's ruby-studded royal sword by the bed. The sword had been bestowed to Saw Yun by Thihathu, and Khin Nyo knew that his lords at Pinya would recognize it.

=== Aftermath ===
Chronicles continue that Khin Nyo returned to Pinle, expecting the full punishment for having failed to complete the assigned task. He presented the ruby studded sword of Saw Yun to Kyawswa, and explained why he did not carry out the task. To his surprise, Kyawswa did not punish him. After carefully considering Khin Nyo's explanation, the prince pronounced that if Khin Nyo genuinely believed in the debt of one bowl of rice, then he must be truly loyal to his lord, who had supported the commander and his family for years. Kyawswa awarded lavish gifts to Khin Nyo.

== Commemorations ==
- Nga Khin Nyo Road in North Dagon Township, Yangon

== Bibliography ==
- Htin Aung, Maung (1967). A History of Burma. New York and London: Cambridge University Press.
- Kala, U (1724). Maha Yazawin (in Burmese). Vol. 1–3 (2006, 4th printing ed.). Yangon: Ya-Pyei Publishing.
- Maha Sithu (1798). Myint Swe; Kyaw Win; Thein Hlaing (eds.). Yazawin Thit (in Burmese). Vol. 1–3 (2012, 2nd printing ed.). Yangon: Ya-Pyei Publishing.
- Royal Historical Commission of Burma (1832). Hmannan Yazawin (in Burmese). Vol. 1–3 (2003 ed.). Yangon: Ministry of Information, Myanmar.
