= Kyaswa of Sagaing =

Kyaswa of Sagaing စစ်ကိုင်း ကျစွာ

King of Sagaing
- Reign: c. August 1339 – c. March 1349
- Predecessor: Anawrahta I
- Successor: Anawrahta II
- Chief Minister: Nanda Pakyan
- Born: 9 April 1323; Saturday, 4th waxing of Kason 685 ME; Sagaing, Sagaing Kingdom
- Died: c. March 1349 (aged 25) c. Late Tagu 710 ME; Sagaing, Sagaing Kingdom
- Consort: Saw Pa Oh
- Issue: Saw Sala
- House: Myinsaing
- Father: Saw Yun
- Mother: Saw Hnaung
- Religion: Theravada Buddhism

Kyaswa of Sagaing (Burmese: ကျစွာ, pronounced [tɕa̰zwà]; also known as Kyawswa; 1323–1349) was king of Sagaing from 1339 to 1349. The eldest son of the founder of the kingdom Saw Yun (r. 1315−27) was placed on the throne by Chief Minister Nanda Pakyan who ran the country.

== Early life ==
Kyaswa was born to Queen Saw Hnaung and King Saw Yun of Sagaing on 9 April 1323. He was the second of the couple's four children, and a grandson of kings Thihathu of Pinya and Kyawswa of Pagan. His father died in February 1327. Because Kyaswa, the eldest son, was not yet four years old, his half-uncle Tarabya I succeeded the throne, marrying Saw Hnaung as his chief queen. Though it is unclear if Tarabya ever planned to hand over the reins to Kyaswa when the latter became an adult, Kyaswa, as the eldest son of Saw Yun and as the eldest son of Tarabya's chief queen Saw Hnaung, was at least the heir presumptive.

The arrangement lasted until 1335/36 when Tarabya's own son Shwetaungtet overthrew his father and seized the throne. Fearing the life of her children, Saw Hnaung with the help of Chief Minister Nanda Pakyan sent the children (and Thado Hsinhtein, the husband of the eldest child Soe Min) to Mindon, deep inside Pinya's territory. For the next three years, Saw Hnaung, who may have even become a lover of Nanda Pakyan, kept bribing the powerful minister to keep quiet.

== Accession ==
Then a series of events led Kyaswa to the throne. In 1339, Shwetaungtet, having discovered their whereabouts, came to Mindon with an expeditionary force, and brought them back to Sagaing. But upon return to the palace, loyalists of the deposed king Tarabya ambushed and killed Shwetaungtet although they were later defeated by the palace guards. Nanda Pakyan had Tarabya executed, and placed Kyaswa on the throne. Kyaswa took the reign name of Thiri Tri Bhawanaditya Pawara Dhamma Yaza at his accession.

== Reign ==
His first act as king was to reappoint Nanda Pakyan as the Chief Minister and Commander-in-Chief with the title of Thubarit. The 16-year-old monarch essentially allowed Nanda Pakyan's court to continue running the kingdom. His reign was largely peaceful. In Central Burma, he secured peace with Sagaing's cross-river rival Pinya by marrying Saw Pa Oh, daughter of King Uzana I of Pinya. (The peace between the two kingdoms was maintained even after Uzana I was pushed out by Kyawswa I between 1340 and 1344.) In the north, the Shan states were still fighting a war of independence against their Mongol overlords, and were not yet the threat they would become to Central Burmese states in the late 1350s.

His reign lasted over nine years. Surviving inscriptions from the era report no particular issues during his reign. Kyaswa left an inscription in 1343/44 at the Thamanda Pagoda (on the route between Mindon and Sagaing) where he and his two queens donated land and a monastery. The inscription also recounts his exile in Mindon and the attack by Shwetaungtet. Another contemporary inscription states the king gave presents to his nephew Prince Rahula (future King Thado Minbya) on 24 January 1347. He died c. March 1349. (Note: Contemporary inscriptions suggest a few weeks' gap between Kyaswa's death and Nawrahta Minye's accession. One inscription (Than Tun 1959: 127) says Kyaswa died in 710 ME (29 March 1348 to 28 March 1349). An inscription donated by Minye himself (Yazawin Thit Vol. 1 2012: 175, footnote 2) states that he came to power in 711 ME (29 March 1349 to 28 March 1350), and shows that he was still alive on Sunday, 13th waning of Tazaungmon 711 ME (8 November 1349). Since an inscription by Princess Soe Min (Yazawin Thit Vol. 1 2012: 175−176) shows that Kyaswa's successor Minye reigned for seven months in 711 ME, Minye came to power no earlier than 14th waning of Tagu 711 ME (17 April 1349). But if the inscription referenced in (Than Tun 1959: 127) is accurate, Kyaswa died no later than 28 March 1349, the last day of 710 ME.)

== Family ==
Kyaswa had at least two queens. One of his queens was Saw Pa Oh; their daughter Saw Sala later became a queen of King Uzana II of Pinya.

== Chronicle reporting differences ==
The royal chronicles do not agree on his birth and death dates.

| Source | Birth–Death | Age | Reign | Length of reign | Reference |
|---|---|---|---|---|---|
| Zatadawbon Yazawin | 9 April 1323 – 1344 | 20 (21st year) | 1339–1344 | 5 | (Note: Zata's horoscope section (Zata 1960: 70) says he was born on Saturday, 4th nekkhat of the 1st month of 658 ME. But 658 ME is a typographical error since Zata's own regnal lists section (Zata 1960: 43) says he was born in 685 ME. Saturday, 4th waxing of Kason 685 ME = 9 April 1323.) |
| Maha Yazawin | c. 1324–1344/45 | 20 (21st year) | 1339/40–1344/45 | 5 | |
| Yazawin Thit | c. 1318–1349/50 | 31 (32nd year) | 1339/40–1349/50 | 10 | (Note: See (Yazawin Thit Vol. 1 2012: 174) and (Hmannan Vol. 1 2003: 391) for the chronicles' death year and implied birth year for Kyaswa. Yazawin Thit rejects earlier chronicles' birth date of 1323/24, and pushes it to c. 1318 because it (Yazawin Thit Vol. 1 2012: 173) has Saw Yun dead by 30 April 1322 (Friday, 1st waning of Kason 684 ME). Yazawin Thit and Hmannan, which follows Yazawin Thit, are incorrect according to a contemporary inscription (Than Tun 1959: 126), which shows that Saw Yun died on or before 5 February 1327 (Full moon of Tabaung 688 ME). This means Yazawin Thit's "correction" was most probably unwarranted, and Kyaswa likely was born in 1323/24 as reported in earlier chronicles.) |
| Hmannan Yazawin | c. 1318–1349/50 | 31 (32nd year) | 1339/40–1349/50 | 10 | |

== Bibliography ==
- Royal Historians of Burma (1960) [c. 1680]. U Hla Tin (Hla Thamein) (ed.). Zatadawbon Yazawin (in Burmese). Historical Research Directorate of the Union of Burma.
- Kala, U (2006) [1724]. Maha Yazawin (in Burmese). Vol. 1–3 (4th printing ed.). Yangon: Ya-Pyei Publishing.
- Maha Sithu (2012) [1798]. Kyaw Win; Thein Hlaing (eds.). Yazawin Thit (in Burmese). Vol. 1–3 (2nd ed.). Yangon: Ya-Pyei Publishing.
- Royal Historical Commission of Burma (2003) [1832]. Hmannan Yazawin (in Burmese). Vol. 1–3. Yangon: Ministry of Information, Myanmar.
- Than Tun (December 1959). "History of Burma: A.D. 1300–1400". Journal of Burma Research Society. XLII (II).
- Than Tun (1964). Studies in Burmese History (in Burmese). Vol. 1. Yangon: Maha Dagon.

Kyaswa of Sagaing Myinsaing Dynasty Born: 9 April 1323 Died: c. March 1349
Regnal titles
| Preceded by Anawrahta I | King of Sagaing c. August 1339 – c. March 1349 | Succeeded by Anawrahta II |
