= Yadanabon of Pinya =

Yadanabon of Pinya ရတနာပုံ

Queen of the Northern Palace of Pinya
- Tenure: 7 February 1313 – c. February 1325
- Predecessor: new office
- Successor: unknown

Queen of the Northern Palace of Pinle
- Tenure: 1300s – 7 February 1313
- Predecessor: new office
- Successor: disestablished
- Born: c. 1280s Linyin
- Died: Pinya
- Spouse: unnamed Thihathu
- Issue: Tarabya I Saw Yun; Saw Pale
- House: Pinya
- Religion: Theravada Buddhism

Yadanabon (Burmese: ရတနာပုံ, pronounced [jədənàbòʊɴ]) was one of the two queens consort of King Thihathu of Pinya. She was also the mother of kings Saw Yun and Tarabya I of Sagaing.

The queen was a commoner from a small village called Linyin, located somewhere in the north. She may have been an ethnic Shan. (Note: The chronicles (Hmannan Vol. 1 2003: 371–372) do not mention her ethnicity, stating only that she was from the north. But British colonial scholarship calls her an ethnic Shan (and indeed Thihathu and his brothers full Shans): See (Phayre 1967: 59–60) and (Harvey 1925: 75–81), for example.) In 1298, she was a widow with a 1-year-old child travelling south when she met Thihathu, who was on a hunting trip. Thihathu, who had just founded the Myinsaing Kingdom with his two elder brothers, took her as a concubine. She gave birth to his first male child, Saw Yun, a year later. She remained a concubine until after she gave birth to a daughter, Saw Pale. She was raised to be the Queen of the Northern Palace.

The queen's descendants include kings of Sagaing from Saw Yun to Tarabya II, as well as King Thado Minbya, the founder of Ava Kingdom. (Note: See the regnal list of Sagaing in (Harvey 1925: 366).) Furthermore, chief queens consorts of Ava Shin Bo-Me and Shin Myat Hla were her descendants.

== Bibliography ==
- Harvey, G. E. (1925). History of Burma: From the Earliest Times to 10 March 1824. London: Frank Cass & Co. Ltd.
- Phayre, Lt. Gen. Sir Arthur P. (1883). History of Burma (1967 ed.). London: Susil Gupta.
- Royal Historical Commission of Burma (1832). Hmannan Yazawin (in Burmese). Vol. 1–3 (2003 ed.). Yangon: Ministry of Information, Myanmar.

Yadanabon of Pinya Pinya Kingdom Born: c. 1280s Died: ?
Royal titles
New title	Queen of the Northern Palace of Pinya; 1313–1325	Unknown
New title	Queen of the Northern Palace of Pinle; 1300s–1313	None; Myinsaing Kingdom renamed as Pinya Kingdom
