= Saw Hnaung of Sagaing =

Kodawgyi Saw Hnaung ကိုယ်တော်ကြီး စောနှောင်း

Chief queen consort of Sagaing
- Tenure: 16 May 1315 – 1335/36
- Predecessor: new office
- Successor: unknown
- Born: c. 1296; Pagan (Bagan)
- Died: Unknown; Sagaing
- Spouse: Saw Yun; Tarabya I
- Issue: Kyaswa; Nawrahta Minye; Tarabya II; Soe Min Kodawgyi
- House: Sagaing
- Father: Kyawswa of Pagan
- Mother: Saw Soe of Pagan
- Religion: Theravada Buddhism

Saw Hnaung (Burmese: စောနှောင်း, pronounced [sɔ́ n̥áʊɴ]; also known as Kodawgyi) was the Chief queen consort of kings Saw Yun and Tarabya I of Sagaing. She was the mother of three kings of Sagaing: Kyaswa, Nawrahta Minye and Tarabya II, and the maternal grandmother of King Thado Minbya, the founder of Ava. She was also a paternal aunt of King Swa Saw Ke of Ava.

== Bibliography ==
- Royal Historical Commission of Burma (1832). Hmannan Yazawin (in Burmese). Vol. 1–3 (2003 ed.). Yangon: Ministry of Information, Myanmar.
- Than Tun (December 1959). "History of Burma: A.D. 1300–1400". Journal of Burma Research Society. XLII (II).

Saw Hnaung of Sagaing Sagaing Kingdom Born: c. 1296
Royal titles
New title	Chief queen consort of Sagaing; 1315–1335/36	Unknown
