= Tarabya I of Sagaing =

Tarabya I တရဖျားကြီး

King of Sagaing
- Reign: 5 February 1327 – 1335/36
- Predecessor: Saw Yun
- Successor: Anawrahta I
- Chief Minister: Nanda Pakyan
- Born: 8 July 1297; Monday, 2nd waning of 2nd Waso 659 ME
- Died: c. August 1339 (aged 42) c. Tawthalin 701 ME; Sagaing
- Consort: Saw Hnaung
- Issue: Anawrahta I
- House: Myinsaing
- Mother: Yadanabon of Pinya
- Religion: Theravada Buddhism

Tarabya I (Burmese: တရဖျားကြီး, pronounced [təja̰pʰjá dʑí];1297–1339) was king of Sagaing from 1327 to 1335/36. He succeeded King Saw Yun, his maternal half-brother. In 1335/36, he was brought put under arrest by his own son Shwetaungtet. The deposed king managed to have Shwetaungtet killed in 1339 but he himself was killed by Chief Minister Nanda Pakyan.

== Brief ==
Tarabya was the only child of a commoner couple from Linyin in northern Burma. His mother may have been an ethnic Shan. (Note: The chronicles (Hmannan Vol. 1 2003: 371–372) do not mention her ethnicity, stating only that she was from the north. But British colonial scholarship calls her an ethnic Shan (and indeed Thihathu and his brothers full Shans): See (Phayre 1967: 59–60) and (Harvey 1925: 75–81), for example.) His mother became a widow soon after his birth. She and her 1-year old were travelling south in 1298 when she met Thihathu, who was on a hunting trip. Thihathu, who had just founded the Myinsaing Kingdom with his two elder brothers, took her as a concubine. His mother was eventually raised to queen with the title of Yadanabon after his half-siblings Saw Yun and Saw Pale were born. Tarabya grew up at Thihathu's palace at Pinle, alongside his half-siblings as well as Uzana, biological son of King Kyawswa of Pagan, whom Thihathu had adopted as his own son. The family moved to Pinya in 1313 when Thihathu became the sole ruler of the Kingdom of Myinsaing–Pinya.

In 1315, Tarabya supported his half-brother Saw Yun's decision to revolt against Thihathu, and the brothers moved to Sagaing. In the following years, Tarabya became the deputy of Saw Yun, who managed to established himself as the de facto ruler of northern Upper Burma (present-day Sagaing Region and northern Mandalay Region). After Thihathu's death in 1325, Saw Yun officially broke away from Pinya and founded the Sagaing Kingdom.

The commoner became the ruler of Sagaing on 5 February 1327 after Saw Yun had died leaving four young children. Tarabya may claimed more than a regent status. (A contemporary inscription left by his mother says that Tarabya ascended the throne for he was the eldest [adopted] son of King Thihathu.) He raised Saw Yun's chief queen Saw Hnaung as his own chief queen. He did not harm any of Saw Yun's and Saw Hnaung's children who presumably had the rightful claim to the throne.

His reign lasted over eight years. In 1335/36, (Note: All main four royal chronicles say that he was dethroned in 698 ME (29 March 1336 to 28 March 1337). But inscriptional evidence per (Than Tun 1959: 126) shows that he lost power in 697 ME (29 March 1335 to 28 March 1336).) Tarabya was dethroned and imprisoned by his son Shwetaungtet, following a dispute between his son and his junior queens. For the next three plus years, the dowager queen Saw Hnaung plotted to overthrow her stepson. She continued to bribe the powerful minister Nanda Pakyan to keep her four children hidden at Mindon. Circa August 1339, (Note: Based on chronicle reporting of their ages at death, Tarabya and Shwetaungtet died sometime between 23 July 1339 and 4 September 1339. Per (Zata 1960: 43, 70), Shwetaungtet died at age 25, meaning he lost power before he turned 26 on 2nd waxing of Thadingyut 701 ME (Sat, 4 September 1339). Per (Zata 1960: 43), Tarabya died at age 42, meaning on or after 3rd waning of Wagaung 701 ME (23 July 1339).) Tarabya organized a coup and got Shwetaungtet killed. But as he prepared to reclaim the throne, Tarabya himself was killed by Nanda Pakyan, who feared Tarabya's punishment for the latter's collaboration with Shwetaungtet.

== Chronicle reporting differences ==
Note that the chronicles do not agree on his birth and death dates, or reign dates.

Source	Birth–Death	Age	Reign	Length of reign	Reference
Zatadawbon Yazawin	8 July 1297 – 1339/40	42 (43rd year)	1330/31–1336/37	6	(Note: Zata's horoscope section (Zata 1960: 69) says he died in his 47th year but it is a typographical error. Zata's own list of Sagaing kings (Zata 1960: 43) says he died in 701 ME in his 43rd year. Burmese numerals ၃ (3) and ၇ (7) can be written similarly in longhand. Since he died in his 43rd year, he died after the 3rd waning of Wagaung 701 ME (23 July 1339)--701 ME was not a leap year; thus the 4th month was Wagaung. Moreover he died soon after his son Shwetaungtet, who died in 701 ME before his 26th birthday on the 2nd waxing of Thadingyut 701 ME (4 September 1339). It means Tarabya died sometime between the 3rd waning of Wagaung 701 ME (23 July 1339) and the 2nd waxing of Thadingyut 701 ME (4 September 1339).)
Maha Yazawin	c. 1297–1339/40	42 (43rd year)	1330/31–1336/37	6	
Yazawin Thit	c. 1299–1339/40	40 (41st year)	30 April 1322 – 1336/37	14	(Note: (Yazawin Thit Vol. 1 2012: 173): Tarabya I ascended the throne on Friday, 1st waning of Kason 684 ME (Saturday, 1 May 1322); if it was Friday, it should have been 30 April 1322.)
Hmannan Yazawin	c. 1299–1339/40	40 (41st year)	30 April 1322 – 1336/37	14	

== Bibliography ==
- Royal Historians of Burma (1960) [c. 1680]. U Hla Tin (Hla Thamein) (ed.). Zatadawbon Yazawin (in Burmese). Historical Research Directorate of the Union of Burma.
- Kala, U (2006) [1724]. Maha Yazawin (in Burmese). Vol. 1–3 (4th printing ed.). Yangon: Ya-Pyei Publishing.
- Maha Sithu (2012) [1798]. Kyaw Win; Thein Hlaing (eds.). Yazawin Thit (in Burmese). Vol. 1–3 (2nd ed.). Yangon: Ya-Pyei Publishing.
- Royal Historical Commission of Burma (2003) [1832]. Hmannan Yazawin (in Burmese). Vol. 1–3. Yangon: Ministry of Information, Myanmar.
- Than Tun (December 1959). "History of Burma: A.D. 1300–1400". Journal of Burma Research Society. XLII (II).

Tarabya I of Sagaing Myinsaing Dynasty Born: 8 July 1297 Died: c. August 1339
Regnal titles
Preceded by Saw Yun	King of Sagaing; 1327–1335/36	Succeeded by Anawrahta I
