= Sagaing kingdom =

Short-lived kingdom in present-day Myanmar (1315–1365)

Sagaing kingdom စစ်ကိုင်းပြည်
- 1315–1365
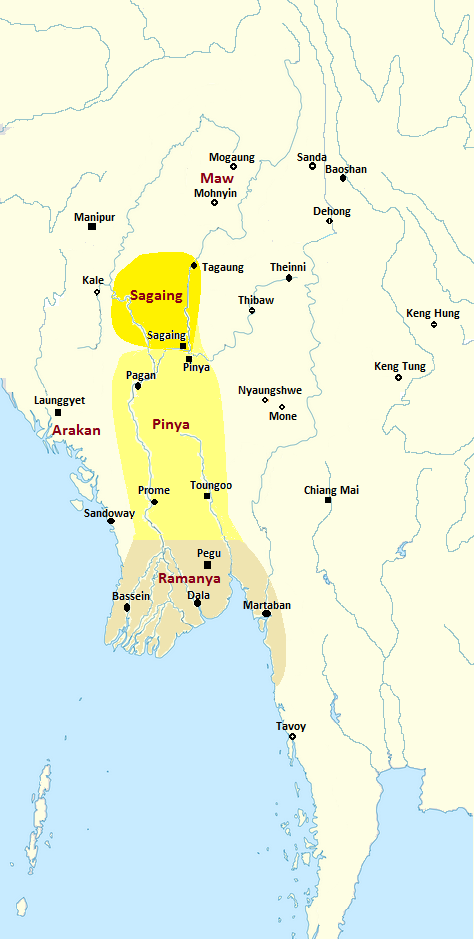
- Sagaing kingdom c. 1350
- Status: Kingdom
- Capital: Sagaing
- Common languages: Burmese (official); Shan
- Religion: Theravada Buddhism, Ari Buddhism, animism
- Government: Monarchy
  - 1315–1327: Saw Yun
  - 1327–1336: Tarabya I
  - 1339–1349: Kyaswa
  - 1352–1364: Thihapate
- Legislature: None (Rule by decree)
- Historical era: Warring states
  - Pinya kingdom founded: 7 February 1313
  - Sagaing autonomy proclaimed: 15 May 1315
  - Secession from Pinya: 1315–1317 (de facto); 1325 (de jure)
  - Court rule: 1336–1350s
  - Maw raids: 1356–1364
  - Maw Sack of Sagaing: April 1364
  - Ava kingdom founded: 26 February 1365
Preceded by	Succeeded by
Pinya kingdom	Ava kingdom
- Today part of: Myanmar

The Sagaing kingdom (Burmese: စစ်ကိုင်းပြည်, [zəɡáɪɰ̃ nèpjìdɔ̀]), classical pali name Jeyyapura (ဇေယျပုရ, "Victorious City"), was a small kingdom ruled by a junior branch of the Myinsaing dynasty from 1315 to 1365. Originally the northern province of Sagaing of the Pinya kingdom, it became de facto independent after Prince Saw Yun successfully fought for autonomy from his father King Thihathu in 1315–17. Sagaing formally seceded from Pinya in 1325 after Thihathu's death.

The northern petty state stayed independent for the next four decades mainly due to Pinya's internal divisions. Sagaing itself was full of palace intrigues, and the court led by Nanda Pakyan came to control a string of weak monarchs from the mid-1330s to the 1350s. In the 1350s, Princess Soe Min successfully repaired Sagaing's long-strained relationship with Pinya in order to defend against the northern Shan state of Maw. Sagaing bore the brunt of repeated Maw invasions of Upper Myanmar (Burma) (1356–64). Maw forces broke through in 1364, sacking both capitals of Sagaing and Pinya in succession. In the wake of the latest Maw raid, Saw Yun's grandson Prince Thado Minbya seized both devastated capitals in 1364, and founded the Ava kingdom in 1365.

Sagaing, like its bigger cousin Pinya, was a microcosm of the fractious small kingdoms period (1287–1555). The small kingdom is remembered in Burmese history as the polity that gave birth to Ava, the dominant power of Upper Myanmar from the 14th to 16th centuries.

== History ==
=== Origins ===
==== Myinsaing regency ====
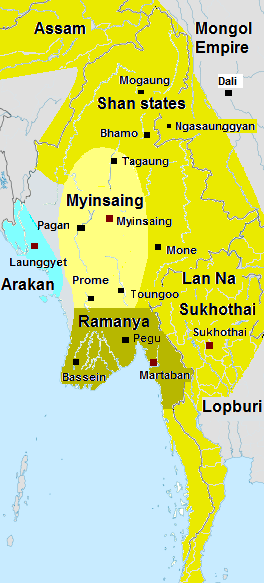
Myinsaing c. 1310

At the end of the 13th century, Sagaing was the northernmost vassal state of Myinsaing, the polity that succeeded Pagan in Central Burma. The northern province included the Mu valley, one of the three main granaries of the Irrawaddy valley. To the north of Sagaing lay the Province of Zhengmian of the Mongol Empire—present-day northern Burma and southwestern Yunnan, which the Mongols had wrested away from the Pagan Empire since the 1280s. The Mongols launched another invasion in 1300–01 but could not break through and quit northern Burma altogether in 1303.

Myinsaing's rulers—Athinkhaya, Yazathingyan and Thihathu—raced to regain northern Burma but got no further than Tagaung. Various Shan states, nominal Mongol vassals, now dominated the entire northwestern-to-southeastern arc surrounding the Irrawaddy valley. In 1313, Thihathu, the last surviving brother, founded Pinya as the de jure successor state of Pagan. He kept his newly built capital Pinya in the Kyaukse granary instead of the historical capital Pagan (Bagan) probably because Pinya was closer to the Mu valley.

==== Pinya ====
For the first time since the 1280s, the entire Irrawaddy between Prome (Pyay) in the south and Tagaung in the north was under a single ruler. But the trouble was brewing from the start. First, the Myinsaing-Pinya rulers had inherited the longstanding problem that had existed since the late Pagan period: between one and two-thirds of Upper Burma's cultivated land had been donated to religion, and the crown had lost resources needed to retain the loyalty of courtiers and military servicemen. Furthermore, "markedly drier weather during the late 13th and much of the 14th centuries" in Upper Burma forced large migrations from the established granaries (Kyaukse, Minbu, and Mu valley) "to better watered districts farther south".

To compound the problem, Pinya was hit with a dynastic feud from the start. So eager was Thihathu, a commoner, to be seen as a legitimate king of Pagan, he made his adopted stepson Uzana, biological son of King Kyawswa of Pagan and Queen Mi Saw U, his heir-apparent. He also appointed Kyawswa I, his biological son by Mi Saw U, governor of Pinle, the second most coveted position. On the other hand, the king did not appoint Saw Yun, his eldest biological son by a commoner queen, Yadanabon, or Tarabya his stepson by Yadanabon, to any meaningful positions. He appointed Saw Yun governor of Sagaing in 1314 only after the eldest son's repeated protestations. Saw Yun remained deeply unhappy for he still did not command an army as did Uzana and Kyawswa.

=== Secession from Pinya ===
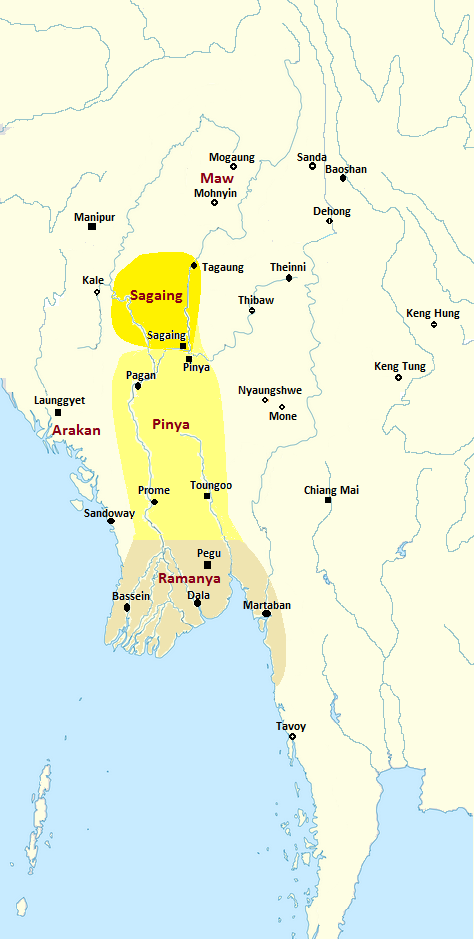
Pinya c. 1350

The simmering resentment led to Saw Yun's insurrection. In 1315, the teenage prince walked out of the Pinya Palace, never to return. (Note: Earlier chronicles, Zatadawbon Yazawin (Zata 1960: 71) and Maha Yazawin (Maha Yazawin Vol. 1 2006: 262) say that Saw Yun revolted in 684 ME (29 March 1322 to 28 March 1323). Maha Yazawin continues to say that Saw Yun completed the brick wall a year later in 685 ME (29 March 1323 to 28 March 1324). Later chronicles Yazawin Thit (Yazawin Thit Vol. 1 2012: 161) and Hmannan Yazawin (Hmannan Vol. 1 2003: 375) say that he left Pinya on 12th waxing of 3rd month of 677 ME (15 May 1315) and revolted. A contemporary inscription (Yazawin Thit Vol. 1 2012: 161, fn-3) says he founded Sagaing on 4th waxing of Late Tagu 677 ME (26 March 1316).) He found support among a sect of forest-dwelling monks and their followers who had become politically powerful during the chaotic conditions of the upcountry. The young prince went on to upgrade Sagaing's timber walls to brick without his father's permission, and completed it in 1316. Thihathu seemed conflicted about punishing his teenage son. The king, who had never liked to share power—even with his own brothers—never sent a full force to reclaim Sagaing. He did order two small expeditions, the first led by Crown Prince Uzana and the second led by Prince Kyawswa. But by the end of 1316–17 dry season, both expeditions had failed to dislodge Saw Yun.

Sagaing got a breather in 1317 when Toungoo and Taungdwin revolted. Thihathu bought peace with Taungdwin but Toungoo required an expedition. In the end, Pinya agreed to a deal that allowed the rebel leader Thawun Nge to remain in office in exchange for his nominal submission to Pinya. The deal with Toungoo proved to be the model for Sagaing as well. The king allowed Saw Yun to remain in office at Sagaing in exchange for his son's nominal submission. He was resigned to the fact that his kingdom would break apart once he died.

The kingdom formally split into two right after Thihathu's death in 1325. Saw Yun (r. 1315–27) now controlled the northern country to Tagaung while Uzana I (r. 1325–40) became king of the southern country to Prome and Toungoo. Since the end of the last war, Saw Yun had been preparing for another war against Pinya, which was much larger and more populous than Sagaing by founding special military battalions, most notably the Sagaing Cavalry. King Uzana I's authority was openly contested by Crown Prince Kyawswa I with the half-brothers maintaining their own military units. The best Pinya could muster was Kyawswa's ordering of an attempt on Saw Yun's life.

=== Middle years ===
Pinya's entrenched power struggle gave Sagaing just enough room to survive. After Saw Yun's sudden death in 1327, his half-brother Tarabya I (r. 1327–36) succeeded, perhaps as a regent. Though he was a commoner stepson of Thihathu, Tarabya ruled for the next nine years until his son Shwetaungtet (r. 1336−39) overthrew him. But the self-proclaimed king, styled as Anawrahta, could not eliminate Saw Yun's young children. The dowager Queen Saw Hnaung with the help of Chief Minister Nanda Pakyan hid the children in Mindon inside Pinya territory.

Nanda Pakyan became the power behind the throne. He ran the day-to-day affairs for the inexperienced usurper while regularly taking bribes from the dowager queen to keep the royal children hidden. In 1339, the powerful chief minister actually put down a palace coup by Tarabya's loyalists who had assassinated Shwetaungtet, ordered the execution of Tarabya, and placed Saw Yun's eldest son Kyaswa (r. 1339–49) on the throne. Kyaswa duly appointed Nanda Pakyan chief minister and commander-in-chief. The minister ran the country. He also placed the next two kings Anawrahta II (r. 1349), Tarabya II (r. 1349−52), and possibly Thihapate (r. 1352−64) on the throne.

Throughout the years, Sagaing had largely stayed out of the affairs of its larger neighbor to the south. One exception was Shwetaungtet's 1339 expedition to Mindon that brought back the children of Saw Yun to Sagaing. Pinya never responded to the transgression possibly because Shwetaungtet died right after the expedition, and because it was conducted near the climax of Pinya's internal power struggles. At any rate, the two kingdoms made peace through a marriage of state between the new king Kyaswa and Uzana I's daughter Saw Pa Oh. But the situation turned cold again in 1340 when Uzana I lost his long power struggle with Kyawswa I, and abdicated the throne. Sagaing readily gave sanctuary to Pinya's prominent defectors—Gov. Nawrahta of Pinle in 1349 and Gov. Saw Ke of Yamethin in 1351. But Tarabya II tried to cool the situation by sending his sister Princess Soe Min and her husband Gov. Thado Hsinhtein of Tagaung to seek a truce with Kyawswa II. The embassy was successful, and the peace between the two Burmese-speaking kingdoms was maintained.

=== War with Maw ===
One main reason for the truce may have been the northern Shan state of Maw (Mong Mao). The large Shan state led by Tho Chi-Bwa (Si Kefa; r. 1335–69) had been in revolt of its Mongol overlords since the early 1340s, and had successfully fought off three Mongol campaigns (1342–48). Maw troops also breached northern Sagaing territory in 1342 but they were driven back. By 1355, the Maw Shans had effectively achieved independence, and gazed southward to the Irrawaddy valley. In 1356−57, Maw troops again raided northern Sagaing territory. While Sagaing defenses held this time, both Sagaing and Pinya leadership recognized the eminent danger. The agreed to an alliance through a marriage of state between Princess Shin Saw Gyi of Sagaing and King Kyawswa II of Pinya (r. 1350–59).

The alliance yielded no discernible benefit. Kyawswa II simply did not command enough manpower to assist Sagaing and hold his southern vassals at the same time. When the next Maw raid came in 1358−59, Pinya's southern vassal Toungoo (Taungoo) promptly revolted, and attacked Pinya from the south. This allowed the Shan forces to overrun Sagaing and Pinya territories from the north. Kyawswa II died during the raids in 1359. So devastating were the raids that Pinya's new king Narathu (r. 1359–64) withdrew from the alliance.

Sagaing was now on its own. The next raid in 1362–63 overran the entire Sagaing countryside, and reached as far south as Pinya. Subsequently, Pinya pursued an alliance with Maw, and the two states agreed to a joint attack on Sagaing. In 1363–64, Maw forces again invaded, laying siege to Sagaing in early 1364, with Pinya forces enacting a naval blockade. In April 1364, Maw forces broke through, and entered the city. Thihapate escaped through the porous blockade but subsequently put to death by his stepson Thado Minbya (r. 1364–67) who seized the throne.

=== Reunification with Pinya ===
Thado Minbya, great grandson of Thihathu, went on to reunite the two kingdoms that had been split since 1315. He benefited from Maw troops having sacked Pinya and leaving Central Burma in chaos in their wake. (Deeply dissatisfied with the porous blockade of Sagaing and what he deemed insufficient contribution by Pinya to the siege, the Maw leader ordered an attack on Pinya itself, and took away Narathu and the loot.) The new king of Pinya, Uzana II (r. 1364), never gained control of the situation. In September 1364, Thado Minbya seized Pinya, and claimed himself king of Sagaing and Pinya. He built a new citadel at Ava (Inwa) at a more strategic location the confluence of the Irrawaddy and the Myitnge. It was directly across the Irrawaddy from Sagaing, roughly between Sagaing and Pinya and located in the all-important Kyaukse granary. It was the very site that his great grandfather Thihathu initially had wanted to build a new capital before choosing to build at Pinya in 1313.

=== Aftermath ===
In 1365, Thado Minbya founded the kingdom of Ava and declared Sagaing and Pinya constituent countries of Ava. Despite his proclamation, he still had no control over Pinya's southern vassals. He would spend the next three years on campaigns to gain control of former vassal states of Pinya. After Thado Minbya's sudden death from smallpox in 1367, his chief queen Saw Omma and Commander Nga Nu tried to seize the Ava throne, and when they failed, they fled to Sagaing to revive the old Sagaing kingdom. Saw Omma's brother and Thado Minbya's brother-in-law Swa Saw Ke (r. 1367–1400) put down the rebellion. Swa went on to restore the former Myinsaing kingdom, and would ultimately attempt to restore the Pagan Empire in the following decades.

== Government and society ==
=== Administration ===
Sagaing kings employed Pagan's administrative model of solar polities in which the high king ruled the core while semi-independent tributaries, autonomous viceroys, and governors actually controlled day-to-day administration and manpower. To be sure, Sagaing used the system in a far smaller scale than Pagan as its effective territory was small. (Although Sagaing claimed all the way to the border of Manipur, its effective control may have been no more than half today's Sagaing Region, without the Shan state of Kalay in the upper Chindwin region or anything beyond Tagaung, 225 km from Sagaing, the northernmost fort mentioned in the chronicles. (Note: See (Lieberman 2003: 26) for the political map c. 1340.)) Unlike with its larger neighbor to the south, Sagaing, according to the chronicles, did not have any governor-level rulers in districts (except for Tagaung). The kings may have dealt with local headmen of the districts directly.

=== Economy ===
The landlocked Sagaing was an agrarian state. It possessed the largest granary, Mu valley, of the Irrawaddy valley that covered 93,000 hectares of irrigated lands at its peak in the late Pagan period. (Note: (Aung-Thwin and Aung-Thwin 2012: 95): In the late Pagan period, the Mu valley had three major canals, totaling about 145 km, 86 auxiliary canals, 46 weirs, 31 reservoirs, and 73 sluices, altogether numbering about 232 irrigation works.) However, the agriculture during the Sagaing period never reached its potential. Cultivators had been migrating to the south since the late 13th century as much of the land had been donated to religion by the crown. By the 14th century, the monks who had been endowed the land had to till the land themselves because of the scarcity of lay cultivators.

=== Religion ===
While Theravada Buddhism was the official religion of the royal family, other sects flourished. One particular powerful sect was that of the forest-dwelling monks. The sect was influenced by Ari Buddhism and was founded in Sagaing district in 1169/70. By the early 14th century, many of the monks tilled the land on their own, and had become a political force that reported lent support to Saw Yun's insurrection in 1315. The sect remained a powerful force in the Ava period, and their power declined only in the 16th century.

=== Military ===
Sagaing did not possess a large military. It did maintain special military units, founded by Saw Yun. One cavalry regiment he founded in 1318, named Sagaing Htaungthin ("Thousand-strong Regiment of Sagaing") would be maintained until the fall of Burmese monarchy. During Saw Yun's reign, Sagaing's military included the forest dwelling monks.

== Historiography ==
The royal chronicles treat Sagaing as a junior branch of the Myinsaing dynasty.

Item	Zatadawbon Yazawin	Maha Yazawin	Yazawin Thit	Hmannan Yazawin	Inscriptions
Name of dynasty	Sagaing dynasty	no specific name	Sagaing dynasty	Sagaing dynasty	
Secession from Pinya (de facto)	1322/23	1322/23	15 May 1315	15 May 1315	26 March 1316
(de jure)	1322/23	1323/24	before 30 April 1322	before 30 April 1322	before 29 March 1325 (Note: Derived from Uzana I's succession. Per (Than Tun 1959: 123, 127), Uzana I came to power in late 686 ME. 687 ME began on 29 March 1325.)
Fall of Sagaing to Maw Shans	1364	April 1364	1364	April 1364	
Fall of Pinya to Sagaing	not mentioned	September 1364	1364	September 1364	
End of dynasty	26 February 1365	26 February 1365	26 February 1365	26 February 1365	before 8 July 1365 (Note: (Taw, Forchhammer 1899: 8; Yazawin Thit Vol. 1 2012: 182, footnote 2): Per the inscription dedicated at the Shwezigon Pagoda by King Thado Minbya himself on 8 July 1365 (Tuesday, 5th waxing of Waso 727 ME), he was already of king of Ava.)

== See also ==
- List of kings of Sagaing
- Kings family tree

== Bibliography ==
- Aung-Thwin, Michael (1985). Pagan: The Origins of Modern Burma. Honolulu: University of Hawai'i Press. ISBN 0-8248-0960-2.
- Aung-Thwin, Michael A.; Maitrii Aung-Thwin (2012). A History of Myanmar Since Ancient Times (illustrated ed.). Honolulu: University of Hawai'i Press. ISBN 978-1-86189-901-9.
- Harvey, G. E. (1925). History of Burma: From the Earliest Times to 10 March 1824. London: Frank Cass & Co. Ltd.
- Htin Aung, Maung (1967). A History of Burma. New York and London: Cambridge University Press.
- Kala, U (2006) [1724]. Maha Yazawin (in Burmese). Vol. 1–3 (4th printing ed.). Yangon: Ya-Pyei Publishing.
- Lieberman, Victor B. (2003). Strange Parallels: Southeast Asia in Global Context, c. 800–1830, volume 1, Integration on the Mainland. Cambridge University Press. ISBN 978-0-521-80496-7.
- Maha Sithu (2012) [1798]. Myint Swe; Kyaw Win; Thein Hlaing (eds.). Yazawin Thit (in Burmese). Vol. 1–3 (2nd printing ed.). Yangon: Ya-Pyei Publishing.
- Phayre, Lt. Gen. Sir Arthur P. (1967) [1883]. History of Burma. London: Susil Gupta.
- Royal Historians of Burma (1960) [c. 1680]. U Hla Tin (Hla Thamein) (ed.). Zatadawbon Yazawin. Historical Research Directorate of the Union of Burma.
- Royal Historical Commission of Burma (2003) [1832]. Hmannan Yazawin (in Burmese). Vol. 1–3. Yangon: Ministry of Information, Myanmar.
- Sein Lwin Lay, Kahtika U (2006) [1968]. Mintaya Shwe Hti and Bayinnaung: Ketumadi Taungoo Yazawin (in Burmese) (2nd printing ed.). Yangon: Yan Aung Sarpay.
- Taw, Sein Ko; Emanuel Forchhammer (1899). Inscriptions of Pagan, Pinya and Ava: Translation, with Notes. Archaeological Survey of India.
- Than Tun (December 1959). "History of Burma: A.D. 1300–1400". Journal of Burma Research Society. XLII (II).
- Than Tun (1964). Studies in Burmese History (in Burmese). Vol. 1. Yangon: Maha Dagon.
