= Saw Yun =

Athinkhaya Saw Yun; အသင်္ခယာ စောယွမ်း
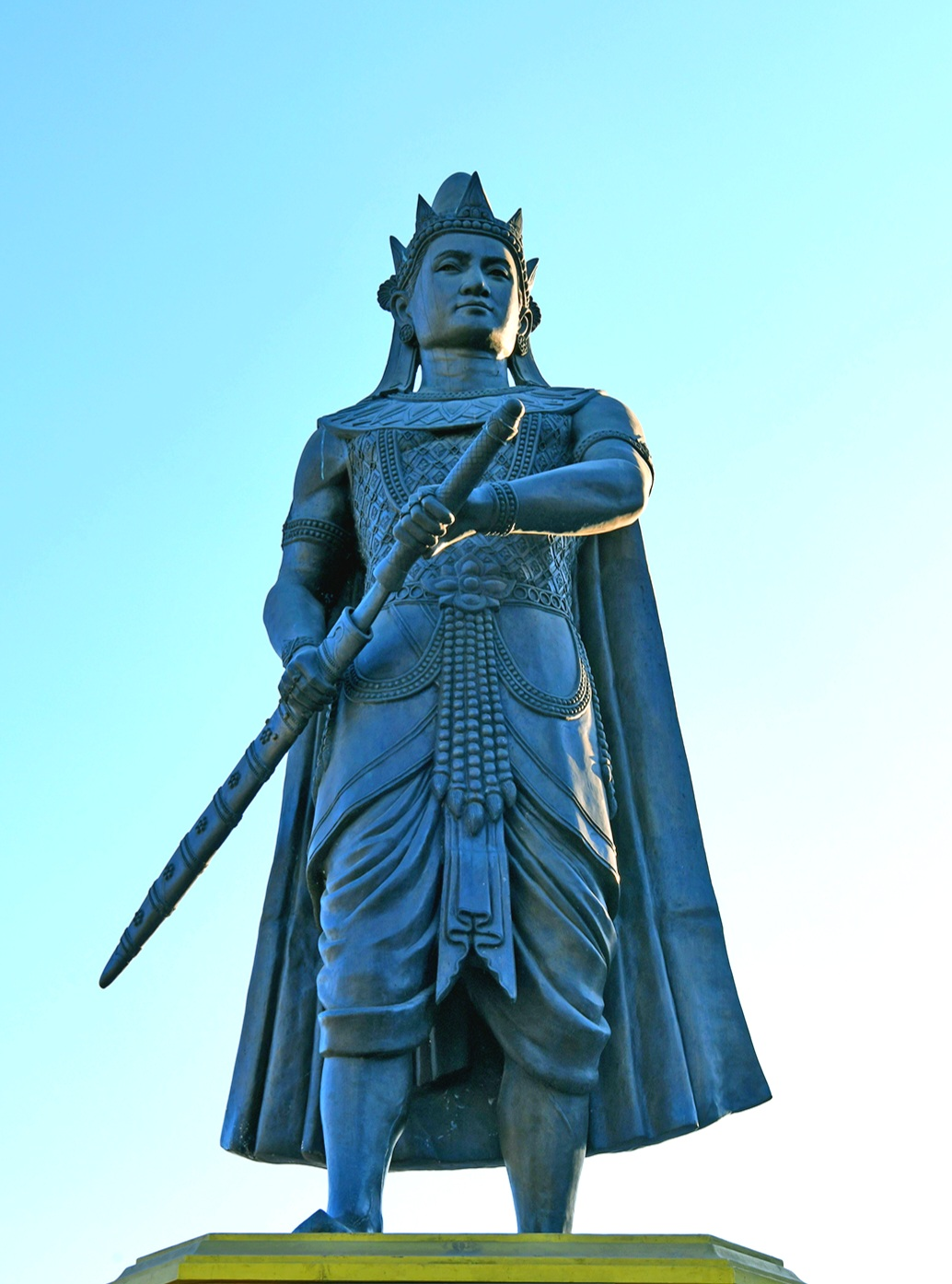
- The statue of Saw Yun at the entrance of Sagaing city

King of Sagaing
- Reign: 15 May 1315 – 5 February 1327
- Predecessor: Thihathu
- Successor: Tarabya I
- Born: c. 1299; Monday, 661 ME; Pinle, Myinsaing Kingdom
- Died: 5 February 1327 (aged 27); Thursday, Full moon of Tabaung 688 ME; Sagaing, Sagaing Kingdom
- Consort: Saw Hnaung
- Issue: Soe Min; Kyaswa; Nawrahta Minye; Tarabya II
- House: Myinsaing
- Father: Thihathu
- Mother: Yadanabon
- Religion: Theravada Buddhism

Athinkhaya Saw Yun (Burmese: အသင်္ခယာ စောယွမ်း [ʔəθɪ̀ɰ̃ kʰəjà sɔ́ jʊ́ɰ̃]; also spelled Saw-Yoom; c. 1299 – 5 February 1327) was the founder of the Sagaing Kingdom of Myanmar (Burma). The eldest son of King Thihathu set up a rival kingdom in 1315 after Thihathu appointed Uzana I as heir-apparent. Saw Yun successfully resisted two small expeditions by Pinya by 1317. While Saw Yun nominally remained loyal to his father, he was the de facto king of the area roughly corresponding to present-day Sagaing Region and northern Mandalay Region.

After Thihathu's death, Sagaing and Pinya formally went separate ways. Saw Yun died in 1327. Saw Yun had four children, three sons and a daughter. All of his sons became king of Sagaing. His only daughter was the mother of Thado Minbya, the founder of the Kingdom of Ava.

== Early life ==
Saw Yun was born to Thihathu, co-founder of Myinsaing Kingdom, and Yadanabon, daughter of the village head of Linyin, c. 1299. According to British colonial scholars, Saw Yun's mother was an ethnic Shan and his father half-Shan. But the royal chronicles do not mention his ethnicity at all. He grew up in Pinle, his father's capital alongside an elder step-brother Uzana, half younger brother Kyawswa, and a younger half-sister Saw Pale. The family moved to Pinya in 1313 when Thihathu became the sole ruler of the Kingdom of Myinsaing–Pinya.

== Secession ==
Thihathu now officially considered himself the heir to Pagan kings. His chief queen was Mi Saw U, a daughter of Narathihapate. More importantly, he appointed his adopted son Uzana, the biological son of the fallen king Kyawswa and Mi Saw U, as his heir apparent. He also appointed Kyawswa, his first son by Mi Saw U, governor of Pinle.

The appointments did not go down well with Saw Yun, his eldest biological son by a commoner queen (Yadanabon). Saw Yun felt the throne was his. He agitated his father for a viceroyship in the north. While Thihathu wavered, on 15 May 1315, Saw Yun took matters into his own hands, and left for Sagaing with a group of followers, a few miles west of Pinya, across the Irrawaddy. Saw Yun found support in a sect of forest dwelling monks and their followers.

At first, Thihathu dismissed the 15-year-old's thinly veiled insurrection, and did not take any action. But Saw Yun continued to consolidate his support in the north, and fortified Sagaing with a brick wall, completed on 26 March 1316. Even then, Thihathu's response was halfhearted. He sent two small expeditions, each led by Uzana and Kyawswa respectively, to retake the city. Both attempts failed. Thihathu, who never liked rivals even with his own brothers, now decided to leave his eldest biological son alone. Saw Yun's position may also have been helped by an open rebellion in Toungoo (Taungoo) in 1317–18, and subsequent instabilities in Taungdwin. Thihathu got both Toungoo and Taungdwin under control but essentially ceded control of northern Upper Burma to Saw Yun. For his part, Saw Yun never formally renounced his allegiance to his father. Thihathu had to be satisfied with the arrangement although he must have known that Pinya and Sagaing would become bitter rivals after his death.

== Reign ==
After Thihathu's death in 1325, the two kingdoms formally went separate ways, with Pinya controlling southern Upper Burma and Sagaing northern Upper Burma. (Zatadawbon Yazawin and Maha Yazawin chronicles count Saw Yun's official reign at Sagaing only after the death of Thihathu whereas later chronicles Yazawin Thit and Hmannan Yazawin count his reign from his first insurrection in 1315.) Early on, Pinya's new rulers still had designs on Sagaing. Pinya's attempt to assassinate Saw Yun nearly succeeded, stopped only by the assassin Khin Nyo's conscience at the last minute.

Saw Yun was remembered in Burmese chronicles as powerful, kindly and popular. He also contributed to Burmese military. In 1318, Saw Yun formed a cavalry regiment called Sagaing Htaungthin (စစ်ကိုင်း ထောင်သင်း [zəɡáɪɴ tʰàʊɴ ɵɪ́ɴ]; lit. "Thousand-strong Regiment of Sagaing", although the numbers added up to only 830), which was maintained up till the fall of Burmese monarchy, and nine squadrons of cavalry.

Cavalry name	Strength
Tamakha Myin တမာခါး မြင်း	150
Pyinsi Myin ပြင်စည် မြင်း	150
Yudawmu Myin ယူတော်မူ မြင်း	150
Letywaygyi Myin လက်ရွေးကြီး မြင်း	150
Letywaynge Myin လက်ရွေးငယ် မြင်း	70
Kyaungthin Myin ကြောင်သင်း မြင်း	50
Myinthegyi Myin မြင်းသည်ကြီး မြင်း	50
Hketlon Myin ခက်လုံး မြင်း	30
Sawputoh Myin စောပွတ်အိုး မြင်း	30

He died c. 5 February 1327. He had four children by his chief queen Saw Hnaung: Soe Min, Kyaswa, Nawrahta Minye, and Tarabya II.

== Historiography ==
The chronicles and inscriptional evidence show various dates with regard to his life.

Source	Birth–Death	Age	Reign	Length of reign	Reference
Zatadawbon Yazawin	c. 1303–1330/31	27 (28th year)	1322/23–1330/31	8	
Maha Yazawin	c. 1303–1330/31	27 (28th year)	1322/23–1330/31	8	
Yazawin Thit	c. 1300 – 30 April 1322	21 (22nd year)	15 May 1315 – 30 April 1322	8 [sic]	(Note: (Yazawin Thit Vol. 1 2012: 161): 12th waxing of 3rd month of 677 ME = 15 May 1315. (Yazawin Thit Vol. 1 2012: 173): Tarabya I ascended the throne on Friday, 1st waning of Kason 684 ME (Saturday, 1 May 1322); if it was Friday, it should have been 30 April 1322.)
Hmannan Yazawin	c. 1300 – 30 April 1322	21 (22nd year)	15 May 1315 – 30 April 1322	8 [sic]	

== Bibliography ==
- Harvey, G. E. (1925). History of Burma: From the Earliest Times to 10 March 1824. London: Frank Cass & Co. Ltd.
- Htin Aung, Maung (1967). A History of Burma. New York and London: Cambridge University Press.
- Kala, U (2006) [1724]. Maha Yazawin (in Burmese). Vol. 1–3 (4th printing ed.). Yangon: Ya-Pyei Publishing.
- Maha Sithu (2012) [1798]. Kyaw Win; Thein Hlaing (eds.). Yazawin Thit (in Burmese). Vol. 1–3 (2nd ed.). Yangon: Ya-Pyei Publishing.
- Phayre, Lt. Gen. Sir Arthur P. (1883). History of Burma (1967 ed.). London: Susil Gupta.
- Royal Historical Commission of Burma (2003) [1832]. Hmannan Yazawin (in Burmese). Vol. 1–3. Yangon: Ministry of Information, Myanmar.
- Than Tun (December 1959). "History of Burma: A.D. 1300–1400". Journal of Burma Research Society. XLII (II).

Saw Yun Myinsaing Dynasty Born: c. 1299 Died: 5 February 1327
Regnal titles
Preceded by Thihathu	King of Sagaing; 15 May 1315 – 5 February 1327	Succeeded by Tarabya I
